= List of ships of Austria-Hungary =

This is a list of Austro-Hungarian Navy ships.

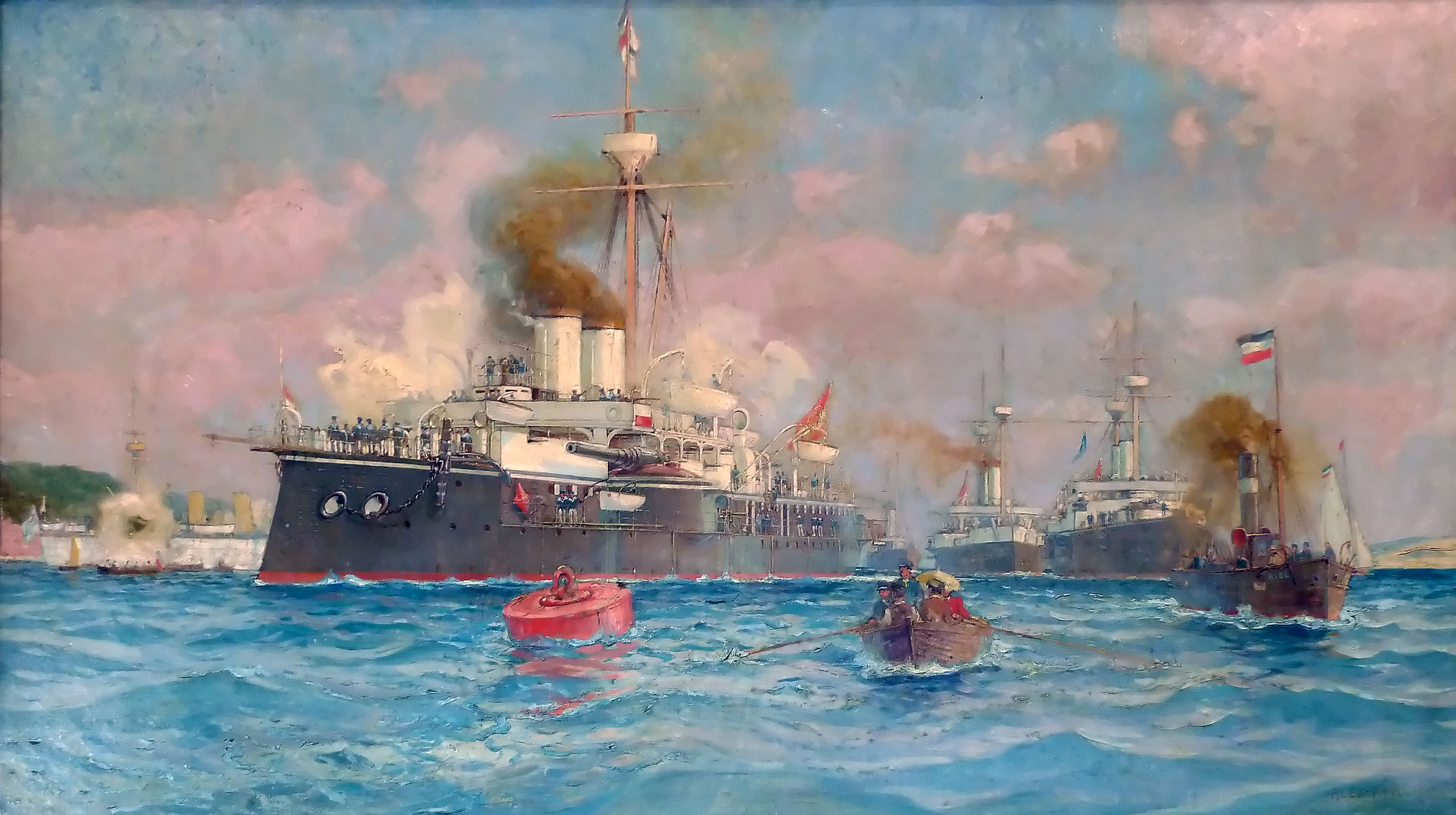
Painting of an Austro-Hungarian squadron, led by SMS Kronprinz Erzherzog Rudolf, in Kiel, Germany

== Capital ships ==
=== Ships of the line ===
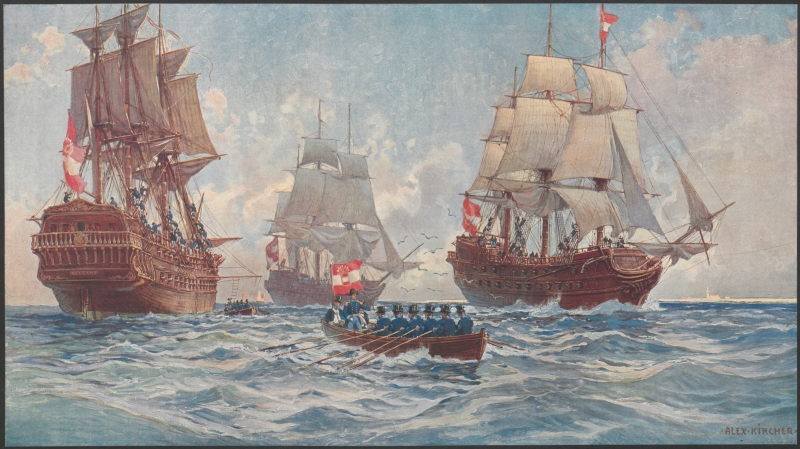
Laharpe, Stengel and Beyrand in 1799

- Santa Elisabetta - Purchased from Britain in 1720
- San Michele - Purchased from Britain in 1720
- San Carlos (80) - (ex-Cumberland) Purchased from Britain in 1720 and decommissioned in 1733
- Laharpe (74) - Captured from France, decommissioned and broken up in 1799
- Stengel (74) - Captured from France, decommissioned and broken up in 1799
- Beyrand (74) - Captured from France, decommissioned and broken up in 1799
- Bucentaure class
  - Saturno (80) - Seized from France in 1814 as war reparations, renamed Emo in 1816 and decommissioned and broken up in 1823
- Téméraire class
  - Mont Saint-Bernard (82) - Seized from France as war reparations and accidentally burnt in 1814
  - Castiglione (74) - Seized from France as war reparations and accidentally burnt in 1814
  - Regeneratore (74) - Seized from France in 1814 as war reparations, razeed into a frigate and renamed Bellona in 1823 before being decommissioned and broken up in 1831
  - Reale Italiano (74) - Seized from France in 1814 as war reparations, razeed into a frigate in 1825 before being decommissioned and broken up in 1838
  - Cesare (74) - Seized from France in 1814 as war reparations and decommissioned between 1824 and 1835
  - Montenotte (74) - Seized from France as war reparations, never completed broken up on stocks
  - Arcole (74) - Seized from France as war reparations, never completed broken up on stocks
  - Lombardo (74) - Seized from France as war reparations, never completed broken up on stocks
  - Semmering (74) - Seized from France as war reparations, never completed broken up on stocks
- SMS Kaiser (92) - Launched at Pola in 1858, commissioned in 1859 and seized by Italy in 1918

=== Ironclad ships ===
Tegetthoff in Pola in the late 1880s

- Drache class
  - SMS Drache (1861)
  - SMS Salamander (1861)
- Kaiser Max class
  - SMS Kaiser Max (1862)
  - SMS Prinz Eugen (1862)
  - SMS Don Juan d'Austria (1862)
- Erzherzog Ferdinand Max class
  - SMS Erzherzog Ferdinand Max (1865)
  - SMS Habsburg (1865)
- SMS Lissa (1869)
- SMS Kaiser (1858) – former ship of the line, re-launched 1871 as ironclad
- SMS Custoza (1872)
- SMS Erzherzog Albrecht (1872)
- Kaiser Max class
  - SMS Kaiser Max (1875)
  - SMS Don Juan d'Austria (1875)
  - SMS Prinz Eugen (1877)
- SMS Tegetthoff (1878)
- SMS Kronprinz Erzherzog Rudolf (1887)
- SMS Kronprinzessin Erzherzogin Stephanie (1887)

=== Coastal defence ships ===
- Monarch class
  - SMS Budapest (1895)
  - SMS Monarch (1895)
  - SMS Wien (1895) – sunk at anchor by an Italian torpedo motor-boat inside the defences of Trieste harbour in 1917

=== Battleships ===
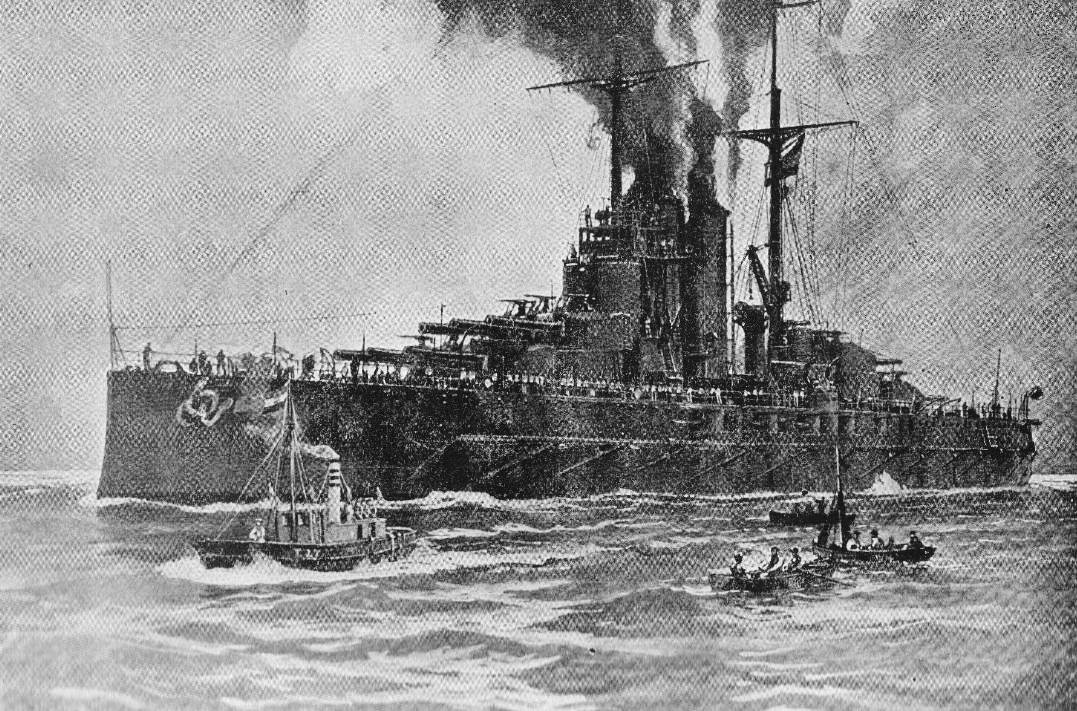
Viribus Unitis at anchor in 1914

- Habsburg class
  - SMS Habsburg (1900)
  - SMS Árpád (1901)
  - SMS Babenberg (1902)
- Erzherzog Karl class
  - SMS Erzherzog Karl (1903)
  - SMS Erzherzog Friedrich (1904)
  - SMS Erzherzog Ferdinand Max (1905)
- Radetzky class
  - SMS Erzherzog Franz Ferdinand (1908)
  - SMS Radetzky (1909)
  - SMS Zrínyi (1910)
- Tegetthoff class (all c21,700 metric tons displacement)
  - SMS Viribus Unitis (1911)
  - SMS Tegetthoff (1912)
  - SMS Prinz Eugen (1912)
  - SMS Szent István (1914)
- Ersatz Monarch class (Projected)

== Cruisers ==
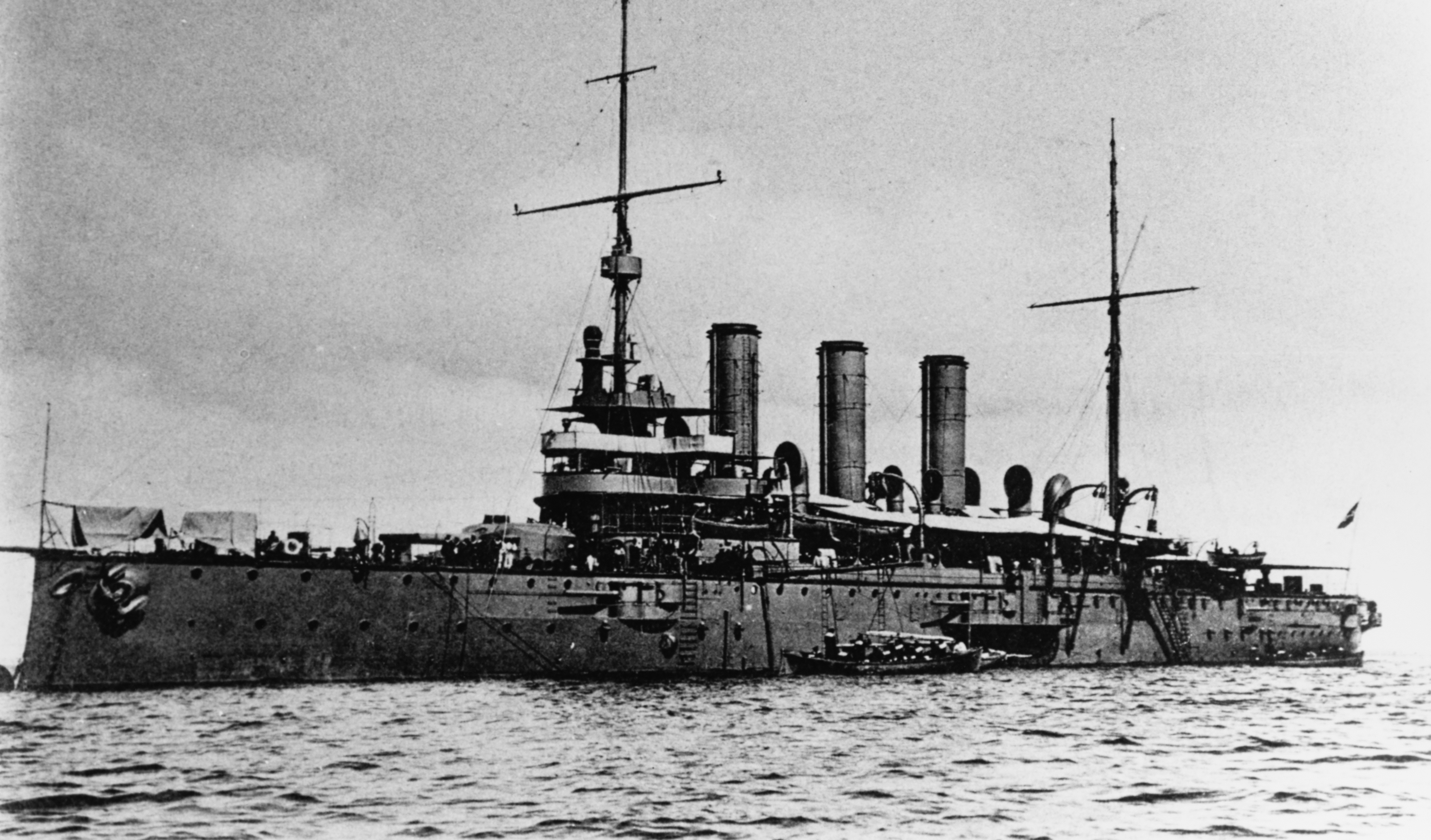
The armored cruiser Kaiser Karl VI

=== Armoured cruisers ===
- SMS Kaiserin und Königin Maria Theresia (1893)(rebuild 1909)
- SMS Kaiser Karl VI (1900)
- SMS Sankt Georg (1903)

=== Torpedo cruisers ===
- Zara class
  - SMS Zara (1879)
  - SMS Spalato (1879)
  - SMS Sebenico (1882)
- SMS Lussin (1883)
- Panther class
  - SMS Panther (1885)
  - SMS Leopard (1885)
- SMS Tiger (1887)

=== Protected cruisers ===
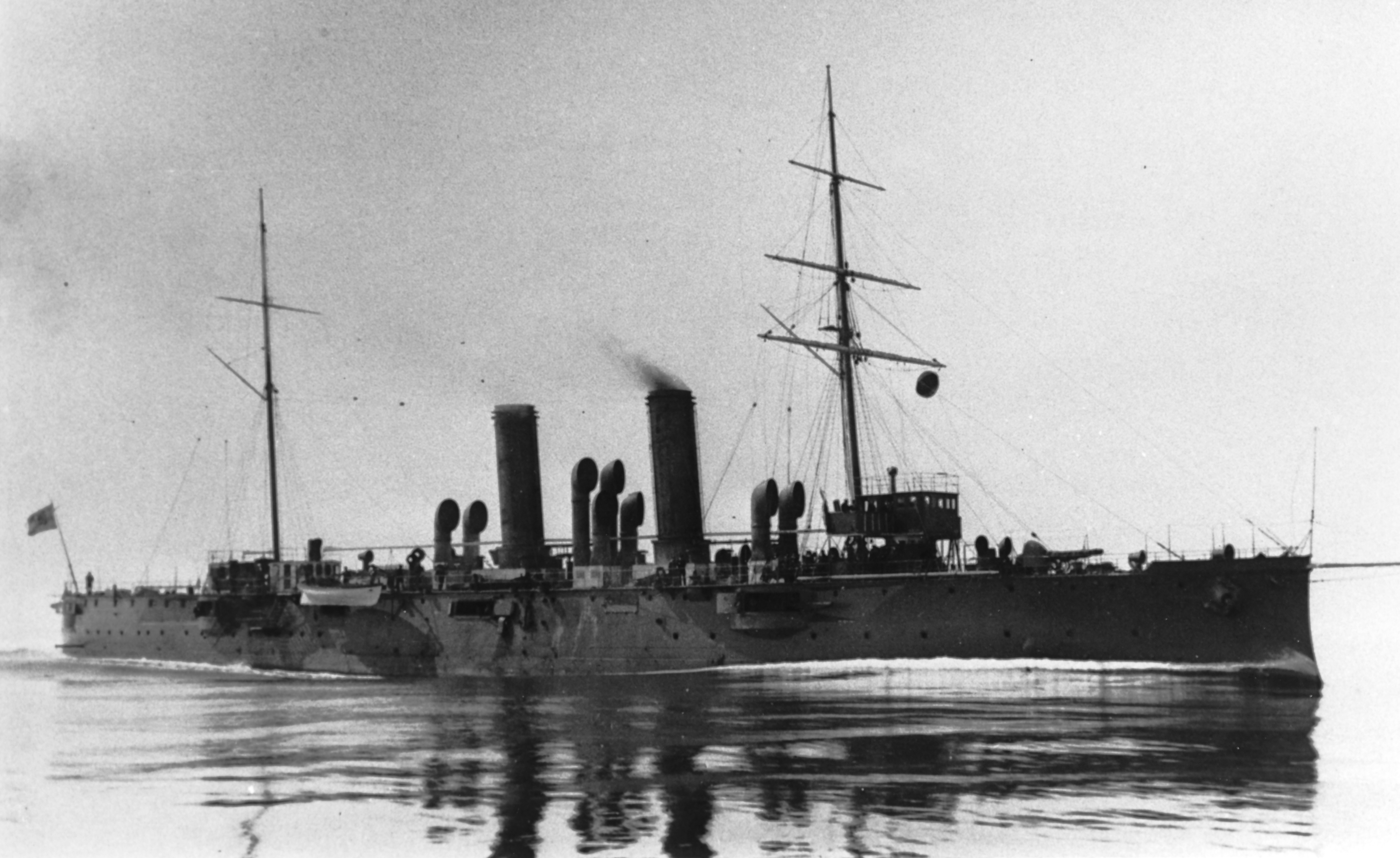
SMS Szigetvár underway

- Kaiser Franz Joseph I class
  - SMS Kaiser Franz Joseph I (1890)
  - SMS Kaiserin Elisabeth (1892)
- Zenta class
  - SMS Aspern (1899)
  - SMS Szigetvár (1899)
  - SMS Zenta (1899)

=== Scout cruisers ===
- SMS Admiral Spaun (1910)
- Novara class
  - SMS Saida (1912)
  - SMS Helgoland (1912)
  - SMS Novara (1913)

=== Light cruisers ===
- Ersatz Zenta class 3 ships planned (1917 projected)

== Sailing ships ==
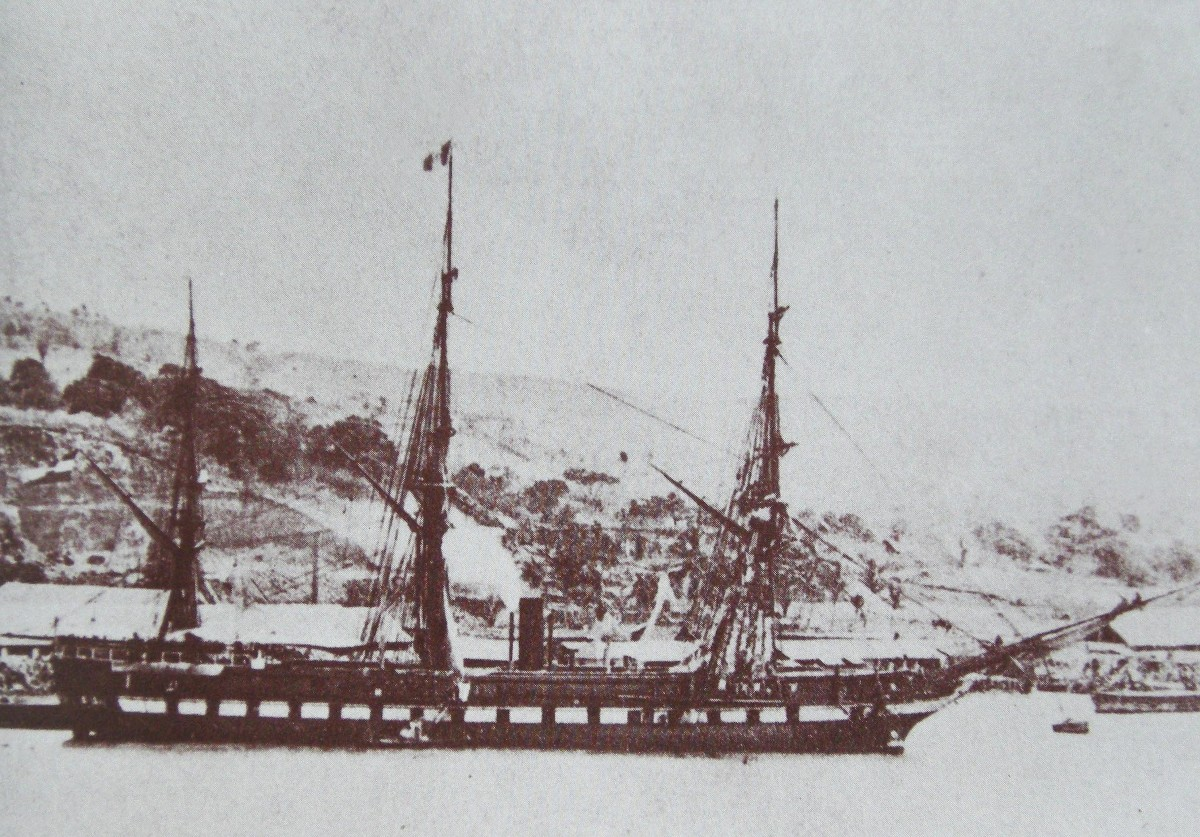
SMS Bellona in 1864

=== Sailing frigates ===
- SMS Carolina (1808) Ex-French Carolina
- Téméraire class
  - Bellona (1811) - ex-French Régénérateur
  - Reale Italiano (1812) - ex-French Royal Italien
- Pallas class
  - SMS Lipsia (1811) - ex-French Princesse de Bologne
  - SMS Austria (1812) - ex-French Piave
  - SMS Augusta (1813) - ex-French Amphitrite
  - SMS Ebe (1820) - ex-French Hébé
  - SMS Medea (1827) - ex-French Moscava
  - SMS Guerriera (1829) - ex-French Guerrière, later renamed Juno
  - SMS Venere (1832) - ex-French Vénus, later renamed Venus
- SMS Bellona (1842)
- SMS Novara (1850) – Later screw frigate (see below)
- SMS Schwarzenberg (1853) – Later screw frigate (see below)

=== Sailing corvettes ===
- SMS Adria (1826)
- SMS Lipsia (1826) - later renamed Leipzig
- SMS Veloce (1827)
- SMS Abbondanza (1831)
- SMS Cesarea (1833) - later renamed Titania
- SMS Carolina (1833)
- SMS Diana (1834) - originally named Veloce
- SMS Minerva (1838) - originally named Clemenza
- SMS Carolina (1847) (1847)

=== Sailing brigs ===
- SMS Montecuccoli (1831)
- SMS Pola (1832)
- SMS Pylades (1843)
- SMS Hussar (1847)

=== Schooners ===
- SMS Camaeleon (1833)
- SMS Fido (1834)
- SMS Bravo (1837)
- SMS Dromedar (1837)
- SMS Arethusa (1850)
- SMS Arthemisia (1851)
- SMS Saida (1855)

=== Paddle steamers ===
- SMS Vulcano (1843)
- SMS Messagiere (1847)
- SMS Achilles (1848)
- SMS Custoza (1848)
- SMS Curtatone (1848)
- SMS Roma (1848)
- SMS Santa Lucia (1850)
- SMS Volta (1850)
- SMS Kaiserin Elisabeth (1850)
- SMS Taurus (1851)
- SMS Gorzkowski (1854)
- SMS Prinz Eugen (1854)
- SMS Jupiter (1857)

=== Screw frigates ===
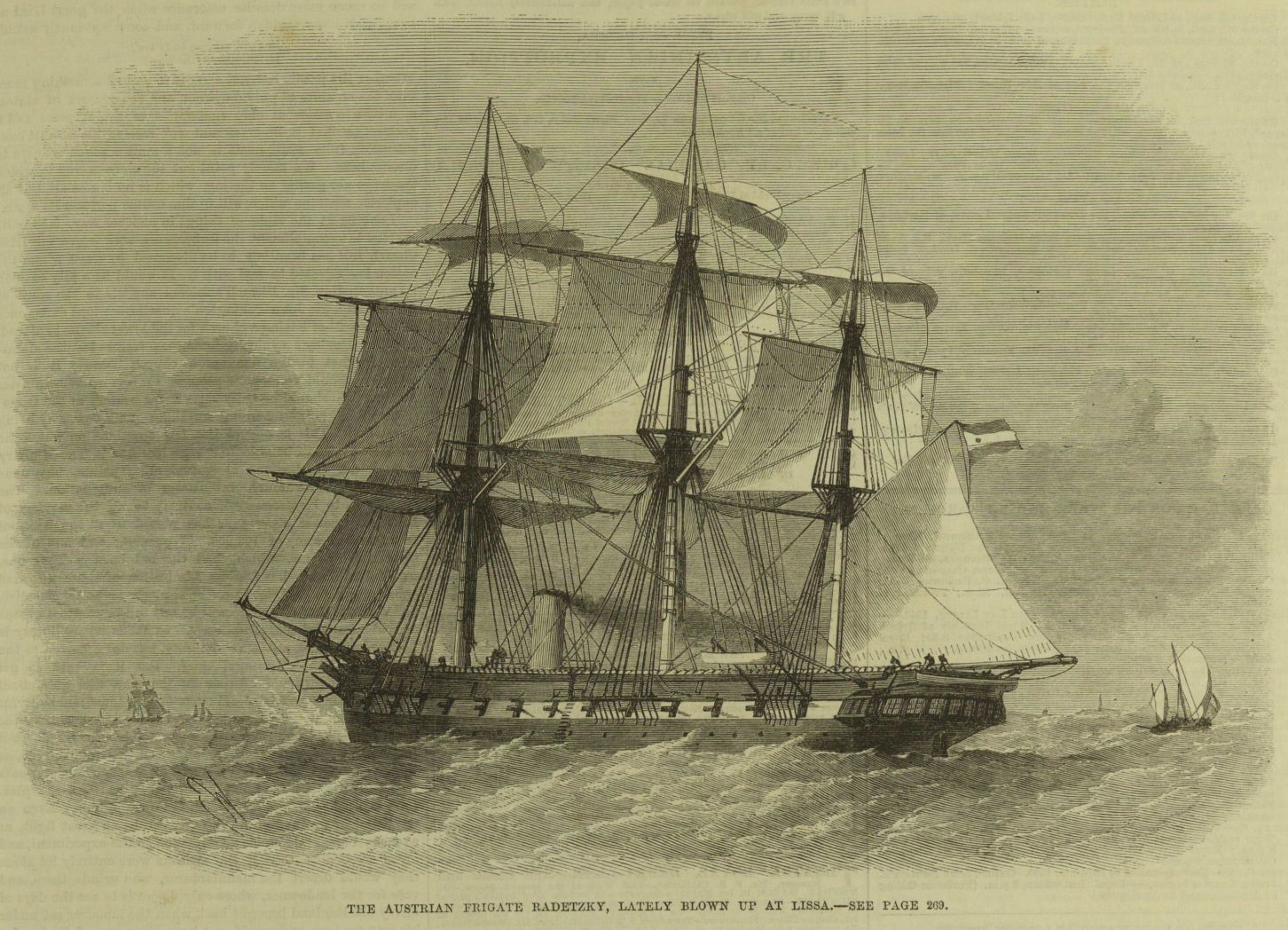
SMS Radetzky

- Radetzky class
  - SMS Radetzky (1854)
  - SMS Adria (1856)
  - SMS Donau (1856)
- SMS Novara (1850) – Ex-sailing frigate, 1862
- SMS Schwarzenberg (1853) – Ex-sailing frigate, 1862
- Radetzky class
  - SMS Radetzky (1872) – Renamed Adria 1908
  - SMS Laudon (1873) – Renamed Schwarzenberg 1900

=== Screw corvettes ===
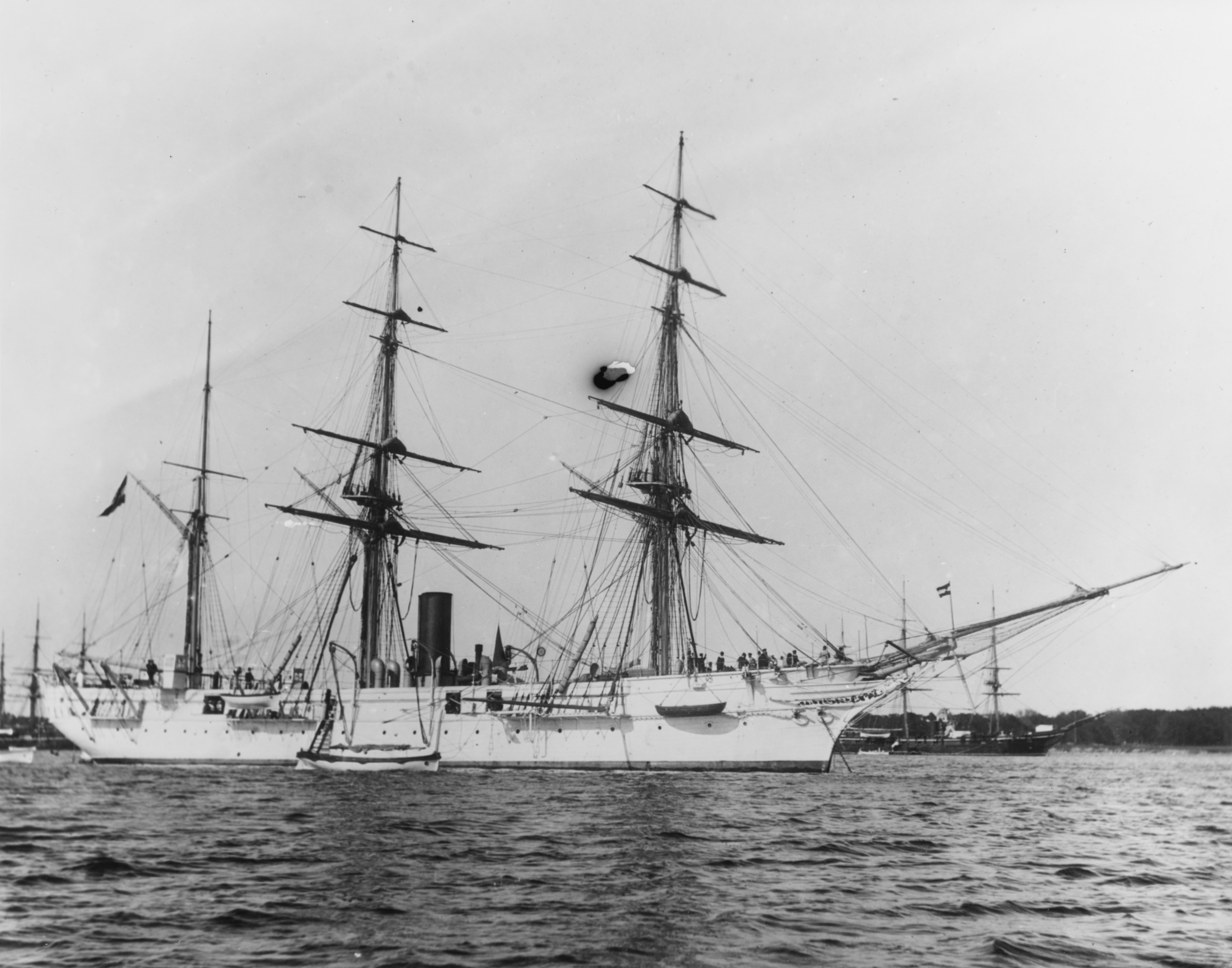
An unidentified member of the Aurora class, date unknown

- Erzherzog Friedrich class
  - SMS Erzherzog Friedrich (1857)
  - SMS Dandolo
- SMS Helgoland (1867)
- SMS Fasana (1870) – Hulked and renamed SMS Gamma 1902
- Aurora class
  - SMS Zrinyi (1870)
  - SMS Aurora (1873)
  - SMS Frundsberg (1873)
- SMS Donau (1874)
- SMS Saida (1878) – Renamed SMS Minerva 1912
- SMS Donau (1893)

== Destroyers and torpedo boats ==
=== Second Class Torpedo boats ===
- Type I-class torpedo boat – 1 ships (1875)
- Type II-class torpedo boat – 1 ships (1878)
- Type III-class torpedo boat – 2 ships (1879)
- Type V-class torpedo boat – 4 ships (1881)
- Type IX-class torpedo boat – 2 ships (1881)
- Type XI-class torpedo boat – 16 ships (1883)
- Type XXVII-class torpedo boat – 6 ships (1886)
- Type XXXIII-class torpedo boat – 1 ship (1887)
- Type XXXIV-class torpedo boat – 6 ships (1889)

=== Coastal Torpedo boats ===
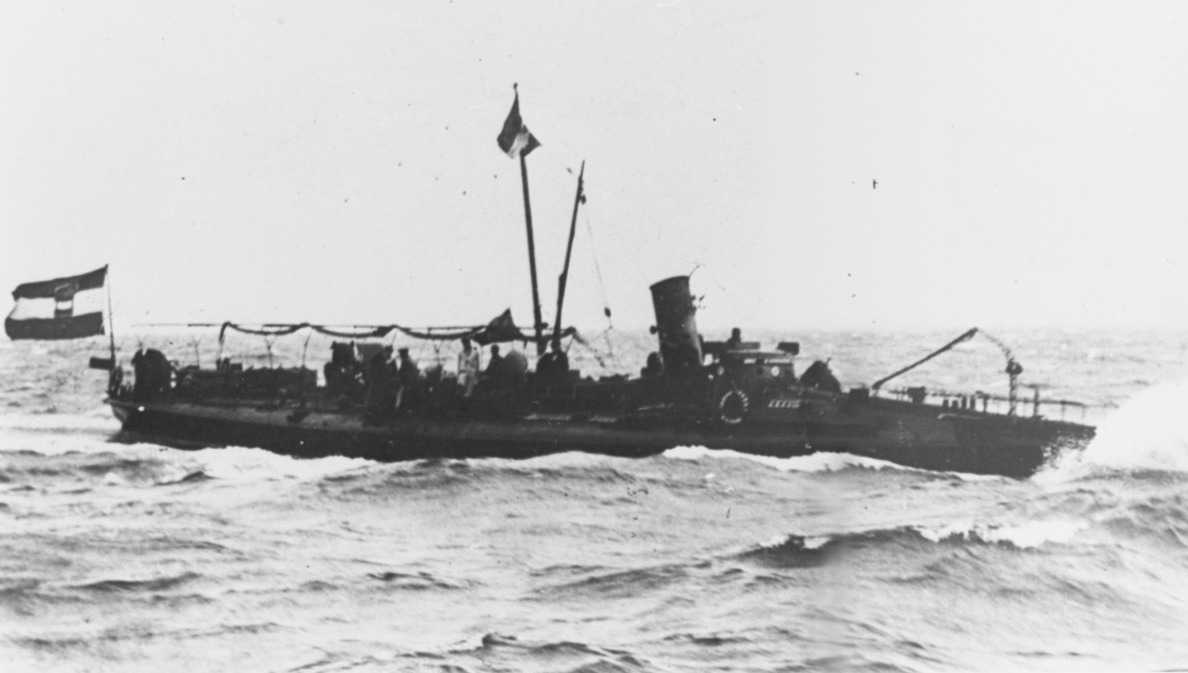
Torpedo-boat No. 38 underway

- Adler-class torpedo boat – 2 ships (1886) – 1910 Names were replaced with numbers
  - SMS Adler (1886) – No. 41
  - SMS Falke (1886) – No. 42
- Schichau-class torpedo boat – 22 ships (1885–1891) – 1910 Names were replaced with numbers
  - SMS Kiebitz – No. 19
  - SMS Kukuk – No. 20
  - SMS Staar – No. 21
  - SMS Krähe – No. 22
  - SMS Rabe – No. 23
  - SMS Elster – No. 24
  - SMS Gaukler – No. 25
  - SMS Flamingo – No. 26
  - SMS Sekretär – No. 27
  - SMS Weihe – No. 28
  - SMS Marabu – No. 29
  - SMS Harpie – No. 30
  - SMS Sperber – No. 31
  - SMS Habicht – No. 32
  - SMS Bussard – No. 33
  - SMS Condor – No. 34
  - SMS Geier – No. 35
  - SMS Uhu – No. 36
  - SMS Würger – No. 37
  - SMS Kranich – No. 38
  - SMS Reiher – No. 39
  - SMS Ibis – No. 40
- SMS Natter (1896) – No. 18
- SMS Viper (1896) – No. 17
- Cobra-class torpedo boat – 4 ships (1898–1899) – 1910 Names were replaced with numbers
  - SMS Python – No. 13
  - SMS Kígyó – No. 14
  - SMS Boa (1898) – No. 15
  - SMS Cobra – No. 16
- 110t-class torpedo boat – 12 ships (1909–1911) – 1910 Numbers were changed to Arabic numerals
  - Trieste-group - 6 ships (1909–1910)
    - TB.I
    - TB.II
    - TB.III
    - TB.IV
    - TB.V
    - TB.VI
  - Fiume-group - 6 ships (1910–1911)
    - TB.VII
    - TB.VIII
    - TB.IX
    - TB.X
    - TB.XI
    - TB.XII

=== High seas torpedo boats ===
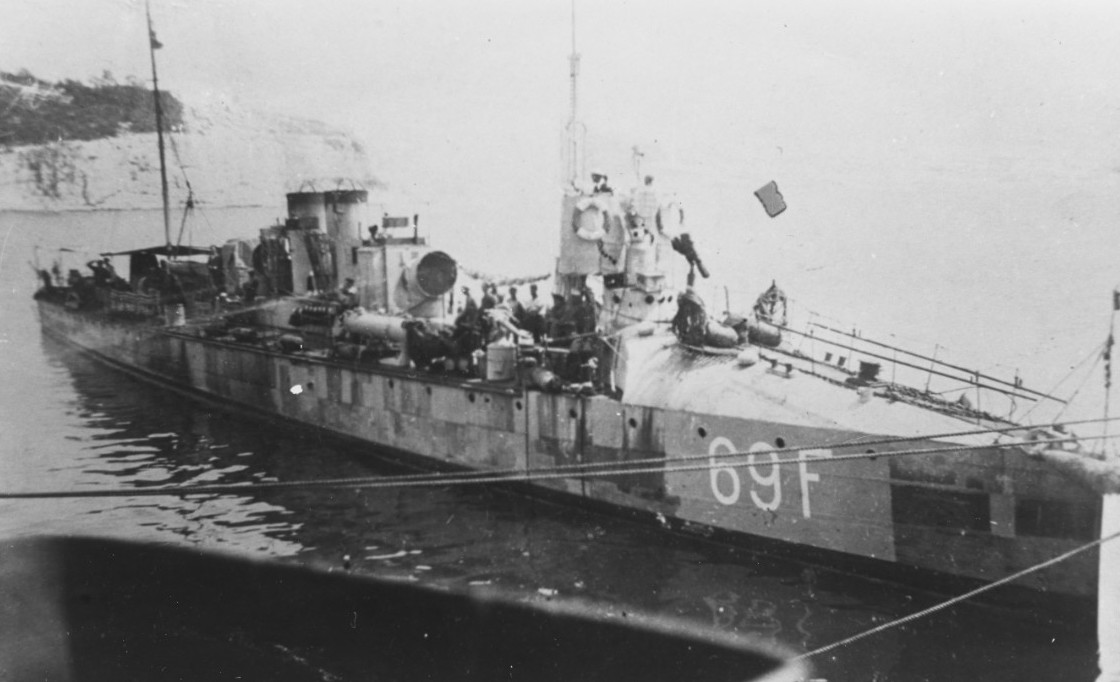
69 F (ex-Polyp, later renamed T11) photographed in 1916

- Kaiman-class torpedo boat – 24 ships (1905–1909) – 1914 Names were replaced with numbers
  - SMS Kaiman – No. 50 E
  - SMS Anaconda – No. 51 T
  - SMS Alligator – No. 52 T
  - SMS Krokodil – No. 53 T
  - SMS Wal – No. 54 T
  - SMS Seehund – No. 55 T
  - SMS Delphin – No. 56 T
  - SMS Narwal – No. 57 T
  - SMS Hai – No. 58 T
  - SMS Möwe – No. 59 T
  - SMS Schwalbe – No. 60 T
  - SMS Pinguin – No. 61 T
  - SMS Drache – No. 62 T
  - SMS Greif – No. 63 T
  - SMS Triton – No. 64 F
  - SMS Hydra – No. 65 F
  - SMS Skorpion – No. 66 F
  - SMS Phönix – No. 67 F
  - SMS Krake – No. 68 F
  - SMS Polyp – No. 69 F
  - SMS Echse – No. 70 F
  - SMS Molch – No. 71 F
  - SMS Kormoran – No. 72 F
  - SMS Alk – No. 73 F

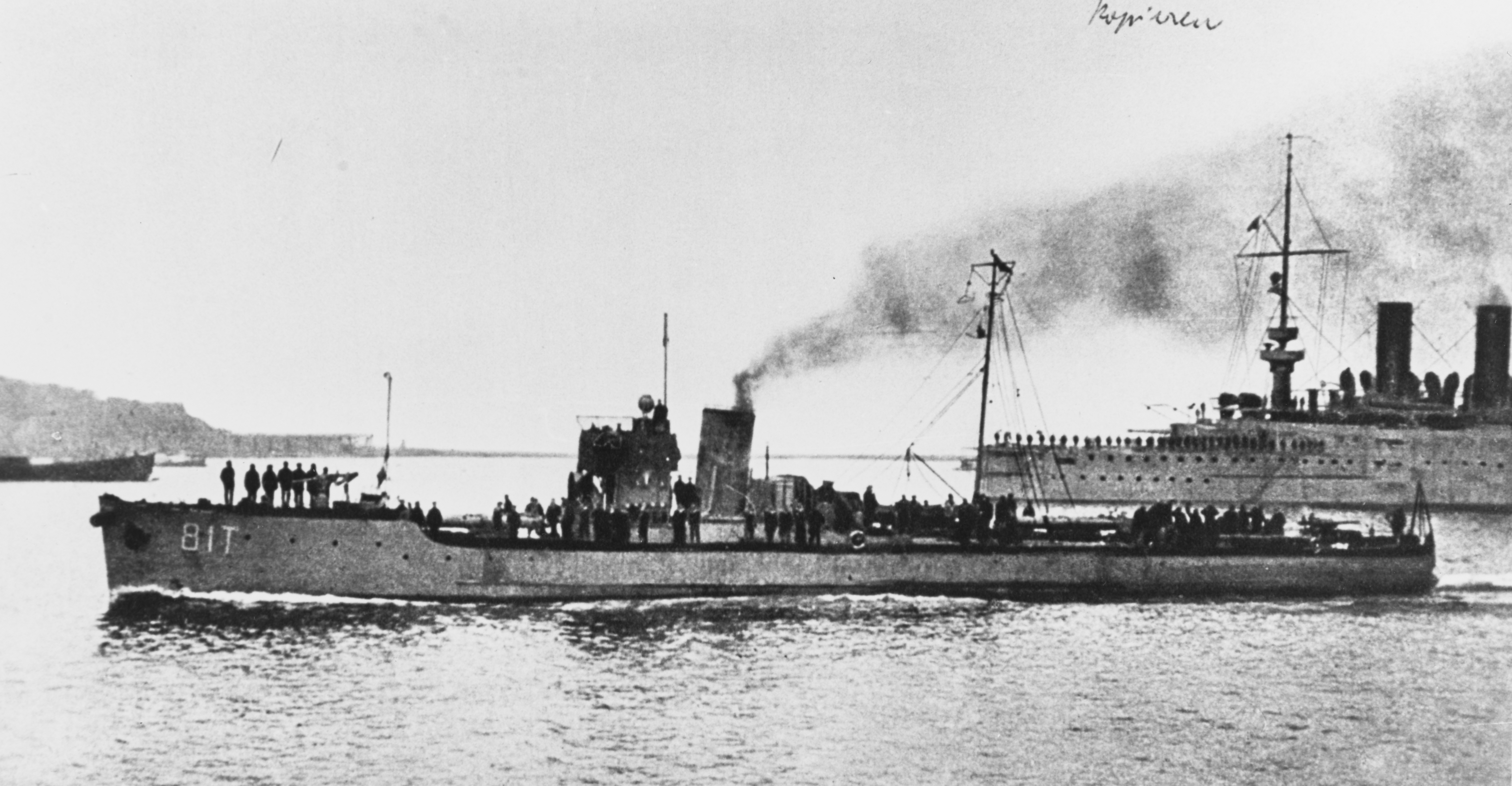
81 T

- 250t-class torpedo boat – 27 ships (1913–1916)
  - T-group - 8 ships (1913–1914)
    - 74 T
    - 75 T
    - 76 T
    - 77 T
    - 78 T
    - 79 T
    - 80 T
    - 81 T
  - F-group - 16 ships (1914–1916)
    - 82 F
    - 83 F
    - 84 T
    - 85 T
    - 86 T
    - 87 F
    - 88 T
    - 89 T
    - 90 T
    - 91 T
    - 92 F
    - 93 F
    - 94 F
    - 95 F
    - 96 F
    - 97 F
  - M-group - 3 ships (1914–1915)
    - 98 M
    - 99 M
    - 100 M

=== Torpedo gunboats ===
- SMS Meteor (1887) (1887)
- SMS Blitz (1888)
- SMS Komet (1888)
- SMS Planet (1889)
- SMS Trabant (1890)
- SMS Satellit (1892)
- SMS Magnet (1896) (named a torpedo cruiser in the shipyard)

=== Destroyers ===
- Huszár-class destroyer – 13 ships (1905–1910)
  - SMS Csikós
  - SMS Dinara
  - SMS Huszár (1905)
  - SMS Huszár (1910)
  - SMS Pandur
  - SMS Reka
  - SMS Scharfschütze (Sniper)
  - SMS Streiter
  - SMS Turul
  - SMS Ulan
  - SMS Uskoke
  - SMS Velebit
  - SMS Wildfang
- SMS Warasdiner (1912)

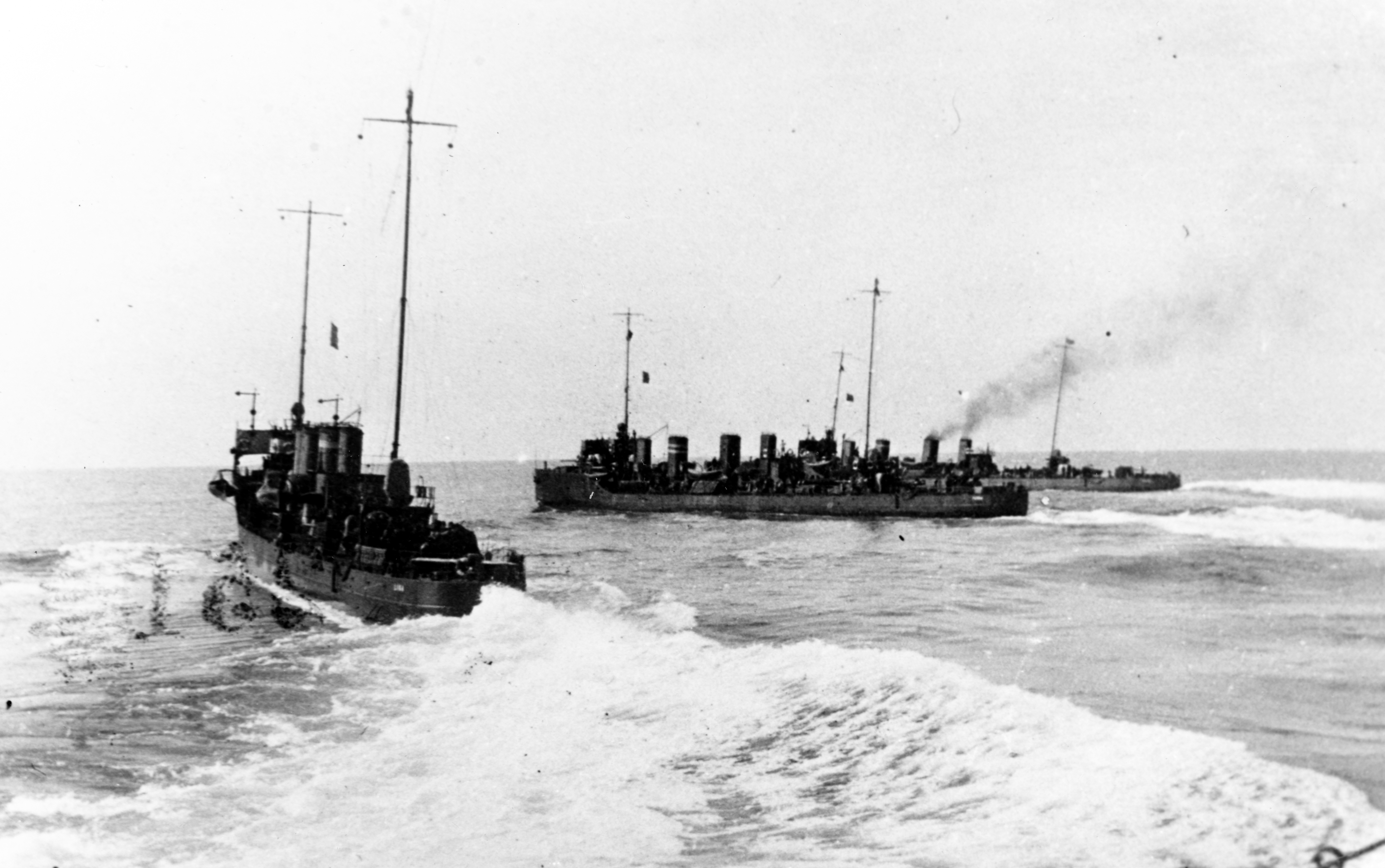
Three Tátra-class destroyers on maneuvers circa 1914; Lika on the left and Tátra in the center

- Tátra-class destroyer – 10 ships (1912–1917)
  - SMS Balaton
  - SMS Csepel
  - SMS Lika (1913)
  - SMS Orjen
  - SMS Tátra
  - SMS Triglav (1913)
- Ersatz Triglav class
  - SMS Dukla
  - SMS Lika (1917)
  - SMS Triglav (1917)
  - SMS Uzsok

== Submarines ==
- U-1-class Lake Type Submarines – 2 ships
  - SM U-1
  - SM U-2
- U-3 class Germaniawerft type Submarines – 2 ships
  - SM U-3
  - SM U-4
- U-5 class Holland Type Submarines – 3 ships
  - SM U-5
  - SM U-6
  - SM U-12 Temporarily Designated U-7
- U-7 class Sold to Germany – 5 ships
  - SMS U-7 Sold as U-66 1914
  - SMS U-8 Sold as U-67 1914
  - SMS U-9 Sold as U-68 1914
  - SMS U-10 Sold as U-69 1914
  - SMS U-11 Sold as U-70 1914
- U-10 class German UB I class Submarine – 9 ships
  - SMS U-7 (Ex-German SM UB-7 was returned to the German navy)
  - SMS U-8 (Ex-German SM UB-8 was returned to the German navy)
  - SMS U-9 (temporary Austrian number for German SM UB-3 when operating in the Mediterranean)
  - SM U-10 Ex-German UB-1
  - SM U-11 Ex-German UB-15
  - SM U-15
  - SM U-16
  - SM U-17
  - SM U-26 (temporary Austrian number for German SM UB-14 when operating in the Mediterranean)
- Brumaire-class submarine – 1 ship
  - SM U-14 Ex-French Curie
- German Type UC I submarine Mine-layer Submarines – 4 ships
  - SM U-18 (temporary Austrian number for German SM UC-14 when operating in the Mediterranean)
  - SM U-19 (temporary Austrian number for German SM UC-15 when operating in the Mediterranean)
  - SM U-24 (temporary Austrian number for German SM UC-12 when operating in the Mediterranean)
  - SM U-25 (temporary Austrian number for German SM UC-13 when operating in the Mediterranean)
- U-20 class – 4 ships
  - SM U-20
  - SM U-21
  - SM U-22
  - SM U-23
- U-27 class Modified German UB II Class built in Austria-Hungary – 8 ships
  - SM U-27
  - SM U-28
  - SM U-29
  - SM U-30
  - SM U-31
  - SM U-32
  - SM U-40
  - SM U-41
- German Type U 31 submarine – 6 ships
  - SM U-33 (temporary Austrian number for German SM U-33 when operating in the Mediterranean)
  - SM U-34 (temporary Austrian number for German SM U-34 when operating in the Mediterranean)
  - SM U-35 (temporary Austrian number for German SM U-35 when operating in the Mediterranean)
  - SM U-37 (temporary Austrian number for German SM U-32 when operating in the Mediterranean)
  - SM U-38 (temporary Austrian number for German SM U-38 when operating in the Mediterranean)
  - SM U-39 (temporary Austrian number for German SM U-39 when operating in the Mediterranean)
- Type U 19 submarine – 1 ship
  - SM U-36 (temporary Austrian number for German SM U-21 when operating in the Mediterranean)
- German Type U 43 submarine – 1 ship
  - SM U-36 (temporary Austrian number for German SM U-47 when operating in the Mediterranean)
- U-43-class submarine (Austria-Hungary) German UB II class Submarine – 6 ships
  - SM U-42 (temporary Austrian number for German SM UB-42 when operating in the Mediterranean)
  - SM U-43 Ex-German UB-43 Purchased from Germany
  - SM U-44 (temporary Austrian number for German SM UB-44 when operating in the Mediterranean)
  - SM U-45 (temporary Austrian number for German SM UB-45 when operating in the Mediterranean)
  - SM U-46 (temporary Austrian number for German SM UB-46 when operating in the Mediterranean)
  - SM U-47 Ex-German UB-47 Purchased from Germany
- U-48-class submarine Started 1916 never completed – 4 ships
  - SM U-48
  - SM U-49
  - SM U-58 Ordered 1918 never Started
  - SM U-59 Ordered 1918 never Started
- U-50-class submarine Started 1916 never completed – 4 ships
  - SM U-50
  - SM U-51
  - SM U-56 Ordered 1918 never Started
  - SM U-57 Ordered 1918 never Started
- U-52-class submarine Started 1916 never completed – 4 ships
  - SM U-52
  - SM U-53
  - SM U-54 Ordered 1917 never Started
  - SM U-55 Ordered 1917 never Started
- German Type UC II submarine Mine-layer Submarines – 19 ships
  - SM U-60 (temporary Austrian number for German SM UC-20 when operating in the Mediterranean)
  - SM U-61 (temporary Austrian number for German SM UC-23 when operating in the Mediterranean)
  - SM U-62 (temporary Austrian number for German SM UC-22 when operating in the Mediterranean)
  - SM U-66 (temporary Austrian number for German SM UC-66 when operating in the Mediterranean)
  - SM U-69 (temporary Austrian number for German SM UC-69 when operating in the Mediterranean)
  - SM U-74 (temporary Austrian number for German SM UC-34 when operating in the Mediterranean)
  - SM U-75 (temporary Austrian number for German SM UC-35 when operating in the Mediterranean)
  - SM U-76 (temporary Austrian number for German SM UC-36 when operating in the Mediterranean)
  - SM U-77 (temporary Austrian number for German SM UC-37 when operating in the Mediterranean)
  - SM U-78 (temporary Austrian number for German SM UC-38 when operating in the Mediterranean)
  - SM U-88 (temporary Austrian number for German SM UC-24 when operating in the Mediterranean)
  - SM U-89 (temporary Austrian number for German SM UC-25 when operating in the Mediterranean)
  - SM U-90 (temporary Austrian number for German SM UC-27 when operating in the Mediterranean)
  - SM U-91 (temporary Austrian number for German SM UC-67 when operating in the Mediterranean)
  - SM U-92 (temporary Austrian number for German SM UC-73 when operating in the Mediterranean)
  - SM U-93 (temporary Austrian number for German SM UC-74 when operating in the Mediterranean)
  - SM U-94 (temporary Austrian number for German SM UC-52 when operating in the Mediterranean)
  - SM U-95 (temporary Austrian number for German SM UC-53 when operating in the Mediterranean)
  - SM U-96 (temporary Austrian number for German SM UC-54 when operating in the Mediterranean)
- German Type U 63 submarine – 3 ships
  - SM U-63 (temporary Austrian number for German SM U-63 when operating in the Mediterranean)
  - SM U-64 (temporary Austrian number for German SM U-64 when operating in the Mediterranean)
  - SM U-65 (temporary Austrian number for German SM U-65 when operating in the Mediterranean)
- German Type UB III submarine – 20 ships
  - SM U-66 (temporary Austrian number for German SM UB-66 when operating in the Mediterranean)
  - SM U-67 (temporary Austrian number for German SM UB-67 when operating in the Mediterranean)
  - SM U-68 (temporary Austrian number for German SM UB-68 when operating in the Mediterranean)
  - SM U-69 (temporary Austrian number for German SM UB-69 when operating in the Mediterranean)
  - SM U-70 (temporary Austrian number for German SM UB-70 when operating in the Mediterranean)
  - SM U-71 (temporary Austrian number for German SM UB-71 when operating in the Mediterranean)
  - SM U-79 (temporary Austrian number for German SM UB-48 when operating in the Mediterranean)
  - SM U-80 (temporary Austrian number for German SM UB-49 when operating in the Mediterranean)
  - SM U-81 (temporary Austrian number for German SM UB-50 when operating in the Mediterranean)
  - SM U-82 (temporary Austrian number for German SM UB-51 when operating in the Mediterranean)
  - SM U-83 (temporary Austrian number for German SM UB-52 when operating in the Mediterranean)
  - SM U-84 (temporary Austrian number for German SM UB-53 when operating in the Mediterranean)
  - SM U-97 (temporary Austrian number for German SM UB-105 when operating in the Mediterranean)
  - SM U-98 (temporary Austrian number for German SM UB-128 when operating in the Mediterranean)
  - SM U-99 (temporary Austrian number for German SM UB-129 when operating in the Mediterranean)
  - SM U-133 (temporary Austrian number for German SM UB-133 planned but not completed)
  - SM U-134 (temporary Austrian number for German SM UB-134 planned but not completed)
  - SM U-135 (temporary Austrian number for German SM UB-135 planned but not completed)
  - SM U-146 (temporary Austrian number for German SM UB-146 planned but not completed)
  - SM U-147 (temporary Austrian number for German SM UB-147 planned but not completed)
- German Type UE I submarine Mine-layer Submarines – 2 ships
  - SM U-72 (temporary Austrian number for German SM U-72 when operating in the Mediterranean)
  - SM U-73 (temporary Austrian number for German SM U-73 when operating in the Mediterranean)
- U-101-class submarine Meant to replace U1-U6 and then adopt those numbers – 9 ships
  - SM U-101 Ex-U-88 Laid down 1917 never completed
  - SM U-102 Ex-U-89 Laid down 1918 never completed
  - SM U-103 Ex-U-90 Laid down 1918 never completed
  - SM U-104 Ex-U-91 never started
  - SM U-105 Ex-U-92 never started
  - SM U-106 Ex-U-93 never started
  - SM U-118 never started
  - SM U-119 never started
  - SM U-120 never started
- U-107-class submarine Laid down 1918 never completed, numbers planned up to U-141 – 4 ships
  - SM U-107 Ex-U-94
  - SM U-108 Ex-U-95
  - SM U-109 Ex-U-96
  - SM U-110 Ex-U-97
- German Type UC III submarine – 2 ships
  - SM U-99 (temporary Austrian number for German SM UC-103 when operating in the Mediterranean)
  - SM U-110 (temporary Austrian number for German SM UC-108 when operating in the Mediterranean)

== River monitors ==
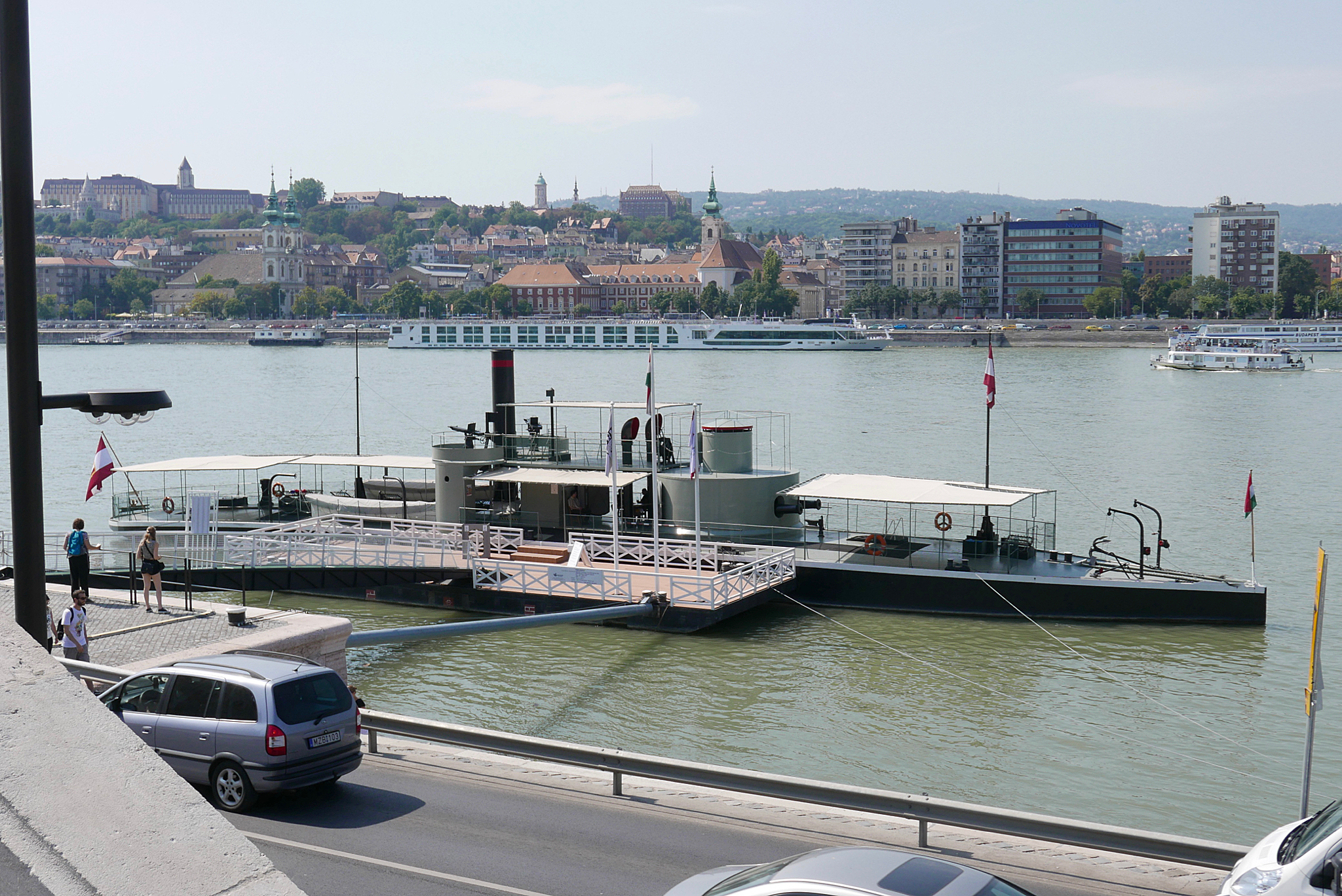
SMS Leitha preserved as a museum ship in Budapest

- Leitha-class river monitor
  - SMS Maros (1871)
  - SMS Leitha (1871)
- Körös-class river monitor
  - SMS Körös
  - SMS Szamos (1892)
- Temes-class river monitor
  - SMS Temes
  - SMS Bodrog (1904)
- Enns-class river monitor
  - SMS Enns
  - SMS Inn
- Sava-class river monitor
  - SMS Sava
  - SMS Temes (II)/Bonsa (1915)
- SMS Nr XI and SMS Nr XII (Planned 1917 but never laid down)

== Gunboats ==
=== Paddle gunboats ===
- SMS Rad-Dampf-Kanonenboot Nr. I (1859) – River Danube
- Nr. I class – Lagoon
  - SMS Rad-Dampfer-Kanonenboot Nr. I (1860)
  - SMS Rad-Dampfer-Kanonenboot Nr. II (1860)
  - SMS Rad-Dampfer-Kanonenboot Nr. III (1860)
  - SMS Rad-Dampfer-Kanonenboot Nr. IV (1860)

=== Screw gunboats ===
- SMS Möwe (1859)
- SMS Schrauben-Kanonenboot Nr. II (1859) – River Danube
- Kerka class
  - SMS Kerka (1860)
  - SMS Narenta (1860)
- Pelikan class – Lagoon
  - SMS Pelikan (1860)
  - SMS Ausluger (1860)
  - SMS Deutschmeister (1860)
- Raufbold class – Lake Garda
  - SMS Raufbold (1860)
  - SMS Speiteufel (1860)
  - SMS Uskoke (1860)
  - SMS Scharfschütze (1860)
  - SMS Wespe (1860)
  - SMS Wildfang (1860)
- Dalmat class
  - SMS Dalmat (1861)
  - SMS Hum (1861)
  - SMS Welebich (1861)
- Reka class
  - SMS Reka (1861)
  - SMS Wall (1861)
  - SMS Streiter (1861)
  - SMS Seehund (1861)
- Grille class
  - SMS Grille (1861)
  - SMS Sansego (1861)
  - SMS Gemse (1861)
- Albatros class
  - SMS Albatros (1873)
  - SMS Nautilus (1873)

=== River gunboats ===
- Fogas class (1915)
  - SMS Fogas – Renamed Gödöllő postwar in Hungarian service
  - SMS Csuka – Renamed Siófok postwar in Hungarian service
- Wels class (1915)
  - SMS Wels – Renamed Szeged postwar in Hungarian service
  - SMS Barsch – Renamed Baja postwar in Hungarian service
  - SMS Compó – Renamed Győr postwar in Hungarian service
  - SMS Viza – Renamed Kecskemét postwar in Hungarian service
- Stör class (1918) – 3 planned but only 2 were completed
  - SMS Stör – Renamed Sopron postwar in Hungarian service
  - SMS Lachs – Renamed Debrecen postwar in Hungarian service

== Minelayers ==
- SMS Dromedar
- SMS Salamander
- SMS Basilisk
- SMS Chamäleon

== Armed Merchants ==
=== Cruising Steamers ===
- SMS Adria
- SMS Cetina
- SMS Cirkvenica
- SMS Frankopan
- SMS Kvarner

=== Submarine hunters ===
- SMS Arsa
- SMS Knin
- SMS Liburnia
- SMS Makarska
- SMS Monfalcone
- SMS Nesazio
- SMS Novi
- SMS Pelagosa
- SMS Sebenico (1898)
- SMS Senj
- SMS Slavija
- SMS Tatra (1905)
- SMS Zadar

=== Patrol ships ===
- SMS Bilinksi
- SMS Dolfin
- SMS Neretva
- SMS Quarnero
- SMS Risano
- SMS San Mauro
- SMS Valona
- SMS Vodice

=== Gunboats ===
- SMS Kanonenboot I Ex-Trieste
- SMS Kanonenboot I Ex-San Marco Di Rosandra
- SMS Kanonenboot II Ex-Epulo
- SMS Kanonenboot III Ex-San Guisto

=== Submarine depot ships ===
- SMS Gäa
- SMS Pelikan

=== River Gunboat ===
- SMS Almos
- SMS Csobanc
- SMS Helene
- SMS Samson
- SMS Szigliget
- SMS Una
- SMS Vag

=== River Minelayer ===
- SMS Balaton

=== River Minesweeper ===
- SMS Baja
- SMS Bacska
- SMS Andor
- SMS Bataszek

== Auxiliary ships ==
=== Colliers and Oilers ===
- Pola class
  - SMS Pola
  - SMS Teodo
- SMS Vesta ex-Etelka
- SMS Prometeo unnamed oiler
- SMS Dampfer I ex-Corsinia
- SMS Dampfer II ex-Izvor
- SMS Dampfer VII ex-Amphitrite
- SMS Dampfer VIII ex-Fiume
- SMS Dampfer XI ex-Austria
- SMS Bellaura
- SMS Jason
- SMS Radium
- SMS Sirena Changed to depot ship

=== Water Carriers ===
- SMS Najade
- SMS Nymphe
- SMS Nixe (1903)
- SMS WT.250 (1918)

=== Salvage ships ===
- SMS Herkules
- SMS Gigant

=== Tugs ===
- SMS Pluto Rescue tug
- SMS Titan Rescue tug
- SMS Hippos
- SMS Büffel

=== Sea rescue vessels ===
- SMS Belrorie
- SMS Cyclops

=== Submarine depot ships ===
- SMS Bellenden

=== Destroyer depot ships ===
- SMS Dampfer IV ex-Gastein (also served as armed troopship)

=== Mine depot ships ===
- SMS Dampfer V Ex-Carniolia
- SMS Dampfer XIII Ex-Urano

=== Ammunition ships ===
- SMS Dampfer III Ex-Goritia
- SMS Dampfer VI Ex-Bucovina
- SMS Dampfer XIII Ex-Urano
- SMS Dampfer XIII (1900) Ex-Styria
- SMS Brioni

=== Cargo ships ===
- SMS Dampfer IX Ex-Baron Call converted to hospital ship
- SMS Dampfer XIV Ex-Bosnia
- SMS Dampfer XVIII Ex-Kephallonia captured Greek freighter
- SMS Dampfer XIX Ex-Hrvat
- SMS Dampfer XIX Ex-Zichy
- SMS Dampfer XX Ex-Fram
- SMS Daniel Erno
- SMS Maria
- SMS Magyar
- SMS Sarajevo

=== Troop ships ===
- SMS Euterpe
- SMS Gödöllö
- SMS Salona

=== Hospital ships ===
- SMS Dampfer X Ex-Africa
- SMS Argentina Austrian Red Cross
- SMS Elektra Austrian Red Cross
- SMS Graf Wurmbrand Austrian Red Cross
- SMS Metkovich Austrian Red Cross
- SMS Oceania Austrian Red Cross
- SMS Tirol Austrian Red Cross
- SMS Erzherzog Franz Ferdinand River hospital ship
- SMS Kulpa River hospital ship
- SMS Traisen River hospital ship

=== Repair Ships ===
- SMS Cyclop (1871)
- SMS Vulcan Ex-Prinz Eugen 1877

=== Accommodation Ships ===
- SMS Cleopatra
- SMS Habsburg (1895)
- SMS Pannonia
- SMS Semiramis
- SMS Trieste
- SMS Wien (1911) (doubled as Hospital Ship)
