= SMS Cormoran =

Two ships have been known as SMS Cormoran:

- SMS Cormoran (1892), an unprotected cruiser built by the German Kaiserliche Marine
- SMS Cormoran (1914), a Russian transport ship captured by the German raider SMS Emden and commissioned as an auxiliary cruiser during World War I

== See also ==
- SMS Kormoran, an Austro-Hungarian torpedo boat
- Auxiliary cruiser Kormoran (1938), a World War II merchant raider for the Kriegsmarine
