= Sperber =

Sperber may refer to:

- Focke-Wulf A 33 Sperber, a small German airliner produced in the early 1930s
- Sportavia Sperber, a variant of the Fournier RF 5 aircraft
- Sperber (surname)
- SMS Sperber, three ships of the Prussian, German, or Austro-Hungarian navies
