= Sperber (surname) =

Sperber is a German surname, which means "sparrowhawk", from the Middle High German sperwære. In the Elizabethan era, it was not uncommon to refer to someone as "sparrow" as a term of endearment or, as evidenced in William Shakespeare's "Hamlet," as a star-crossed lover. Variants of the name include Sparber and von Sperber.

Notable people with the name include:

- Ann M. Sperber (1935–1994), American biographer
- Dan Sperber (born 1942), French anthropologist
- Daniel Sperber (born 1940), Israeli historian
- Devorah Sperber (born 1961), American artist
- Ed Sperber (1895–1976), American baseball player
- Isadore Sparber (1906–1958), American filmmaker
- Jonathan Sperber (born 1952), American historian
- Klaus Sperber (1944–1983), German singer
- Manès Sperber (1905–1984), French writer
- Milo Sperber (1911–1992), British actor
- Monique Canto-Sperber (born 1954), French philosopher
- Paula Sperber (born circa 1951), American ten-pin bowler and wife of ten-pin bowler Don Carter
- Murray Sperber (born 1939), American writer
- Silvia Sperber (born 1965), German sports shooter
- Wendie Jo Sperber (1958–2005), American actress

== See also ==
- Sperber (disambiguation)
