= SMS Sperber =

At least three ships of the Prussian Navy (and later Imperial German Navy) or Austro-Hungarian Navy had been named SMS Sperber:

- SMS Sperber (1860), a Prussian Jäger-class gunboat built in the 1860s
- SMS Sperber (1886), an Austro-Hungarian Schichau-class torpedo boat built in the 1880s
- SMS Sperber (1888), a German Schwalbe-class unprotected cruiser built in the 1880s
