= Kaiman-class torpedo boat =

Austro-Hungarian warships in World War I

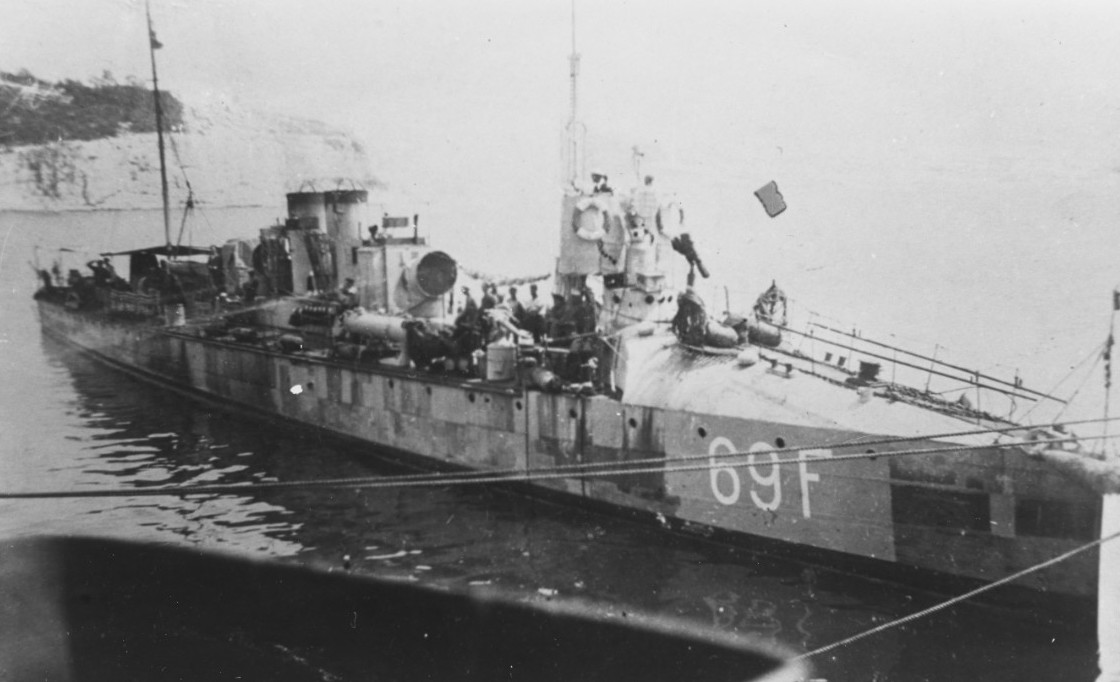
- 69 F (later renamed T11) photographed in 1916

Class overview
- Builders: Yarrow Shipbuilders; Stabilimento Tecnico Triestino; Ganz & Danubius
- Operators: Austro-Hungarian Navy; (Kingdom of Yugoslavia) Navy of the Kingdom of Serbs, Croats and Slovenes
- Preceded by: Cobra class
- Succeeded by: 110t class
- Built: 1904–1910
- In commission: 1905–1930
- Completed: 24

General characteristics
- Type: Sea-going torpedo boat
- Displacement: 209–211 t (206–208 long tons) (full load)
- Length: 56 m (183 ft 9 in)
- Beam: 5.5 m (18 ft 1 in)
- Draught: 1.3 m (4 ft 3 in)
- Installed power: 2 × Yarrow boilers; 3,000 ihp (2,200 kW)
- Propulsion: 1 × shaft; 1 × triple expansion engine
- Speed: 26 knots (48 km/h; 30 mph)
- Endurance: 500 nmi (930 km; 580 mi) at 26 knots (48 km/h; 30 mph); 1,030 nmi (1,910 km; 1,190 mi) at 16 knots (30 km/h; 18 mph)
- Complement: 31
- Armament: 4 × 47 mm (1.9 in) L/33 guns; 3 × 450 mm (17.7 in) torpedo tubes

The Kaiman class were high-seas torpedo boats built for the Austro-Hungarian Navy between 1904 and 1910. A total of 24 boats were built by three shipbuilding companies. Yarrow Shipbuilders built the lead ship, Stabilimento Tecnico Triestino of Trieste built 13 boats, and Ganz-Danubius constructed the remaining 10 boats at their shipyards at Fiume. The class was considered to be a successful design, and all boats saw extensive active service during World War I, undertaking a range of tasks, including escort duties, shore bombardments, and minesweeping. All survived, although several were damaged by naval mines and collisions. One was torpedoed and badly damaged by a French submarine, and two sank an Italian submarine. All the boats were transferred to the Allies and scrapped at the end of the war, except for four that were allocated to the navy of the newly created Kingdom of Serbs, Croats and Slovenes. These were discarded and broken up between 1928 and 1930.

== Design and construction ==
After the commissioning of the last of four Cobra-class torpedo boats for the Austro-Hungarian Navy in 1900, there was a four-year hiatus in Austro-Hungarian construction of destroyers and torpedo boats. In 1904, a prototype of a new torpedo boat was ordered from Yarrow Shipbuilders at Poplar, London, and this became the lead boat of the Kaiman class. The name was in keeping with other reptilian names given to sea-going vessels. Two Austro-Hungarian naval shipbuilders then received plans and engineering assistance from the British and commenced construction; 13 boats were built by Stabilimento Tecnico Triestino, located at Trieste, and the remaining 10 boats by Ganz-Danubius at their shipyards at Fiume. All boats used a single four-cylinder vertical triple expansion engine driving one propeller shaft using steam generated by two coal-fired Yarrow boilers. They had a waterline length of 56 m (183 ft 9 in), a beam of 5.5 m (18 ft 1 in), and a normal draught of 1.3 m (4 ft 3 in). They had a standard displacement of about 209–211 tonnes (206–208 long tons). Their machinery was rated at 3,000 indicated horsepower (2,200 kW) and was designed to propel the boats to a top speed of 26 knots (48 km/h; 30 mph). They carried 47 tonnes (46 long tons) of coal, which gave them a radius of action of 500 nautical miles (930 km; 580 mi) at 26 knots (48 km/h; 30 mph), or 1,030 nmi (1,910 km; 1,190 mi) at 16 knots (30 km/h; 18 mph). The crew consisted of 31 officers and enlisted men. (Note: Gardiner gives a complement of 38.)

They were armed with four Škoda 47 mm (1.9 in) L/33 (Note: L/33 denotes the length of the barrel. In this case, the L/33 gun is 33 calibre, meaning that the barrel was 33 times as long as the diameter of its bore.) guns and three 450 mm (17.7 in) torpedo tubes. The 47 mm guns were license-built versions of the British QF 3-pounder Hotchkiss gun; they had a rate of fire of 25 rounds per minute and an effective range of 3,000 m (9,800 ft). The 450 mm torpedoes were the L/5 type, which carried a 95 kg (209 lb) warhead and had a range of 3,000 m at a speed of 32 knots (59 km/h; 37 mph). Later variants increased the warhead to 110 kg (240 lb) and the range to 6,000 m (20,000 ft) at 27 knots (50 km/h; 31 mph). In 1915, one 8 mm (0.31 in) machine gun was added. The boats were initially given names, but were redesignated with numbers on 1 January 1914, with three suffixes; E for the Yarrow boat built in England, T for the boats built in Trieste, and F for the boats built in Fiume.

Construction of Kaiman-class torpedo boats
Initial name	Laid down	Launched	Completed	Redesignated
Kaiman	October 1904	3 June 1905	14 September 1905	50 E
Anaconda	11 October 1905	8 May 1906	21 September 1906	51 T
Alligator	20 October 1905	30 June 1906	31 December 1906	52 T
Krokodil	14 November 1905	25 July 1906	31 December 1906	53 T
Wal	12 December 1905	10 September 1906	15 June 1907	54 T
Seehund	29 December 1905	15 September 1906	15 June 1907	55 T
Delphin	12 May 1906	29 November 1906	15 June 1907	56 T
Narwal	19 June 1906	17 December 1906	15 June 1908	57 T
Hai	9 July 1906	24 March 1907	15 June 1908	58 T
Möve	1 August 1906	30 March 1907	15 June 1908	59 T
Schwalbe	14 September 1906	8 April 1907	20 March 1909	60 T
Pinguin	18 September 1906	18 April 1907	20 March 1909	61 T
Drache	January 1907	13 July 1907	20 March 1909	62 T
Greif	January 1907	8 July 1907	20 March 1909	63 T
Triton	26 July 1907	18 July 1908	31 December 1908	64 F
Hydra	31 July 1907	11 October 1908	19 January 1909	65 F
Skorpion	14 August 1907	15 November 1908	22 January 1909	66 F
Phönix	7 January 1908	10 January 1909	3 August 1909	67 F
Krake	2 June 1908	7 February 1909	15 September 1909	68 F
Polyp	27 July 1908	17 April 1909	15 September 1909	69 F
Echse	22 October 1908	8 May 1909	15 June 1910	70 F
Molch	21 November 1908	14 July 1909	15 June 1910	71 F
Kormoran	13 January 1909	31 July 1909	5 March 1910	72 F
Alk	12 February 1909	2 October 1909	15 June 1910	73 F

== Service history ==
=== World War I ===
==== 1914 ====
At the outbreak of World War I, the Kaiman-class torpedo boats were split between the 1st and 2nd Torpedo Flotillas, based at Cattaro and Pola respectively. In the 1st Torpedo Flotilla, led by the scout cruiser Saida commanded by Linienschiffskapitän (Captain) Heinrich Seitz, the 3rd Torpedo Division had two groups of Kaiman-class boats: 50 E, 51 T and 73 F made up the 2nd Torpedo Boat Group, and 53 T, 54 T and 56 T made up the 3rd Torpedo Boat Group. In the 2nd Torpedo Flotilla, led by the scout cruiser Admiral Spaun commanded by Linienschiffskapitän Benno von Millenkovich, the 5th Torpedo Division had three groups of the class: 55 T, 68 F and 70 F made up the 4th Torpedo Boat Group; 61 T, 65 F and 66 F comprised the 5th Torpedo Boat Group; and 64 F, 69 F and 72 F made up the 6th Torpedo Boat Group. Also in the 2nd Torpedo Flotilla, the 6th Torpedo Division had three more groups of Kaiman-class boats: 52 T, 58 T and 59 T were in the 7th Torpedo Boat Group; 60 T, 62 T and 63 T made up the 8th Torpedo Boat Group; and 57 T, 67 F and 72 F comprised the 9th Torpedo Boat Group. The 1st and 2nd Torpedo Flotillas were supported by the mother ships Gäa and Dampfer IV respectively.

The concept of operation for the Kaiman-class boats was that they would sail in a flotilla at the rear of a cruising battle formation, and were to intervene in fighting only if the battleships around which the formation was established were disabled, or in order to attack damaged enemy battleships. When a torpedo attack was ordered, it was to be led by a scout cruiser, supported by two destroyers to repel any enemy torpedo boats. A group of four to six torpedo boats would deliver the attack under the direction of the flotilla commander.

The Kaiman class was considered to be a very capable design, and all boats saw significant active service during the war. All survived, although several were badly damaged by naval mines and collisions. On 24 July 1914, two days before Austria-Hungary began mobilising, three Kaiman-class boats accompanied Admiral Spaun and three Huszár-class destroyers from Pola to the Bocche di Cattaro, but Admiral Spaun returned on 2 August to avoid being blockaded in the bay by stronger Allied forces. War with Montenegro began three days later, and on 8 August, 72 F accompanied the protected cruisers Zenta and Szigetvár and the Huszár-class destroyer Uskoke during a shore bombardment of Antivari in Montenegro, targeting a Wireless station at Voluvica and the railway station and magazines at Antivari harbour. It was intended that a blockade of Antivari and the Montenegrin coast would be maintained by Zenta and Szigetvár, supported by the destroyers and torpedo boats, but when Zenta was sunk by Allied ships on 13 August, the brief blockade effectively ended.

On 2 September, another shore bombardment of the Montenegrin coast was conducted by the Huszár-class destroyers Scharfschütze and Ulan, assisted by 64 F and 66 F. On 16 September, 68 F and 72 F were involved in a raid and landing at San Giovanni di Medua on the Albanian coast. The French submarine Cugnot slipped between the protective minefields outside the Bocche di Cattaro and entered the bay on 29 November, but she was spotted by 57 T, commanded by Linienschiffsleutnant Albert Heinz-Erian, who raised the alarm. The destroyers Ulan and Blitz, along with the Schichau-class torpedo boat No. 36, chased Cugnot, which was intending to attack the ironclad Kronprinz Erzherzog Rudolf. Cugnot struck an underwater obstacle and cancelled the attack, and 57 T fired a torpedo at her, but the torpedo missed because its depth was set too low. Cugnot then escaped from the bay and out through the minefield gap. On 20 December, the French submarine Curie posed a serious threat when she entered the harbour at Pola and became tangled in anti-submarine net cables. After four hours of fruitless attempts to free herself, she surfaced and was attacked by 63 T, the Schichau-class torpedo boats Nos. 24 and 39, the Huszár-class destroyer Turul, the older Schichau-built destroyer Satellit, some smaller auxiliaries of the 1st Mine Command, and the "Cristo" coastal artillery battery. Curie was sunk by gunfire, but only one crew member was killed and another died of his wounds. Curie was later raised and re-commissioned as SM U-14.

==== 1915 ====
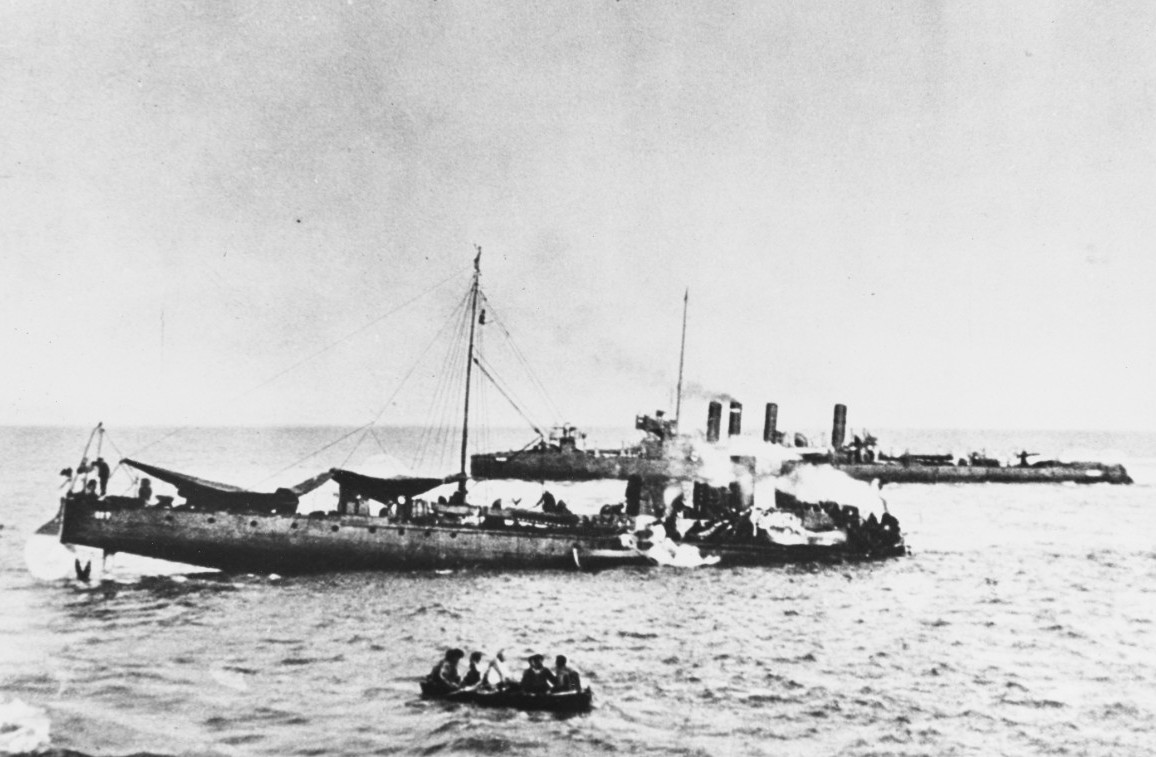
The French submarine Papin torpedoed 51 T in September 1915.

On 14 February 1915, 68 F, the Huszár-class destroyer Csikos and the Cobra-class torpedo boat SMS 15 bombarded Dulcigno and Antivari on the Montenegrin coastline, and searched for the Montenegrin royal yacht Rumija which was being employed towing lighters with supplies from Medova in Albania to Antivari and into the Bojana estuary. Their shelling of the harbour was disrupted by fire from coastal batteries, and the ships withdrew after laying some mines in the harbour and shelling Cape Crni. On 24 February, the French destroyer Dague was escorting two steam ships into Antivari harbour when she struck one of the mines laid on 14 February. Dague broke up and sank with half her crew.

On the night of 1/2 March, the Huszár-class destroyers Ulan, Csikos and Streiter, accompanied by 57 T, 66 F and 67 F, attacked Antivari. The destroyers covered the torpedo boats from outside the harbour while the torpedo boats entered. 67 F destroyed the old long wooden pier with a torpedo and 66 F laid mines near the new pier. Rumija was captured and a prize crew was put aboard, but a strong gale prevented 57 T from taking her in tow, so instead she sank Rumija with a torpedo. This attack was a severe blow for the Montenegrins, as they lost the only ship they could use to tow smaller sailing vessels and lighters, and the destruction of the old longer pier meant that the unloading of larger steam ships was no longer possible. Three days later, 57 T returned to bombard Antivari. The constant Austro-Hungarian attacks, combined with the expectation that Italy would soon enter the war on the Allied side, meant that the French abandoned their efforts to supply Antivari by sea.

As expected, Italy declared war on Austria-Hungary on the afternoon of 23 May, and almost the entire Austro-Hungarian fleet left Pola soon after to deliver an immediate response against Italian cities and towns along the Adriatic coast, aiming to interdict land and sea transport between southern Italy and the northern regions of that country which were expected to be a theatre of land operations. The fleet split into six groups with a range of targets up and down the coast. Group A included three dreadnought battleships, six pre-dreadnought battleships, and four destroyers, accompanied by 50 E, 51 T, 53 T – 54 T, 57 T – 58 T, 60 T, 62 T – 63 T, 67 F–70 F, and 72 F, four 250t-class torpedo boats and six seaplanes, and participated in the Bombardment of Ancona, a shore bombardment operation against the northern Adriatic coast of Italy. The bombardment began at 04:04 on 24 May, and caused significant damage in the shipyard, killing 68, 30 of them military personnel, and wounding 150. The destroyers entered the harbour and launched several torpedoes, sinking one steam ship and damaging two others. Group A withdrew after 05:00 when news was received of Italian submarines leaving Venice en route to Pola. Group C, consisting of the pre-dreadnought Radetzky escorted by 56 T and 73 F, bombarded Potenza Picena, Termoli and Campomarino, damaging some bridges.

On 18 June, the armoured cruiser Sankt Georg conducted a bombardment of a bridge near Rimini, accompanied by 57 T, 58 T, 63 T and 67 F. On the same day, Szigetvár, 64 F and 69 F bombarded Colonnella, sinking one freighter during the shelling, and sinking two motor schooners encountered off Rimini following the bombardment. The Italian submarine Velella and 65 T engaged in a torpedo duel outside the entrance to Cattero Bay on 17 August, but neither vessel was damaged. On 9 September 1915, 51 T was torpedoed and had her bow blown off by the French submarine Papin while she was returning with the rest of the 1st Torpedo Flotilla from an operation which confirmed that the Italians had abandoned the mid-Adriatic island of Pelagosa. She was towed to port and repaired.

On the night of 4/5 December, Novara, escorted by three destroyers, and 61 T, 66 F and 67 F, left Cattaro Bay to attack Medova. During the raid, several merchant ships and a French submarine were destroyed. A seaplane attack on Ancona on 9 December was supported by 57T and 58T, accompanying the protected cruiser Szigetvár, two destroyers and three 250t-class torpedo boats. Another seaplane attack, this time on Rimini on 14 December, was supported by 68 F and 69 F, along with Szigetvár, two destroyers and three 250t-class torpedo boats.

==== 1916 ====
On New Year's Day 1916, the Austro-Hungarians began preparations for an assault on the Lovćen mountain range – located in the hinterland south of the Bocche – supported by both land and naval bombardments. A week later, 52 T, 65 F, 67 F and 73 F accompanied the protected cruiser Aspern in a bombardment of Montenegrin troop positions in the mountains. On 22 February, 70 F and three 250t-class torpedo boats laid a minefield outside Antivari harbour.

On 9 July 1916, Novara, 54 T, 73 F and another torpedo boat raided the Otranto Barrage, the Allied naval blockade of the Strait of Otranto, which resulted in the sinking of two drifters, and damage to two more. Five days later, the Italian submarine Balilla was spotted by the observation post on the island of Lissa, and 65 F and 66 F responded to the report. The torpedo boats initially attacked using paravanes, but 65 F was damaged by hers while steaming backwards. Balilla and 65 F then exchanged torpedoes, but both missed. The torpedo boats also engaged Balilla with their deck guns. Damaged, Balilla dived and surfaced twice, probably uncontrolled, then sank. The damaged 65 F was towed to Pola for repairs, and the loss of Balilla resulted in the Italians withdrawing submarine patrols closer to the Otranto Barrage. On 1 August, a large Italian air raid on Fiume was intercepted by Austro-Hungarian aircraft, including one flown by the flying ace Gottfried Freiherr von Banfield, and he drove off three bombers and forced another down. The downed aircraft was towed to Pola by 69 F. On 7 October, 68 F was transporting supplies to the seaplane station at Durazzo when she encountered four Indomito-class destroyers, with another four apparently also in the area. The crew of the torpedo boat jettisoned the supplies and aircraft bombs and evaded the Italian ships. On the following day, the same boat encountered the Italian Rosolino Pilo-class destroyer Pilade Bronzetti off San Giovanni di Medua, but after a brief chase was able to reach the cover of a shore battery.

==== 1917–1918 ====
At the beginning of 1917, the 2nd Torpedo Flotilla, consisting of Admiral Spaun, Huszár-class destroyers and the Kaiman-class torpedo boats, was based out of Pola. On 21 May 1917, the suffix of all Austro-Hungarian torpedo boats was removed, and thereafter they were referred to only by the numeral. On 16 November 1917, 61 and 65 were part of a minesweeping force supporting the bombardment of a 152 mm (6.0 in) Italian shore battery at Cortellazzo near the mouth of the Piave. All boats were due to have their aft torpedo tube replaced by a single Škoda 66 mm (2.6 in) L/30 anti-aircraft gun in late 1918, but it is not clear whether this actually occurred. 52 ran aground near Split in December 1918.

=== Interwar period ===
Following World War I, the Kaiman-class boats were allocated to Great Britain, Italy and the new Kingdom of Serbs, Croats and Slovenes, which was later renamed Yugoslavia. Great Britain and Italy scrapped their boats, but the Yugoslavs retained 54, 60, 61 and 69 as T12, T9, T10 and T11 respectively. All four were discarded and broken up between 1928 and 1930.

== See also ==
- List of ships of the Royal Yugoslav Navy
