= Schichau-class torpedo boat =

Class of Austro-Hungarian torpedo boats

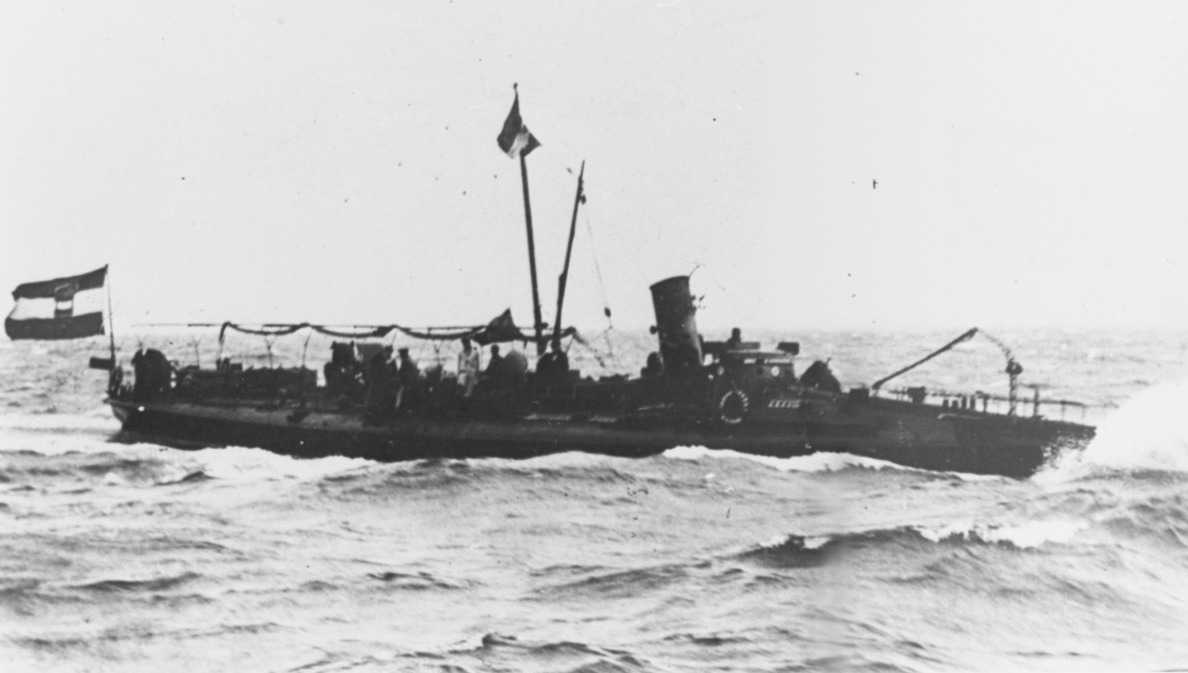
- Torpedo Boat No. 38 (ex-Kranich) underway

Class overview
- Builders: Seearsenal Pola; Schichau-Werke; Stabilimento Tecnico Triestino
- Operators: Austro-Hungarian Navy; Navy of the Kingdom of Serbs, Croats and Slovenes; Regia Marina
- Succeeded by: Cobra class
- Built: 1885–1891
- In commission: 1886–c.1944
- Completed: 22

General characteristics
- Type: Sea-going torpedo boat
- Displacement: 88–90 t (87–89 long tons) (full load)
- Length: 39.88 m (130 ft 10 in)
- Beam: 4.8 m (15 ft 9 in)
- Draught: 1.9 m (6 ft 3 in)
- Installed power: 1 × locomotive boiler; 950–1,000 ihp (710–750 kW)
- Propulsion: 1 × shaft; 1 × triple expansion engine
- Speed: 19 knots (35 km/h; 22 mph)
- Endurance: 1,200 nmi (2,200 km; 1,400 mi) at 10 knots (19 km/h; 12 mph)
- Complement: 16–18
- Armament: 2 × 37 mm (1.5 in) Hotchkiss guns; 2 × 356 mm (14 in) torpedo tubes

The Schichau class consisted of 22 torpedo boats built for the Austro-Hungarian Navy between 1885 and 1891. The class was one of the first torpedo boat classes built for the Austro-Hungarian Navy, and they were initially powered by steam from a single locomotive boiler and were armed with two 37 mm (1.5 in) Hotchkiss guns and two 356 mm (14 in) torpedo tubes. The entire class was reconstructed between 1900 and 1910, when they received two Yarrow boilers and a second funnel.

Ten of the class were converted into minesweepers between 1911 and 1913. One boat was discarded in 1911, with the rest seeing active service as part of local defence forces for the Adriatic naval bases during World War I, with one being lost in the early days of the war. The remaining ten torpedo boats were also converted to minesweepers in 1917, although five still carried torpedoes. After the war, sixteen of the boats were allocated to Italy and four were allocated to the navy of the newly created Kingdom of the Serbs, Croats and Slovenes (later Yugoslavia). Two were commissioned while the other two were used for spare parts. Except for one of the Yugoslav boats which was retained as a training vessel, all of the boats had been discarded by 1929. After capture during the April 1941 Axis invasion of Yugoslavia in World War II, the remaining boat saw service with the Italians and then the Germans. She was lost while in German hands sometime after September 1943.

== Background ==
During the 1880s, the Austro-Hungarian Navy became aligned with the French Jeune École (Young School) of naval strategy, which advocated, among other things, the use of small but powerfully-armed ships to defeat larger capital ships of an enemy. This strategy was to some extent driven by the budgetary difficulties the navy faced after the death of the reforming Marinekommandant (chief naval officer) Vizeadmiral Wilhelm von Tegetthoff. His successor, Vizeadmiral Friedrich von Pöck, had his requests for increased funding for new ironclads repeatedly rejected in the 1870s and early 1880s, and turned to less expensive means to defend Austria-Hungary's coastline.

One of the innovations that supported the Jeune École strategy was the development of the torpedo into an effective weapon. In 1868 the Austro-Hungarian Navy had been the first to arm its ships with the new weapon, which had been invented four years earlier by the Austro-Hungarian Navy officer Johann Luppis and manufactured by the Stabilimento Tecnico di Fiume naval engineering firm in Fiume led by Robert Whitehead. The vessel developed to deliver these weapons was the torpedo boat, a small and fast vessel intended to work in conjunction with cruisers. The Austro-Hungarian adoption of the Jeune École strategy, and the development of both high seas and coastal tactics for torpedo boats, went hand-in-hand with the construction of dozens of torpedo boats for the Austro-Hungarian Navy, which began under Pöck, and continued with the construction of the Schichau class under his successor, Vizeadmiral Maximilian Daublebsky von Sterneck.

== Design and construction ==
The Schichau-class boats were of a flush-deck design and had a raised bridge, with a short stepped foremast positioned just forward of the bridge. A raked mainmast was located amidships; it was fitted with a derrick for raising and lowering the lifeboat. The boats had a waterline length of 39.88 metres (130 ft 10 in), a beam of 4.8 m (15 ft 9 in), and a maximum draught of 1.9 m (6 ft 3 in). They had a standard displacement of 83 tonnes (82 long tons) and 88–90 tonnes (87–89 long tons) at full load. The crew consisted of 16 to 18 officers and enlisted men. All boats used a single triple-expansion engine driving one propeller shaft initially using steam generated by a locomotive boiler trunked through a single funnel positioned immediately behind the bridge. The boiler was replaced by two Yarrow boilers between 1900 and 1910, and a second funnel was installed. Their engine was rated at 950–1,000 indicated horsepower (710–750 kW) and they were designed to reach a top speed of 19 knots [kn] (35 km/h; 22 mph). They carried sufficient coal to give them a range of 1,200 nautical miles (2,200 km; 1,400 mi) at 10 kn (19 km/h; 12 mph).

They were armed with two Škoda license-built 37 mm (1.5 in) L/23 (Note: L/23 denotes the barrel's length as 23 times the diameter of the bore.) Hotchkiss guns, firing a 450-gram (16 oz) high explosive round to a maximum range of 3,000 m (9,800 ft). They were also equipped with two 356 mm (14 in) torpedo tubes, firing a Type C torpedo with a 45-kilogram (99 lb) warhead to a range of 600 m (2,000 ft) at 24 kn (44 km/h; 28 mph). The early batches of boats had both torpedo tubes bow-mounted in the hull, but the later batches had one bow-mounted tube with the second tube located in the stern. At the time they came into service, the boats were rated as first-class torpedo boats.

== Boats ==
A total of 22 boats were built by three shipbuilding companies; Seearsenal Pola and Stabilimento Tecnico Triestino in the Austro-Hungarian Empire, and Schichau-Werke in Germany. At the time they were built, boats of this class were initially given names, but they were redesignated with numbers on 1 April 1910. The class was succeeded by the Cobra class.

Construction of Schichau-class torpedo boats
Initial name	Builder	Laid down	Launched	Completed	Redesignated
Kibitz	Seearsenal Pola	1890	1891	1891	19
Kukuk	Schichau-Werke	1888	1889	1889	20
Staar	Schichau-Werke	1888	May 1889	1889	21
Krähe	Schichau-Werke	1888	1889	1889	22
Rabe	Schichau-Werke	1887	1888	1888	23
Elster	Schichau-Werke	1887	1888	1888	24
Gaukler	Stabilimento Tecnico Triestino	1889	1889	1890	25
Flamingo	Stabilimento Tecnico Triestino	1888	1889	1889	26
Secretär	Stabilimento Tecnico Triestino	1888	1889	1889	27
Weihe	Stabilimento Tecnico Triestino	Unknown	Unknown	Unknown	28
Marabou	Stabilimento Tecnico Triestino	1888	December 1889	December 1889	29
Harpie	Stabilimento Tecnico Triestino	1889	1890	1890	30
Sperber	Schichau-Werke	1885	1886	1886	31
Habicht	Schichau-Werke	1885	1886	1886	32
Bussard	Seearsenal Pola	1885	September 1886	1886	33
Condor	Seearsenal Pola	1885	September 1886	1886	34
Geier	Seearsenal Pola	1885	November 1886	1886	35
Uhu	Seearsenal Pola	1886	December 1886	1886	36
Würger	Seearsenal Pola	1886	1887	1887	37
Kranich	Seearsenal Pola	1886	1887	1887	38
Reiher	Seearsenal Pola	1886	1887	1887	39
Ibis	Seearsenal Pola	1886	1887	1887	40

== Service history ==
On 7 November 1893, Krähe (No. 22) collided with the torpedo cruiser SMS Lussin in the Hvar Channel between the islands of Brač and Hvar in the Adriatic Sea. After all boats of the class were reconstructed between 1900 and 1910, Nos. 27, 29, 30, 33–38 and 40 were converted into minesweepers between 1911 and 1913. Most of the boats converted to minesweepers no longer carried torpedoes but they did retain their guns. No. 28 was discarded by the navy in 1911, and transferred to the Austro-Hungarian Army, serving as Tender 28. At the outbreak of World War I the class was obsolete. In August 1914, the Schichau-class torpedo boats and minesweepers were split between the various local-defence forces for the main Austro-Hungarian ports on the Adriatic coast. Nos. 21, 24, 32 and 39 formed the 13th Torpedo Boat Group of the 7th Torpedo Division at Pola on the southern tip of the Istrian peninsula in the northern Adriatic, with Nos. 27, 30, 33, 34, 37 and 40 forming part of the Pola minesweeping flotilla. Nos. 20, 23 and 26 were stationed at Trieste – on the coast west of the Istrian peninsula – as part of the 15th and 16th Torpedo Boat Groups. Nos. 19, 22, 25 and 31 formed the 20th Torpedo Boat Group of the 10th Torpedo Division at Sebenico – on the central Dalmatian coast – alongside a minesweeping group that included Nos. 29 and 35. At Cattaro Bay (the modern-day Bay of Kotor) – on the southern Dalmatian coast – Nos. 36 and 38 were part of the minesweeping force.

On 23 August 1914, No. 26 struck a mine off Pola when she was pushed out of the safe route through the southern minefield by a strong gale. Her captain Linienschiffsleutnant Josef Konic and six of the crew were rescued, but one officer and ten crew members were lost. She later returned to service. The French submarine Cugnot slipped between the protective minefields outside Cattaro Bay and entered the bay on 29 November, but she was spotted by the Kaiman-class torpedo boat 57 T, which raised the alarm. The Huszár-class destroyer Ulan and the Blitz-class torpedo gunboat Blitz, along with No. 36, chased Cugnot, which was intending to attack the ironclad Kronprinz Erzherzog Rudolf. Cugnot struck an underwater obstacle and cancelled the attack, and 57 T fired a torpedo at her, but the torpedo missed because the depth was set too low. Cugnot then escaped from the bay and out through the minefield gap. On 20 December, the French submarine Curie posed a serious threat when she entered the harbour at Pola and became tangled in anti-submarine net cables. After four hours of fruitless attempts to free herself, she surfaced and was attacked by Nos. 24 and 39, the Kaiman-class torpedo boat 63 T, the Huszár-class destroyer Turul, the older Schichau-built destroyer Satellit, some smaller auxiliaries of the 1st Mine Command, and the "Cristo" coastal artillery battery. Curie was sunk by gunfire, but only one crew member was killed and another died of his wounds. Curie was later raised and re-commissioned as SM U-14.

No. 22 ran aground and sank off Sebenico on 3 March 1916, but was salvaged and repaired later that year. All of the remaining torpedo boats were converted to minesweepers during 1917. The boats of the class all retained their torpedo tubes, but only Nos. 19 and 21–24 still carried torpedoes. On 16 November 1917, Nos. 23, 27 and 30 were part of a minesweeping force that supported the bombardment of a 152 mm (6 in) Italian shore battery at Cortellazzo near the mouth of the Piave near Venice, supported by three seaplanes. None of the torpedo boats suffered any damage. After an Italian force of three MAS boats appeared, covered by seven destroyers and three submarines, the bombarding force withdrew. On 19 December, a large Austro-Hungarian force again engaged the Italian shore battery at Cortellazzo. The force was supported by Nos. 20, 23, 27, 30, 32 and 34. None of the ships of the bombarding force suffered damage during the mission. On 5 April 1918, the Huszár-class destroyer Uskoke and No. 26 put a landing party ashore at Ancona – on the central Italian coast – but the party was captured. On 5 September, Nos. 19 and 38 were supporting another torpedo boat in the Gulf of Drin – off the Albanian coast – when they encountered an Italian force. The Austro-Hungarian boats broke off contact and escaped.

Twenty boats survived the war. Under the Treaty of Saint-Germain-en-Laye, sixteen were allocated to Italy, and she made use of five as customs vessels but scrapped the rest. The customs vessels had also been scrapped by 1925. The remaining four vessels were allocated to the new Kingdom of Serbs, Croats and Slovenes (later renamed Yugoslavia). The Yugoslavs retained Nos. 21, 36, 38 and 19 as the minesweepers D1 to D4, respectively. In Yugoslav service the guns were removed and they were armed with two machine guns. Only D1 and D2 were commissioned, with D3 and D4 laid up at the Tivat Arsenal in the Bay of Kotor and used as a source of spare parts for the two commissioned boats. The latter two were discarded in 1925 and 1927 respectively. D1 was used as a guardship and minesweeper at Kumbor and elsewhere in the Bay of Kotor until she was stricken on 5 June 1929. D2 was initially retained as a minesweeper based out of the Bay of Kotor, then employed as the training vessel for the Naval Academy at Gruž, the main port of Dubrovnik – on the far southern coast of Yugoslavia – between 1924 and 1941. While in this role, she retained only a skeleton regular navy crew, as the rest of the positions were made up with trainees. Many former Yugoslav Royal Navy personnel fondly remembered their time training aboard D2.

When the Axis invasion of Yugoslavia commenced in April 1941 as part of World War II, D2 was under the command of Kapetan Korvete Franc Podboj. The boat sailed from Gruž to the Bay of Kotor during the invasion, and was captured there by the Italians. She served in the Italian Royal Navy as D10. The boat was captured by the German Navy on 11 September 1943 in the Bay of Kotor at the time of the Italian capitulation. At the time she was of no operational value. The final boat of the class was lost in their hands off Kumbor sometime thereafter, or scuttled by them in the Bay of Kotor as they withdrew. (Note: Frampton, Mancini, et al. say that her final fate is unknown.)
