= SMS Wespe =

There were two ships in the Prussian Navy and later German Imperial Navy named SMS Wespe:

- SMS Wespe (1860) - a Jäger-class gunboat launched in 1860
- SMS Wespe (1876) - a Wespe-class armored gunboat launched in 1876
