= SM U-36 (Austria-Hungary) =

SM U-36 was the number given to two German U-boats SM U-21 and SM U-47, when operating under the flag of Austria-Hungary in the Mediterranean Sea during World War I.
