= SMS Kronprinz Erzherzog Rudolf =

Ironclad warship of the Austro-Hungarian Navy

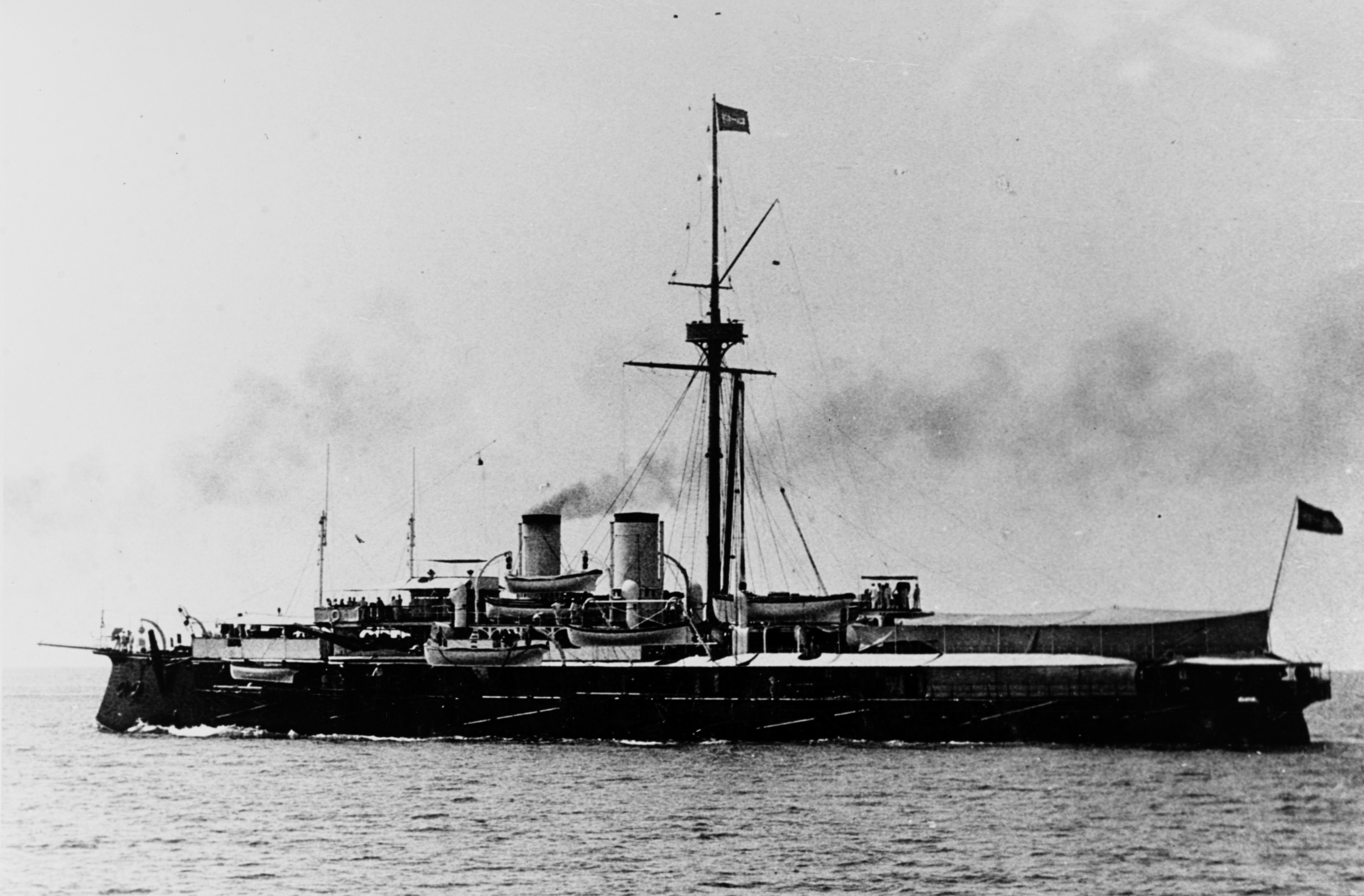
- Kronprinz Erzherzog Rudolf

Class overview
- Preceded by: Tegetthoff
- Succeeded by: Kronprinzessin Erzherzogin Stephanie

History

Austro-Hungarian Empire
- Name: Kronprinz Erzherzog Rudolf
- Namesake: Rudolf, Crown Prince of Austria
- Builder: Pola Navy Yard
- Laid down: 25 January 1884
- Launched: 6 July 1887
- Commissioned: 20 September 1889
- Fate: Transferred to Navy of the Kingdom of Serbs, Croats and Slovenes, 1921

History

Kingdom of Serbs, Croats and Slovenes
- Namesake: Kumbor
- Acquired: 1921
- Renamed: Kumbor
- Stricken: 1922
- Fate: Broken up for scrap, 1922

General characteristics
- Type: Barbette ship
- Displacement: 6,829 long tons (6,939 t)
- Length: 97.6 m (320 ft 3 in) o/a
- Beam: 19.27 m (63 ft 3 in)
- Draft: 7.39 m (24 ft 3 in)
- Installed power: 10 × fire-tube boilers; 6,000 ihp (4,500 kW)
- Propulsion: 2 × triple-expansion steam engines; 2 × screw propellers
- Speed: 15.5 kn (28.7 km/h; 17.8 mph)
- Crew: 447–450
- Armament: 3 × 30.5 cm MRK L/35 (12 in) guns; 6 × 12 cm (4.7 in) guns; 7 × 47 mm (1.9 in) QF guns; 2 × 37 mm (1.5 in) QF guns; 4 × 40 cm (15.7 in) torpedo tubes
- Armor: Belt: 305 mm; Deck: 95 mm (3.7 in); Barbettes: 254 mm (10 in)

SMS Kronprinz Erzherzog Rudolf ("Crown Prince Archduke Rudolf") was a unique ironclad warship built for the Austro-Hungarian Navy in the 1880s, the fleet's last vessel of that type. The ship was laid down in January 1884, launched in July 1887, and completed in September 1889. She was armed with a main battery of three 30.5-centimeter (12 in) guns and had compound steel plating of the same thickness on her armored belt. The ship had an uneventful career, in large part due to her rapid obsolescence. She made trips to foreign countries to represent Austria-Hungary, but was reduced to a coastal defense ship by 1906. She continued in this role through World War I, based at Cattaro Bay, where her crew took part in the Cattaro Mutiny in early 1918. After the war, Kronprinz Erzherzog Rudolf was transferred to the Navy of the Kingdom of Serbs, Croats and Slovenes, renamed Kumbor and classed as a coastal defence ship, but she remained in their inventory for only a year, being sold for scrap in 1922.

== Design ==
Line drawing of Kronprinz Erzherzog Rudolf

In the decades that followed the Austrian victory at the Battle of Lissa in 1866, naval expenditure in the Austro-Hungarian Empire were drastically reduced, in large part due to the veto power the Hungarian half of the empire held. Surrounded by potentially hostile countries powers on land, the Austro-Hungarian Empire was more concerned with these threats, and so naval development was not prioritized. Admiral Friedrich von Pöck argued for several years to improve the strength of the Austro-Hungarian fleet, finally winning authorization to build the center battery ship Tegetthoff in 1875. He spent another six years trying in vain to secure a sister ship to Tegetthoff.

Finally, in 1881, Pöck succeeded in securing funding for a new ironclad, authorized as "Ersatz Salamander", a replacement for the earlier ironclad frigate. The new ship, to be named Kronprinz Erzherzog Rudolf, cost 5.44 million florins. According to Conway's All the World's Fighting Ships, the design for the new ship was prepared by Josef Kuchinka, the Director of Naval Construction for the Austro-Hungarian Navy, but the naval historian R. F. Scheltema de Heere credits the naval engineer Moriz Soyka with the work. A second ship, Kronprinzessin Erzherzogin Stephanie, was authorized at the same time. The designs for both vessels were heavily influenced by foreign ships like the French ironclads Duguesclin and Amiral Duperré, both of which featured a similar arrangement of the main battery guns that Kuchinka used for his new ships.

Chronically starved of funding, the navy was forced to accept significant compromises in the size—and therefore capabilities—of Kronprinz Erzherzog Rudolf and Kronprinzessin Erzherzogin Stephanie, particularly compared to the far larger and more heavily armed Amiral Duperré that inspired their design. Scheltema de Heere severely criticized the decision to build two ships of markedly different size and power at the same time, stating "Either you need three guns or you can do with two, but one unit larger than the other is nonsense." Nearly another decade would pass before the Austro-Hungarian Navy secured funding for new capital ships, the three Monarch-class coastal defense ships begun in 1893.

=== General characteristics and machinery ===
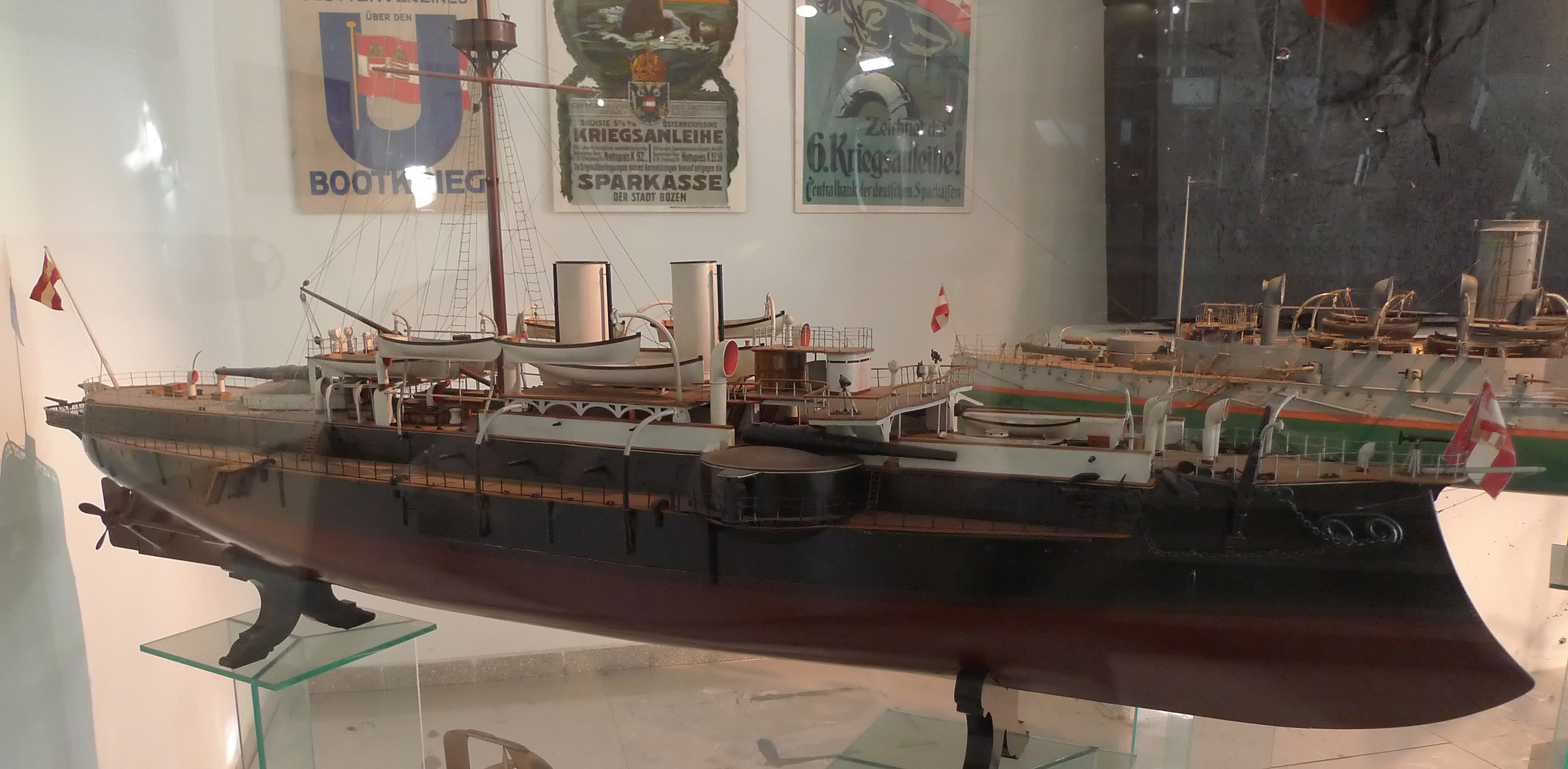
Model of Kronprinz Erzherzog Rudolf

Kronprinz Erzherzog Rudolf was 90.26 meters (296 ft 2 in) long between perpendiculars and 97.6 m (320 ft 3 in) long overall. She had a beam of 19.27 m (63 ft 3 in) and a draft of 7.39 m (24 ft 3 in), and she displaced 6,829 long tons (6,939 t) normally and 7,315.10 long tons (7,432.48 t) at full load. Her hull was constructed with transverse and longitudinal steel frames, over which the outer steel hull plating was riveted; it was also extensively sub-divided into watertight compartments and had a double bottom. She had a pronounced ram bow, a common feature of capital ships of the period. The ship had a flush deck and was fitted with a large forward conning tower with a bridge mounted atop it along with a smaller secondary conning tower further aft.

Kronprinz Erzherzog Rudolf was fitted with a single pole mast with a large fighting top placed amidships. The ship had a transverse metacentric height of 2.24 m (7 ft 4 in) at full load. Steering was controlled with a single rudder. She was fitted with electrical pumps that had a capacity of 2,000 long tons (2,032 t) of water per hour. Her crew varied between 447 and 450 officers and enlisted men throughout her career.

Stabilimento Tecnico Triestino manufactured Kronprinz Erzherzog Rudolf's propulsion system. The ship was powered by a pair of two-cylinder, vertical triple-expansion steam engines, driving a pair of four-bladed screw propellers that were 5.49 m (18 ft) in diameter. Steam for the engines was provided by ten coal-fired fire-tube boilers, each of which had three fireboxes. The boilers were vented through two funnels. Her propulsion system was rated to provide 6,000 indicated horsepower (4,500 kW) for a top speed of 15.5 knots (28.7 km/h; 17.8 mph). With forced draft, the power could be increased to 7,500 ihp (5,600 kW), though the increase in speed was modest, to 16 knots (30 km/h; 18 mph). The ship was fitted with four electrical generators to power internal lighting and searchlights.

=== Armament and armor ===
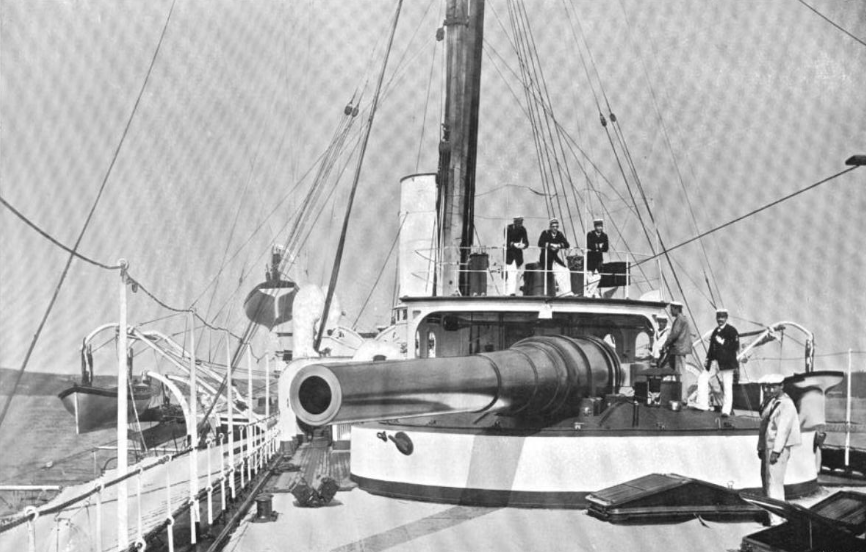
Kronprinz Erzherzog Rudolf's aft barbette gun

Kronprinz Erzherzog Rudolf was armed with a main battery of three 30.5-centimeter (12 in) MRK 35-caliber guns mounted singly in open barbettes. Two were placed forward in sponsons over the battery deck to maximize end-on fire, with the third placed aft. The guns were manufactured by Krupp, while the carriages that carried them were built by Armstrong Mitchell & Co. Each of the forward guns had an arc of 180 degrees, while the stern gun could traverse 270 degrees, all hydraulically operated. The guns fired a 450-kilogram (990 lb) shell using a 140 kg (310 lb) charge of brown powder, which produced a muzzle velocity of 530 meters per second (1,700 ft/s). While the open barbettes provided a wide field of fire for the slow-firing guns, they were rapidly rendered obsolete by the successful application of quick-firing (QF) technology to large-caliber artillery pieces. The guns were supplied with forty shells apiece.

The main battery was supported by a secondary battery of six 12 cm (4.7 in) 35-caliber guns, also built by Krupp. These guns fired a 26 kg (57 lb) shell with a 15 kg (33 lb) propellant charge, and the ship carried a total of 256 of the shells. She carried seven 47 mm (1.9 in) QF guns for close-range defense against torpedo boats; five were 44-caliber guns and the other two were shorter 33-caliber pieces, all built by Hotchkiss. She carried a total of 1770 rounds of ammunition for the guns. Her gun armament was rounded out by a pair of 37 mm (1.5 in) 44-caliber QF guns and a pair of 7 cm (2.8 in) 15-caliber landing guns for use by landing parties. The 37 mm guns were supplied with a total of 780 rounds. As was customary for capital ships of the period, she carried four 40 cm (15.7 in) torpedo tubes; one was mounted in the bow, another in the stern, and one on each broadside. The ship carried fourteen torpedoes.

Kronprinz Erzherzog Rudolf was protected with compound armor manufactured by the Dillinger Hütte works in Germany. The ship's armored belt was 305 mm thick amidships, where it protected the ammunition magazines and machinery spaces, and reduced to 62 mm (2.4 in) elsewhere. Transverse bulkheads capped the ends of the thickest portion of the belt, with the forward bulkhead 242 mm (9.5 in) and the aft bulkhead 203 mm (8 in) thick. An armored deck 95 mm (3.7 in) thick protected the ship's vitals from shells that passed over the side armor. The barbettes for the main battery were 254 mm (10 in) thick.

== Service history ==
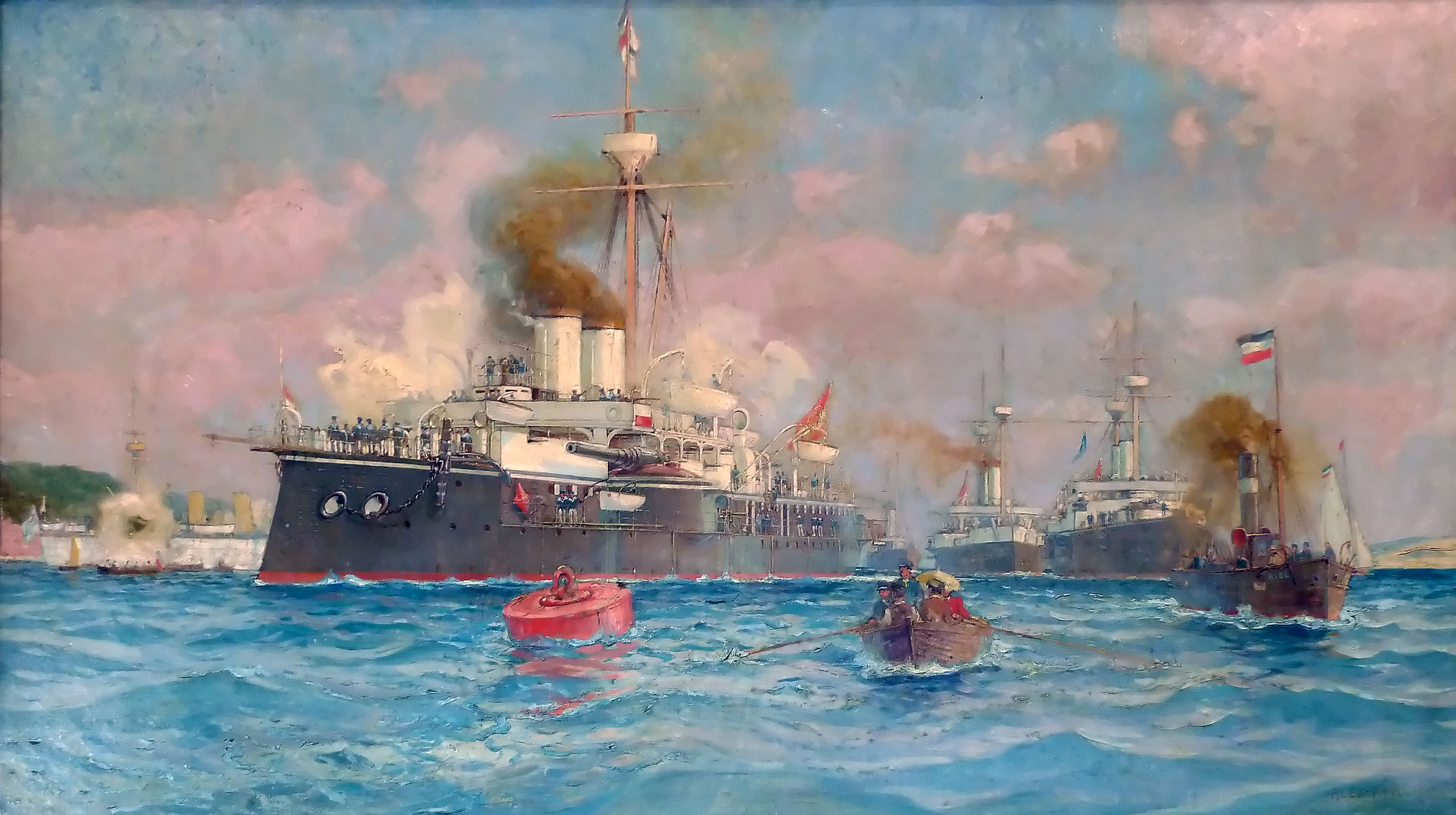
Painting of an Austro-Hungarian squadron, led by Kronprinz Erzherzog Rudolf, in Kiel, Germany

SMS Kronprinz Erzherzog Rudolf was laid down on 25 January 1884 at the Navy Dockyard in Pola. She was launched on 6 July 1887 and then began fitting out, which was completed in September 1889. The ship was commissioned to begin sea trials on 20 September. Embarrassingly for the Habsburgs, the ship's namesake had committed suicide earlier that year in the Mayerling incident. In 1890, the German emperor, Kaiser Wilhelm II, invited the Austro-Hungarian fleet to take part in the annual fleet training exercises in August. Kronprinz Erzherzog Rudolf, the ironclad Kronprinzessin Erzherzogin Stephanie, and the protected cruiser Kaiser Franz Joseph I were sent to Germany under the command of Rear Admiral Johann von Hinke. While en route, the squadron made visits in Gibraltar and Britain; during the latter stop, the ships took part in the Cowes Regatta, where they were reviewed by Queen Victoria. The ships also stopped in Copenhagen, Denmark and Karlskrona, Sweden. During the voyage back to Austria-Hungary, the squadron visited Cherbourg, France and Palermo, Italy. Kronprinz Erzherzog Rudolf experienced repeated difficulties with her engines on the trip, but it was nevertheless considered to be a great success in the Austro-Hungarian Navy.

In 1892, celebrations to honor the 400th anniversary of Christopher Columbus's first trans-Atlantic voyage were held in several countries; Kronprinz Erzherzog Rudolf, Kronprinzessin Erzherzogin Stephanie, and Kaiser Franz Joseph I represented Austria-Hungary during the ceremonies in Genoa, Italy, Columbus's birthplace. While there, she was inspected by King Umberto I and his son Prince Victor Emmanuel. Already by 1898, the ship was regarded by the Austro-Hungarian Navy as a second-rate vessel, after less than 10 years in service. The rapid pace of naval development in the late 19th century had quickly rendered her obsolescent. Kronprinz Erzherzog Rudolf was reclassified as a coastal defense ship in 1906. In 1908, the Austro-Hungarian Navy attempted to sell the ship, Kronprinzessin Erzherzogin Stephanie, and Tegetthoff to Uruguay to raise funds for new projects, but the deal fell through.

=== World War I ===
Kronprinz Erzherzog Rudolf c. 1915 as a station ship in Cattaro Bay

After Austria-Hungary declared war on Serbia in July 1914, beginning World War I, the ship was stationed in Cattaro Bay under Commander Richard Florio, the leader of Mining Command II. The force also included an old destroyer, four torpedo boats, a minelayer, and two minesweepers, among other minor vessels. She remained there for the duration of the conflict. On 29 November, the French submarine Cugnot slipped between the protective minefields outside Cattaro Bay and entered the bay, but she was spotted by the Kaiman-class torpedo boat 57 T, which raised the alarm. The Huszár-class destroyer Ulan and the Blitz-class torpedo gunboat Blitz, along with the Schichau-class torpedo boat 36, chased Cugnot, which was intending to attack Kronprinz Erzherzog Rudolf. Cugnot struck an underwater obstacle and cancelled the attack, and 57 T fired a torpedo at her, but the torpedo missed because the depth was set too low. Cugnot then escaped from the bay and out through the minefield gap.

By early 1918, the long periods of inactivity had begun to wear on the crews of several warships at Cattaro, including Kronprinz Erzherzog Rudolf. On 1 February, the Cattaro Mutiny broke out, starting aboard the armored cruiser Sankt Georg and quickly spreading to other ships. Officers were confined to their quarters while a committee of sailors met to formulate a list of demands, which ranged from longer periods of leave and better rations to an end to the war, based on the United States President Woodrow Wilson's Fourteen Points. The following day, shore batteries loyal to the government fired on Kronprinz Erzherzog Rudolf as she steamed to the Bay of Teodo, the outermost part of Cattaro Bay. The batteries scored a single hit that killed two men, which prompted many of the mutinous ships to abandon the effort. On the morning of 3 February, the Erzherzog Karl-class battleships of the III Division arrived in Cattaro, which convinced the last holdouts to surrender. Trials on the ringleaders commenced quickly and four men were executed.

With the end of the war in November 1918 and the dissolution of the Austro-Hungarian Empire, Kronprinz Erzherzog Rudolf was transferred to the fledgling Navy of the Kingdom of Serbs, Croats and Slovenes in March 1921. They renamed her Kumbor (for Kumbor, a port of Montenegro) and classed her as a coastal defence ship, but she remained in their inventory only briefly, being broken up for scrap the following year.
