= SMS Leitha =

Museum ship moored on the Danube in Budapest

Coordinates: 47.508707°N 19.044776°E

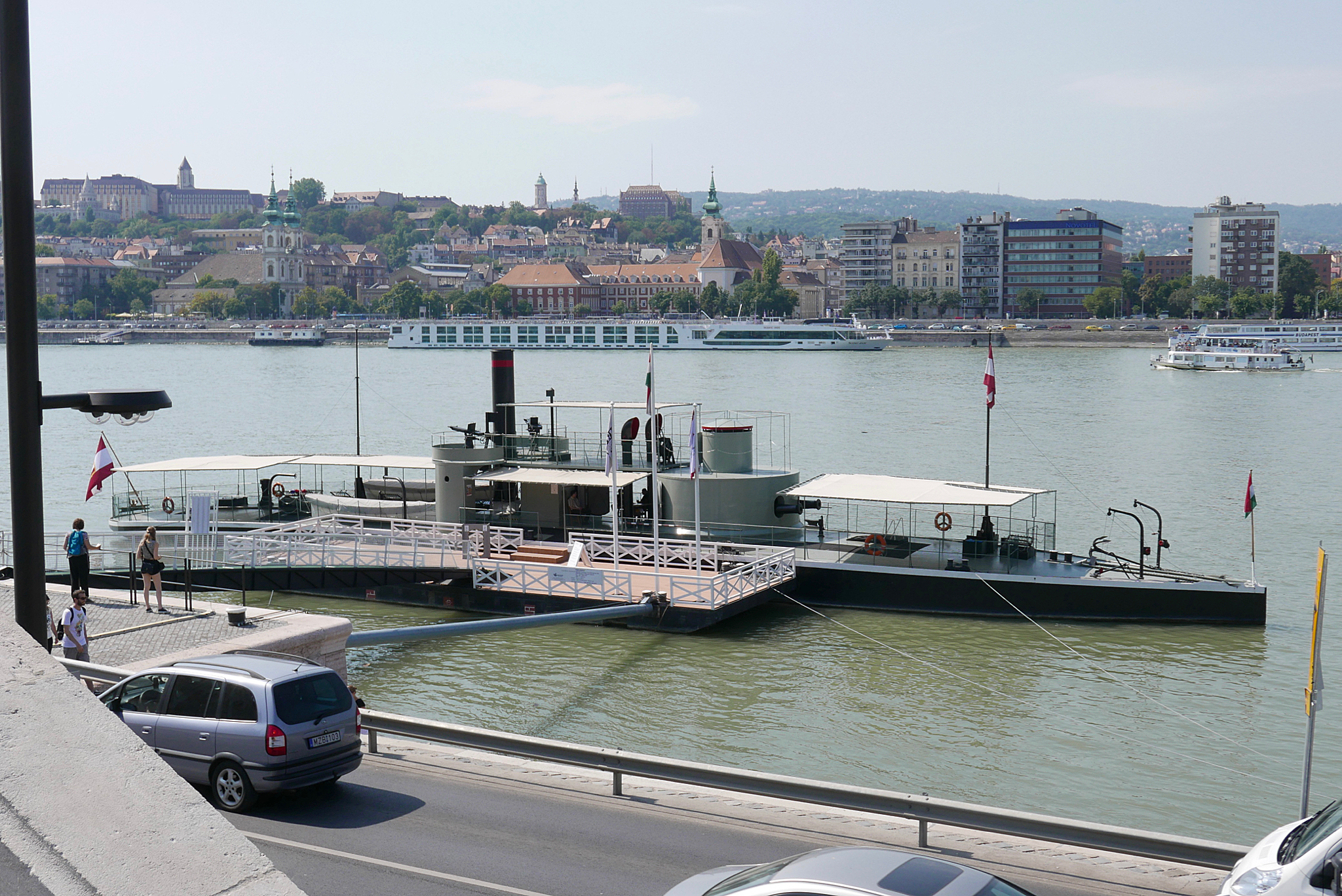
- Leitha after restoration work

History

Austria-Hungary
- Name: SMS Leitha
- Namesake: The warship was named after the Austrian river, Leitha (in Hungarian "Lajta")
- Builder: Újpesti Shipyard, Óbudai Shipyard, Budapest
- Cost: about 425,000 florins
- Laid down: 17 May 1871
- Launched: 13 October 1872
- Status: Museum ship

General characteristics
- Class & type: Leitha-class river monitor
- Length: 50.5 m (165 ft 8 in)
- Beam: 8.65 m (28 ft 5 in)
- Draught: 1.3 m (4 ft 3 in)
- Installed power: 700 ihp (520 kW)
- Propulsion: 2 screws; 2 double-expansion steam engines
- Speed: 8.3 knots (15.4 km/h; 9.6 mph)
- Armament: As built: 2 × single 15 cm (5.9 in) cannon; 2 × 4-barreled 19 mm (0.7 in) Nordenfelt guns; After 1892: 1 × single 120 mm (4.7 in) gun; 2 × single 47 mm (1.9 in) revolver cannon; 1 × single 8 mm (0.3 in) machine gun; 1915: 1 × single 120 mm gun; 2 × single 66 mm (2.6 in) guns; 2 × 5-barreled 37 mm (1.5 in) revolver cannon; 2 × single 8 mm Schwarzlose machine guns

SMS Leitha or Lajta Monitor Museumship was the first river monitor in Europe and the oldest and also the only remaining, fully restored warship of the Austro-Hungarian Navy. Currently it is moored on the Danube in Budapest near the Hungarian Parliament Building as a museum ship.

The monitor was an innovation in the history of warship construction. The first European river monitors were constructed by the Austro-Hungarian Monarchy, namely the SMS Leitha and SMS Maros, and since then the river warships of the Monarchy were built in pairs. According to the customs of that time, river warships were named after the rivers of the Austro-Hungarian Empire. The names were chosen to reflect the dual (Imperial and Royal, Austrian and Hungarian) nature of the monarchy; thus, one of the ships received an Austrian name, the other one a Hungarian. This is the reason why this warship was named after the Austrian river Leitha (in Hungarian "Lajta"), while her sister ship was named after a Hungarian river, the Maros.

The construction of the first Danube monitors was dictated by the Monarchy's foreign policy ambitions, and the military and economic situation of the times. The ambition of becoming a great continental power turned the attention of the Austro-Hungarian Monarchy in the direction of the Balkans as it could not expand towards the West. However, the Monarchy had to be prepared to compensate the states along the Danube, which had been newly liberated from Turkish rule, and that of Tsarist Russia. To gain more influence in the Balkans therefore the commander of the Monarchy's naval fleet, admiral Wilhelm von Tegetthoff suggested the construction of monitor type warships. Finances were raised, the necessary funds having been voted from the budget of 1869. The cost of the Leitha amounted to 425,000 florins.

== Construction ==
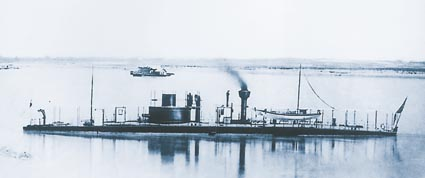
SMS Leitha in 1872

The construction of the two monitors began in 1870 at a Hungarian shipyard, with some parts, including the turret, arriving from England. The monitors were launched one year later in 1871, SMS Leitha on 17 May, and SMS Maros on 20 April. The designer of the first pair of monitors was Josef von Romako, who designed many other seagoing warships for the Empire. He had to take into consideration the fact that because of the low average depth of the Hungarian rivers, he could only build shallow-draft ships, which made his task very difficult, given that warships are very heavy due to their armour and weaponry. Romako solved the weight problem with a curved hull and lighter armour plates. With a low-freeboard, the ship needed less armour, ending up with a draft of just 1.3 m.

== History ==
=== History of the monitors ===
The first monitor was built in the American Civil War, which was between the Northern Union and Southern Confederate states. The Northern states introduced an innovation in military technology, USS Monitor, designed by the Swede John Ericsson. USS Monitor clashed with the Southern CSS Virginia – thought to be unsinkable – in March 1862, in which battle the former ship was victorious in that Virginia had to withdraw from the battle. The new military technology solution began to spread all over the world. The career of the monitors started in 1862 and lasted up until 1965. During this period almost 200 examples of them served in 25 countries, with displacements ranging from 250 tons to 8,000 tons. Three main types were developed: ocean-going, coastal, and river monitors.

=== 1878–1892 refit ===
Leitha first saw action in 1878 in the occupation of Bosnia, when the Dual Monarchy invaded Bosnia-Herzegovina, which had been under Ottoman Turkish rule until that time. The ship actively participated in battles on the Sava river.

After that, she performed routine duties on the Danube and tributaries until 1892, when the Austro-Hungarian Navy decided to build two new, modern monitors, to be named Körös and Szamos. At the same time, it was decided to modernise Leitha and Maros. The superstructure was enlarged, and the turret was replaced by a single modern 120 mm L/33 gun in a smaller armored mounting. Also, a modern secondary armament, consisting of a pair of Škoda 47 mm L/40 SFK L/44 guns and an 8 mm Salvator-Dormus machine gun, was installed.

=== World War I ===
At the outbreak of the war, Leitha was about to be demobilized. However it was decided to deploy Leitha, together with her sister ship, Maros, again. By then they were the oldest fighting warships in the Austro-Hungarian Navy. In 1914 (11 August – 1 December) Leitha was in action again on the Sava. The first Hungarian war hero of the Austro-Hungarian Navy, sailor János Huj, serving aboard Leitha, was killed in these battles (12 August). The ship's greatest damage occurred in October 1914, during the first occupation of Belgrade, when the turret suffered a direct hit, all the crew inside being killed. Following this serious damage, she was withdrawn for repairs. In 1915 she received one Škoda 66 mm (2.6 in) SFK L/42 gun, an L/18 model of the same weapon above it, a pair of 37 mm Hotchkiss revolver cannon, and a pair of 8 mm Schwarzlose machine guns, as a replacement for the 47 mm guns installed in 1892. Afterwards, she became the flagship of the Danube flotilla participating in the second occupation of Belgrade. She was in action against the Romanian troops crossing the Danube, and also supported the Central Powers crossing of the Danube at Svishtov.

=== 1919 ===
After the Austro-Hungarian Empire had lost World War I, its naval fleet had to be demobilized. Yet, the short-term Soviet Republic in Hungary in 1919, urged the reinstatement of the Danube fleet, therefore the vessel, by that time renamed Lajta was deployed once more. In this period, she fought against the Czech interventionist troops between Komárom and Esztergom. In the same year in June, Lajta and her sister ship, Maros took an active part in the so-called "monitor-revolt", named after these monitors taking part in it, which was one of the first anti-communist rebellions in the world. A military takeover was to be organized in Budapest as a demonstration against the current communist dictatorship, and a very important part would have been naval support from the Danube. When the monitors appeared on the river, they hoisted the red-white-green national flag, instead of the Soviet red one. People welcomed them, but the revolt was soon suppressed by Hungarian communist forces. During the "monitor-revolt", Captain László Csicsery died on board Lajta.

=== Elevator ship ===
In 1921, under the control of the Entente Powers who did not need her due to her old age, the armament, armour and the machinery of Lajta was removed, and she was sold at auction. An enterprise from Budapest bought the monitor in 1928, converted her to an elevator ship (which can convey the mined gravel to the river bank from barges), by constructing a conveyor belt and associated machinery on board. From that moment, Lajta served as a civilian ship, under the name of "József Lajos elevator ship". After the Hungarian Communist Party came to power in 1949, the company was nationalized as the FOKA gravel mining company, and the ship continued working as an elevator ship until 1992, now under the name of FK-201. In 1992 the FOKA enterprise was sold, including Lajta, to a Swiss company.

=== Museum ship ===
The Hungarian naval historian Károly Csonkaréti discovered the historic ship at the end of the 1970s. An Austrian engineer, Friedrich Prasky, identified her, and András Margitay-Becht helped to get her back from the Swiss company, and later on he worked to establish the history of the ship scientifically. Their efforts resulted in Lajta being declared a protected industrial and military historic monument. The Museum and Institution of Military History became her formal owner. Lajta had to wait for her restoration in a shipyard until 2005, when conservation works were carried out on her. This was possible due to an agreement between the Ministry of Defense and the Zoltán Gőzös Foundation, which took over the management of Lajta. The foundation is dedicated to preserve and restore museum ships and to exhibit these vessels at the Open Air Ship Museum of Neszmély. The Zoltán Gőzös Foundation in co-operation with the Hungarian Society of Maritime History, Modelling and Tradition (whose volunteers spent more than 2000 hours working on the outfitting and the installation of the equipment and the exhibition on board) restored the ship in 2009 and on 20 August 2010 inaugurated the Lajta Monitor Museum Ship. The ribbon-cutting ceremony was performed by the defence minister's wife, Szilvia Hendéné Stiber. The minister, Csaba Hende, declared Lajta the honorary flagship of the Hungarian Army's river warship regiment.

The SMS Leitha is currently not moored in front of the Hungarian Parliament Building, it is rumored that she has been moved to one of the nearby Hungarian Military Ports for restoration, and there is no timeline for when she will return. She is currently not open for public display.

== Gun turret ==
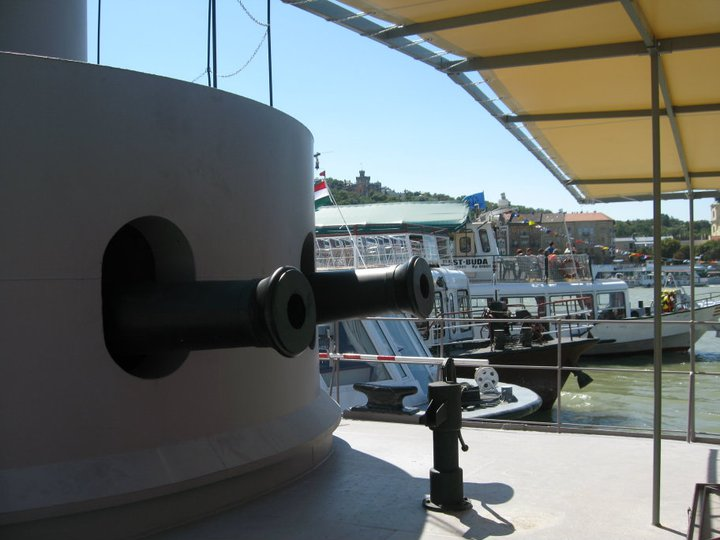
Wahrendorf-type cannon

The first rotating gun turret was adopted on the USS Monitor. This was a pioneering innovation, because formerly warships used rows of cannons on each broadside. Therefore, they could only fire when already turned into the required direction, parallel to the enemy's ship. But with the help of the rotating gun turret, it was not necessary to wait until the required position was reached, so ships could fire in any direction. The designer of the rotating gun turret in the Leitha was the British Captain Cowper Phipps Coles.

=== The ammunition magazine under the gun turret ===
The shells, and the charges, in silk bags, for the main guns, were stored here, as was the ammunition for the other guns of the ship. These were passed through openings in the deck, leading up into the gun turret. Seamen in this room could rotate the turret above them initially using hand winches. Later on, the gun turret was driven by an auxiliary steam engine. Altogether 9–10 people worked in here.

=== In the gun turret ===
Inside the gun turret two 15 cm breech loading Wahrendorf guns can be found. These could provide significant firepower, enhanced by the rotation of the turret. Ammunition was passed up from the magazine below through openings besides each of the guns. Altogether 16 gunners worked together in this confined space. During battles, one round could be fired by each of the guns about every 4–6 minutes, because the reloading was a relatively long procedure.

=== Other armament ===
The upper deck was extended in 1887, and two Nordenfelt guns can be seen on the after part of this deck. These guns are multiple barrel machine guns with four barrels each. The weight of each gun is 300 kg; the magazine could hold 32 rounds, 8 for each barrel. The entire magazine could be fired in about 20 seconds.

== Stern ==
On the ship's stern the original version of the Lajta’s name (Leitha) can be seen, and the crown of the Habsburg coat of arms. The flag of the Austro-Hungarian Monarchy can also be found here, which was used on all vessels of the Empire, both warships and merchant ships, after the order of Joseph II of 1786 which came into force on 1 January 1787. After the Austro-Hungarian Compromise of 1867, merchant sea ships of the Dual Monarchy wore a different ensign: a combination of the Austrian and Hungarian colours, with their respective coats of arms.

== Images ==
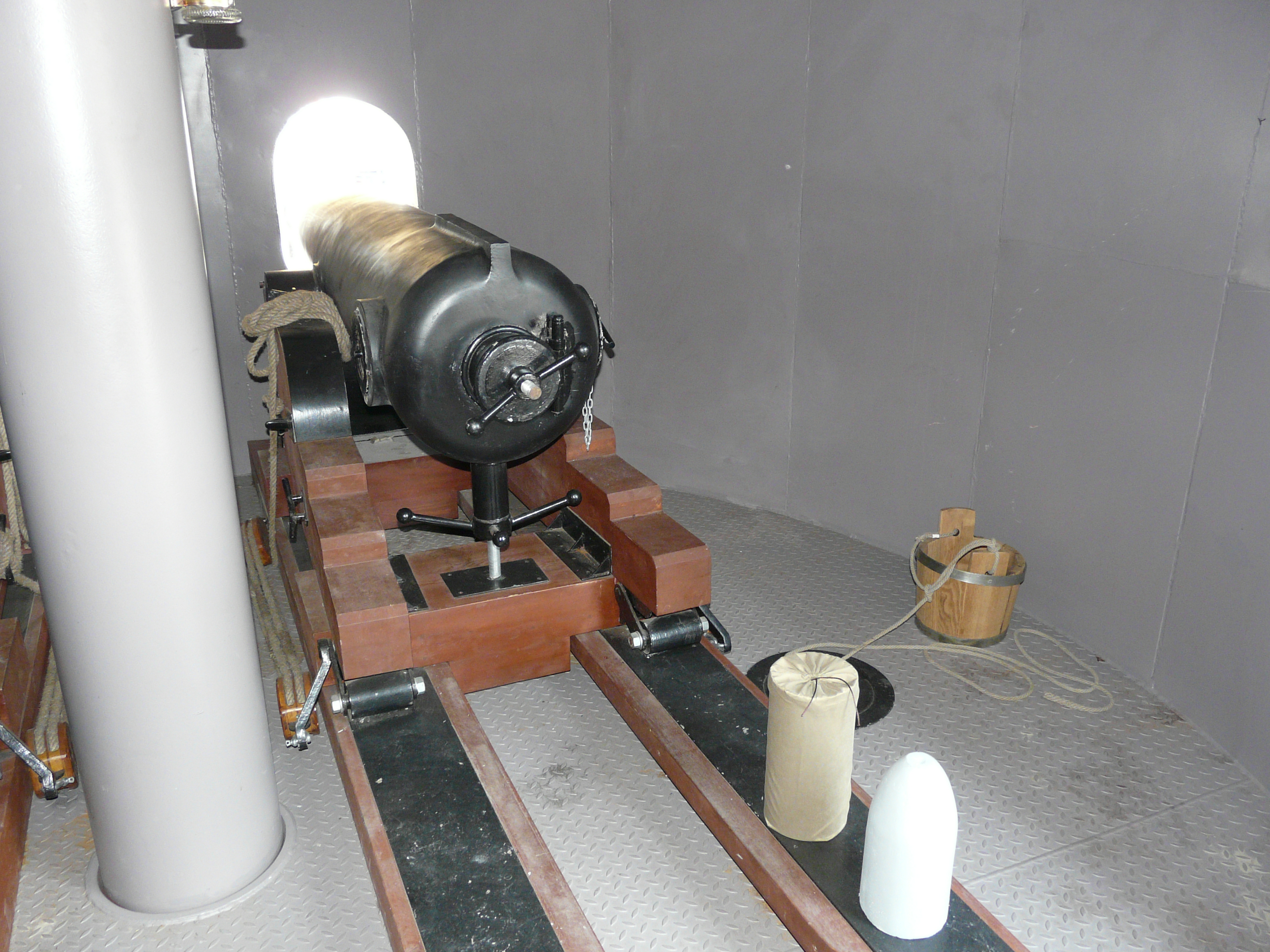
Wahrendorf-type cannons

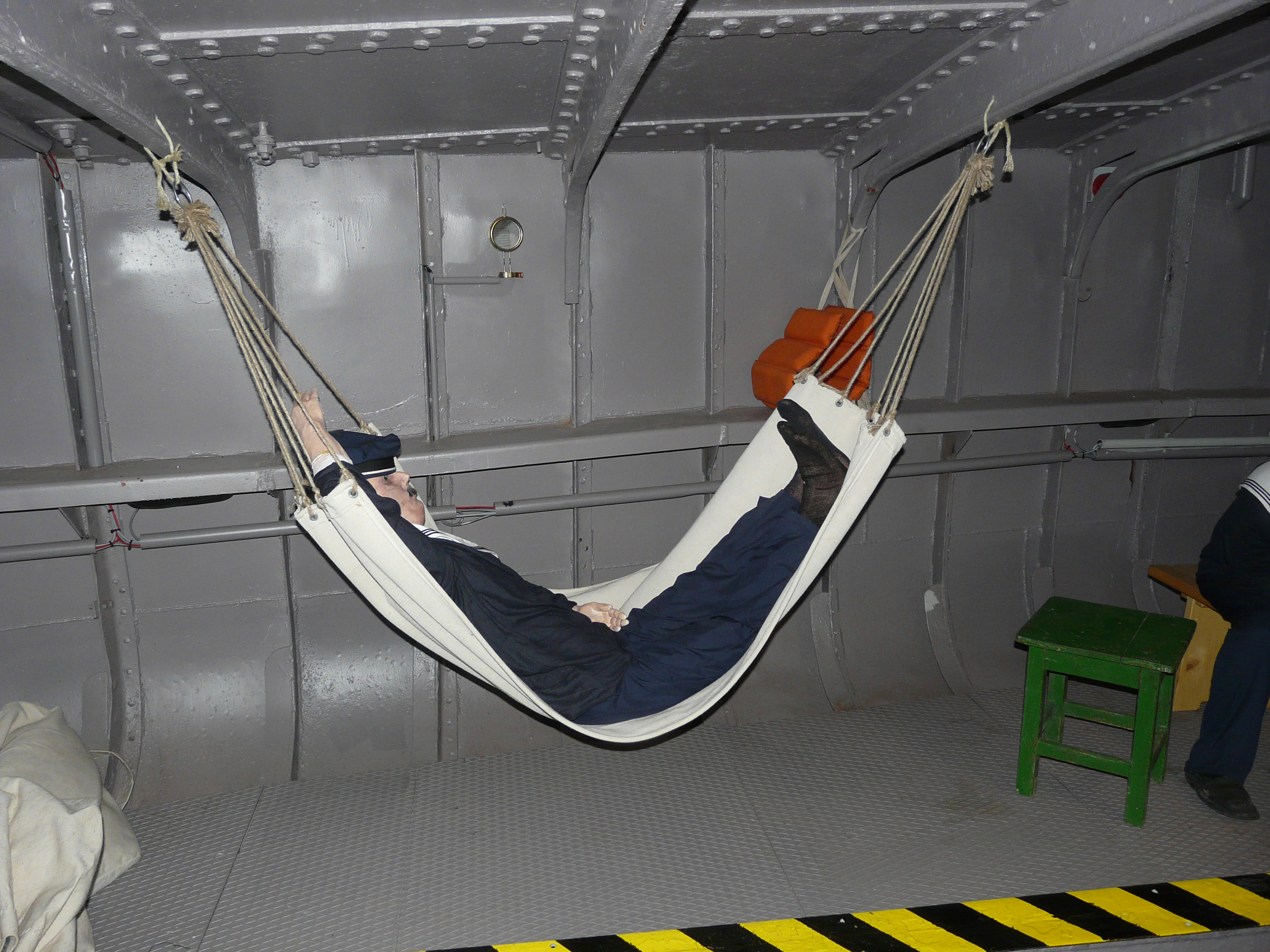
Sailor's hammock

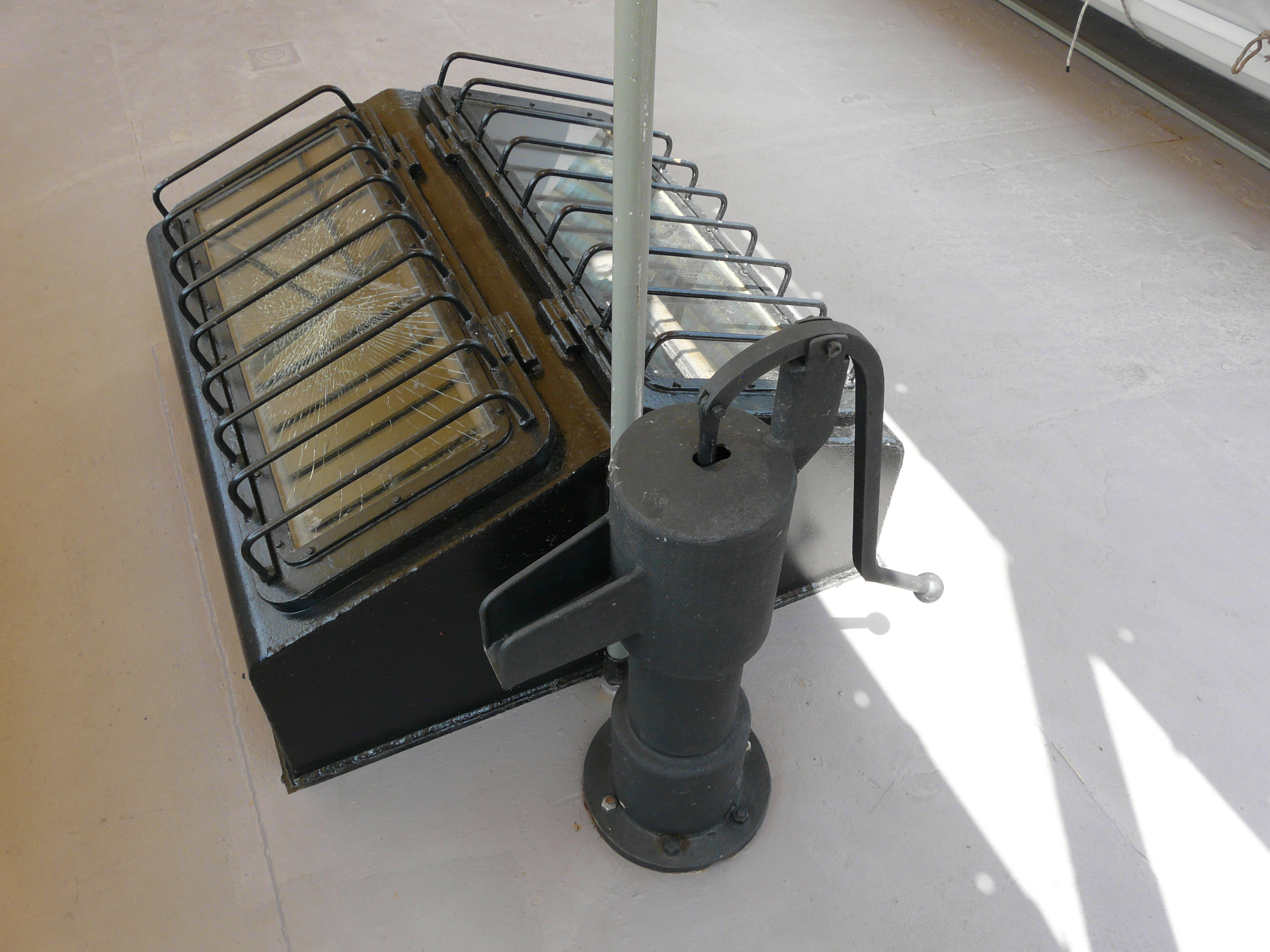
The water pump

== Bibliography ==
- Caruana, Joseph; et al. (2005). "Question 22/04: Austro-Hungarian Danube River Monitors". Warship International. XLII (3): 238–242. ISSN 0043-0374.
- Dodson, Aidan (2021). "SMS Leitha". In Jordan, John (ed.). Warship 2021. Oxford, UK: Osprey Publishing. pp. 194–196. ISBN 978-1-4728-4779-9.
- Frampton, Viktor; Sieche, Erwin & Stewart, Charles L. (2006). "Question 22/04: Austro-Hungarian Danube River Monitors". Warship International. XLIII (3): 239–243. ISSN 0043-0374.
- Klein, Herbert (2012). "The Danube Monitor SMS Leitha". Warship International. XLIX (3): 233–241. ISSN 0043-0374.
- András Margitay-Becht: A Leitha monitor... és a többiek (2007) ISBN 978-963-7097-26-3 (The Leitha monitor and others -Hungarian book)
