= Paul Stupar =

Austro-Hungarian naval officer

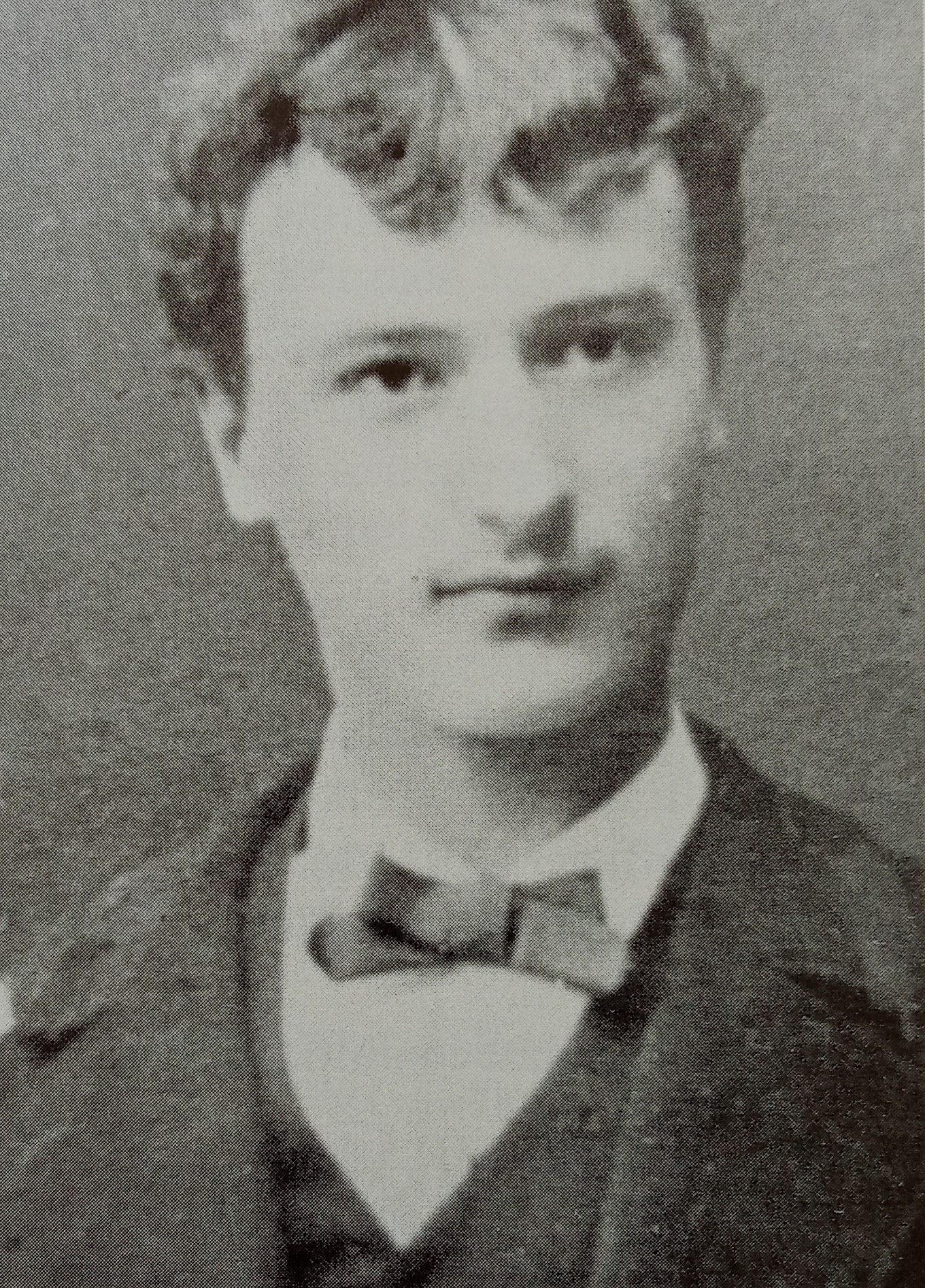
- Stupar in 1887
- Born: 27 December 1866; Pazin, Austrian Empire (now Croatia)
- Died: 26 January 1928 (aged 61); Vienna, Austria-Hungary
- Military career
- Allegiance: Austria-Hungary
- Branch: Austro-Hungarian Navy
- Service years: 1886–1928
- Rank: Rear Admiral
- Commands: Commander of the minelayer Salamander (1907-1910); Commander of the torpedo boat Satellit (1910-1912); Commander of the light cruiser Aspern (1913); Commander of the armored cruiser Sankt Georg (1913); Commander of the battleship Babenberg (1914); Commander of the military warehouses of Šibenik (1914-1917); Commander of the battleship Erzherzog Friedrich (1917-)
- Conflicts: First World War
- Awards: Military Merit Cross 3rd Class; Military Merit Cross 3rd Class

Paul Stupar (27 December 1866 – 26 January 1928) was an Austro-Hungarian naval officer holding the rank of rear admiral.

== Early life ==
Stupar was born on 27 December 1866 in Pazin, Austria-Hungary, to Jakov and Maria Stupar (née Camus), and was baptized as Paulus Ioannes (Paul Johann, Pavao Ivan). Stupar's father Jakob was a lower official at the district court of Pazin.

In 1882, Stupar enrolled at the Austrian Imperial and Royal Naval Academy in Fiume, graduating in 1886, the year in which he began his career in the navy.

In July 1898, he was part of the commission of a fire extinguishing experiment.

== Career ==
Stupar is noted with the rank of ship-of-the-line lieutenant (Linienschiffsleutnant) in 1901-04 on the staff list of Rijeka's naval academy. His brother Anthäus was professor at the academy from 1903 until 1914.

In 1907, Stupar was appointed commander of the minelayer Salamander in Pula. In 1910, he commanded the torpedo boat Satellit as corvette captain, and in 1912 was promoted to the rank of frigate captain. In 1913 he then commanded the light cruiser Aspern, participating in the naval blockade of Montenegro. He assumed command of the armored cruiser Sankt Georg in August 1913 and commanded it until October of that year. In March 1914 he became the commander of the battleship Babenberg.

He commanded the military warehouses in Šibenik since August 1914, with the rank of battleship captain.

He commanded the battleship Erzherzog Friedrich in 1917, and on 1 May 1918 was promoted counter admiral (i.e. rear admiral).

Stupar was twice awarded the Military Merit Cross 3rd Class.

== Sources ==
- Dienstbestimmungen, Polaer Tagbatt, 495., 3. 3. 1907.; Almanach für die k. und k. Kriegsmarine 1918., Pola; Nenad Labus, "Vojnopomorska akademija - spisak zaposlenika od 1858. do 1918."
