= SMS Satellit =

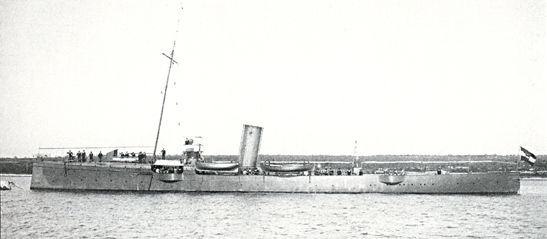
- SMS Satellit

History

Austro-Hungarian Empire
- Name: Satellit
- Builder: Schichau-Werke, Elbląg
- Laid down: January 1892
- Launched: 21 September 1892
- Completed: 24 June 1893
- Decommissioned: 1918
- Fate: Scrapped, 1921

General characteristics (as built)
- Displacement: 616 long tons (626 t)
- Length: 69.32 m (227 ft 5 in)
- Beam: 8.15 m (26 ft 9 in)
- Draft: 2.9 m (9 ft 6 in)
- Speed: 23 knots (43 km/h; 26 mph)
- Armament: 1 × 70 mm Skoda L/42 gun; 8 × 47 mm Skoda L/44 rapid-fire guns; 2 × 45 cm torpedo tubes

SMS Satellit was a gunboat which was ordered from Schichau in 1892. It was the fastest boat in the Austrian Imperial and Royal Navy from its delivery to the delivery of the SMS Magnet, likewise built at Schichau. Satellit differed significantly in size and propulsion from the three Meteor-class "torpedo ships" delivered in 1887/1888. On the other hand, the later Magnet also differed significantly from her with her two funnels. The Trabant, built before her in Trieste was the same in terms of size, appearance and technical design (1890, 610 t), its most similar boat in the Austro-Hungarian Navy. The ship was significantly modernized in 1912 with the installation of modern Yarrow boilers. With this work, she also received three new tall funnels, giving her a unique look. Satellit remained in coastal defense service until the end of World War I.

== Building ==
In 1885, the Imperial and Royal Navy began placing orders for torpedo boats for coastal defense. The first contractor was the F. Schichau in Elbing, which in 1886 with SMS Sperber and Habichtwere the first boats of this 78 t-displacement type. Five more boats of this type from Schichau followed in 1888 and 1889, of which 15 were also built in Austria. Similar to the so-called Divisionstorpedobooten in Germany, the Imperial and Royal Navy ordered the three boats of the 360 t-displacing Meteor class as "torpedo ships" from Schichau at about the same time. However, other applicants for the tender were also considered. Here, however, other applicants for the tender were also considered. In 1889 the Planet was launched at Palmers in Jarrow, and in 1890 the Trabant was launched at the Stabilimento Tecnico Triestino in Trieste. The two boats, weighing around 500 t, did not quite meet expectations, in particular they did not reach the required top speeds.

Nevertheless, the Imperial and Royal Navy ordered a very similar type from Schichau in 1891, for which the steel used was to be supplied to a large extent from Austria. The boat with twin screw propulsion, started under construction number 482 in January 1892, was finally named SMS Satellit, was launched on September 21 and carried out its first sea test between Pillau and the Hel on 30 December 1892, reaching 21.86 knots became.

The Austro-Hungarian Navy's first twin-screw ship, delivered by Schichau, had four cylinder boilers that operated at up to 13 atm pressure and generated the steam for two triple-expansion engines that could produce up to 4800 PSI. This allowed speeds of up to 23 knots to be reached. With a coal supply of 143 t, the new boat had a range of 4000 nm at 12 knots.

The boat was armed with a 70 mm L/42 Skoda gun and eight 47 mm L/44 Skoda rapid-fire guns mounted on the sides. These guns corresponded to the models used on the predecessors Planet and Trabant. The torpedo tubes were of the larger caliber 45 cm; the torpedo armament consisted of a fixed bow tube and a rotating tube on the quarterdeck.

On 21 March 1893, the satellite began its transfer journey to the Mediterranean. En route the boat visited Dartmouth for a week, ran briefly to Brest, visited Cádiz, called at Gibraltar and then visited Palermo before entering the Austrian naval port of Pola on 21 April. The equipment of the boat was completed in the arsenal there.

== Mission history ==
SMS Satellit, which arrived in Pola in April, was put into service on 24 June 1893. First, she conducted tests of the torpedo armament in the Fasana Channel before being assigned to the fleet squadron. In the spring of 1894, the boat's mine throwing device was installed. In a speed test under operational conditions on 12 April, she only reached a speed of 19.75 kn. On 16 April, the boat then collided with the Panzerschiff Habsburg, severely damaging the bow and breaking the bow torpedo tube. The Satellit was towed up to September to carry out the repair. In 1895 the boat, which had since been repaired, was not actively used. It was again used only in the summer of 1896.

=== Deployment off Crete ===
The landing of Greek troops on Crete in February 1897 during the Greco-Turkish War led to the intervention of the great powers and the Austro-Hungarian Navy was one of the organizations that intervened massively. A total of 20 ships and boats of the Austro-Hungarian Navy were deployed off Crete, and the Austrian naval association, with 16 units at times, was the third largest after the British Royal Navy and the Italian Regia Marina.

The satellite moved to Crete on 17 February 1897 together with the torpedo boats Sperber, Kiebitz and Elster as the first reinforcement group. The flagship of the Austrian Intervention Association was the armored cruiser SMS Kaiserin und Königin Maria Theresia. The tower ship SMS Kronprinzessin Erzherzogin Stephanie and the older torpedo ship SMS Sebenico were already there. The marching division filled in Teodo (today Tivat, Montenegro) and reached Canea (Chania) on 22 February. While the small torpedo boats had considerable difficulties in the wintry weather conditions, the Satellit managed to locate suspicious ships in the first few days of operation. The Austrian units constantly changed their locations and were reinforced by the torpedo cruiser SMS Tiger, the torpedo gunboats Blitz and Komet and another five torpedo boats until mid-April.

The Cretan State, created under pressure from the great powers, led to a large-scale withdrawal of the intervention units. The Satellit did not leave the mission group off Crete until December 13, which now had only eight units, in order to head north with the formation's new flagship, the coastal armored ship SMS Wien. The Satellit visited Syros en route and then Smyrna, where the Wien had gone and stayed until over Christmas. The Satellit started its return home on 18 December 1897 and returned to Pola on the last day of the year. Her operational time off Crete was only surpassed by the torpedo cruiser Tiger. On 4 January 1898 the boat was decommissioned.

=== Other uses and modifications ===
The satellite was in service after the Crete mission in the summer of 1898 and 1900 and otherwise in reserve. In the winter of 1902, the boiler and machinery were overhauled before the boat took part in the summer exercises. In spring 1904 she caught up with the squadron practicing in the Levant in Smyrna with the battleships Habsburg and Arpad and the coastal defence ship Monarch and then marched on via Alexandria, Kefalonia and Valona (Vlorë).

On 3 January 1905, the Satellit was doing some experiments off Pola when a torpedo boat tried to overtake her, with the Satellit ramming and sinking. The commander was cleared of any responsibility for causing the accident, but was convicted of failing to initiate rescue efforts and dismissed. In 1905 another trip abroad took place from February to April, during which several ports in the Levant were called at. The Satellit ran out together with the cruiser Aspern to join the battleships Habsburg, Arpad and Babenberg. The squadron also included the frequently detached cruiser Szigetvár. There were longer stays from 20 February to 8 March in Thessaloniki and from 17 March to 6 April in Smyrna. In the late summer of 1905, the Satellit collided again with a torpedo boat during a night exercise. On 23 December 1905 the boat was decommissioned and assigned to the reserve in 1906. The bow torpedo tube, which was again significantly damaged, was removed and the bow closed. Aft of the bridge, two sideways rotating torpe tubes were installed on deck. Despite this modernization, the boat remained in reserve in 1907 and 1908 and was not commissioned again until 1909.

Lussino (Lošinj) became the boat's new base and then in January 1910 Teodo (today Tivat). From October the boat was primarily used at the Naval Academy in Fiume (now Rijeka). However, it also regularly took part in the summer maneuvers until it was taken out of service again on 15 August 1912 for a major overhaul.

The boat received three modern Yarrow boilers and three funnels. After some initial tests, this was expanded and increased by one meter. Finally, a drive power of 4137 hp was added and a top speed of 21.18 kn was reached. As a three-chimney destroyer, the Satellit was put back into service on 14 June 1913 and completed surveying tasks around the Istrian peninsula. Laid up on 25 October, she resumed this activity on 14 March 1914.

=== War deployment ===
When the war started in 1914, Satellit was off Porto Ré (now Kraljevica) and then went to Pola where the mine installation was added, taking over 60 mines to supplement the defensive mine barriers. In the period that followed, she towed submarines to Cattaro (Kotor), but also back to Pola. In 1915 and 1916 she then completed local security tasks in the area of Pola-Fiume.

On 1 August 1916, the Satellit discovered the crew of the Italian submarine Giacinto Pullino, which ran aground the day before near the small Dalmatian island of Galiola, fleeing on a sailboat. The submarine's navigator, Nazario Sauro, an Istrian who had volunteered for the Italians at the start of the war, was also caught. Sauro, as an Austrian citizen, was executed in Pola on 10 August 1916.

In October 1916 the boat was stationed in Cattaro and mainly provided escort service until the end of the war. In addition, some mine-laying and minesweeping operations were carried out. After the surrender in 1918, the British administration of the base took over the boat.

=== End of the Satellit ===
Satellit was awarded to France in 1920 and delivered in tow via Bizerte to Toulon, where it was scrapped in 1921.

== Sources ==
- Robert Gardiner, Roger Chesneau, Eugène M. Kolesnik (Hrsg.): Conway's all the World's Fighting Ships, 1860–1905, Conway Maritime Press, London 1979, ISBN 0-85177-130-0
- Jane's Fighting Ships of World War I, ISBN 1-85170-378-0
- Erwin Sieche: Torpedoschiffe und Zerstörer der K. u. K. Marine, Marine-Arsenal: volume 34, Podzun-Pallas-Verlag, Wölfersheim-Berstadt (1996), ISBN 3-7909-0546-1
- B. Weyer: Taschenbuch der Kriegsflotten, J.F. Lehmanns Verlag, Munich, 1905
