= SMS Zenta =

Protected cruiser of the Austro-Hungarian Navy

- Zenta in Pola in 1901 after returning from China

History

Austria-Hungary
- Name: Zenta
- Namesake: Battle of Zenta
- Builder: Pola Navy Yard
- Laid down: 8 August 1896
- Launched: 18 August 1897
- Sponsored by: Archduchess Maria Josepha
- Commissioned: 25 May 1899
- Fate: Sunk during the Battle of Antivari, 16 August 1914

General characteristics
- Class & type: Zenta-class protected cruiser
- Displacement: Normal: 2,350 t (2,313 long tons); Full load: 2,543 t (2,503 long tons)
- Length: 96.88 m (317 ft 10 in)
- Beam: 11.73 m (38 ft 6 in)
- Draft: 4.24 m (13 ft 11 in)
- Installed power: 8 × Yarrow boilers; 7,200 ihp (5,400 kW)
- Propulsion: 2 × triple-expansion steam engines; 2 × screw propellers
- Sail plan: Brigantine-rigged
- Speed: 21 knots (39 km/h; 24 mph)
- Range: 3,200 nmi (5,900 km; 3,700 mi) at 12 knots (22 km/h; 14 mph)
- Complement: 308
- Armament: 8 × single Škoda 12 cm (4.7 in) guns; 4 × single Škoda 47 mm (1.9 in) guns; 2 × single Hotchkiss 47 mm guns; 2 × single 8 mm (0.31 in) machine guns; 2 × 45 cm (17.7 in) torpedo tubes
- Armor: Deck: 25–50 mm (1–2 in); Conning tower: 50 mm; Casemates: 35 mm (1.4 in)

SMS Zenta was the lead ship of the Zenta class of protected cruisers built for the Austro-Hungarian Navy in the late 1890s. The class included two other vessels, Aspern and Szigetvár. The Zentas were intended to serve as fleet scouts and to guard the battleships against attacks by torpedo boats. She carried a main battery of eight 12 cm (4.7 in) guns manufactured by Škoda; Zenta and her sisters were the first major warships of the Austro-Hungarian fleet to be armed entirely with domestically produced guns. Unlike earlier Austro-Hungarian cruisers, the Zenta class discarded heavy belt armor in favor of a higher top speed.

After entering service in 1899, Zenta was sent to East Asia to represent Austria-Hungary in the region. She was involved in the Boxer Rebellion in Qing China in 1900, sending landing parties ashore as part of the Eight-Nation Alliance to guard the Legation Quarter and to fight in the Battle of the Taku Forts. Zenta returned home in 1901 and was sent on another long-distance cruise in 1902–1903 to visit various ports in Africa and South America. The ship served in home waters beginning in 1904, spending her time with training exercises. In 1913, during the First Balkan War, she participated in the blockade of Montenegro by an international fleet.

At the start of World War I in July 1914, Zenta was sent to the southern end of the Adriatic Sea to attack targets in Montenegro. She was cruising off that country's coast to enforce another blockade on 16 August when she and the destroyer Ulan encountered the main French battle fleet. In the ensuing Battle of Antivari, Zenta was sunk by the French battleships, with heavy loss of life as the French failed to pick up survivors. Some 139 men, including her commander Paul Pachner, swam to shore, where they were captured by Montenegrin forces and imprisoned until 1916 when the Austro-Hungarian Army overran the country.

== Design ==
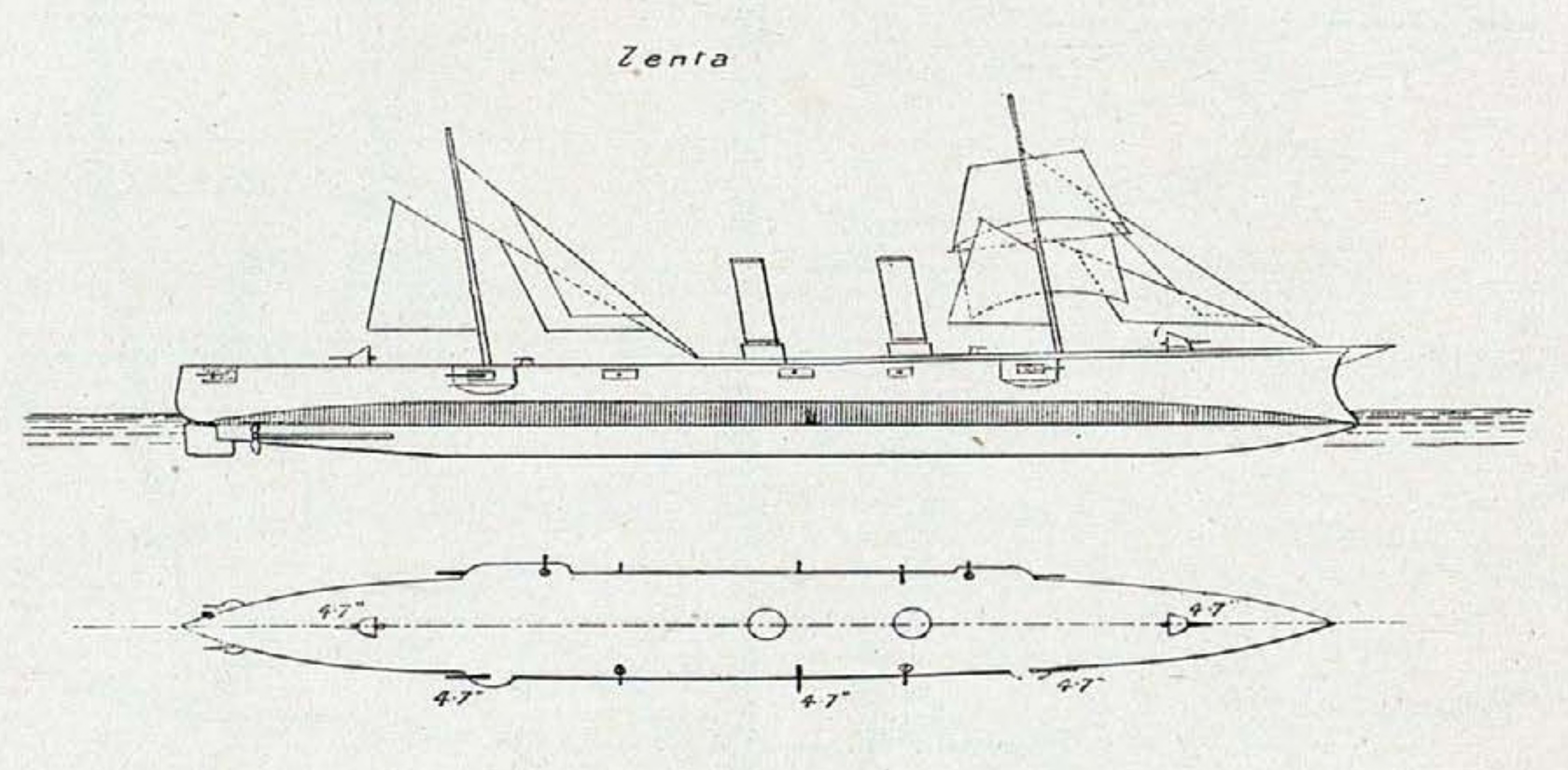
Line-drawing of the Zenta class

In January 1895, the senior officers of the Austro-Hungarian Navy decided to build two types of modern cruisers: large armored cruisers of around 5,900 t (5,800 long tons) and smaller vessels of around 1,700 t (1,700 long tons). The latter were intended to screen the battleships of the main fleet, scouting for enemy vessels and protecting them from torpedo boat attacks. The chief constructor, Josef Kuchinka, prepared the initial design based on specifications that had been issued by the naval command, though by the time his design was finally approved in mid-1897, it had grown in size to around 2,300 t (2,300 long tons). Final approval came after work on the first unit, Zenta, had already begun.

Zenta was 96 m (315 ft) long at the waterline and 96.88 m (317 ft 10 in) long overall; she had a beam of 11.73 m (38 ft 6 in) and a draft of 4.24 m (13 ft 11 in). The ship displaced 2,350 t (2,313 long tons) normally and 2,543 t (2,503 long tons) at full load. The crew of the Zentas numbered 308 officers and enlisted men. Their propulsion system consisted of a pair of triple-expansion steam engines, each driving a screw propeller using steam provided by eight coal-fired Yarrow boilers. Their engines were rated to produce 7,200 indicated horsepower (5,400 kW) for a top speed of 21 knots (39 km/h; 24 mph), although Zenta reached a speed of 21.87 knots (40.50 km/h; 25.17 mph) from 8,584 ihp (6,401 kW) during her sea trials on 30 March 1899. The ships carried enough coal to give them a range of 3,800 nautical miles (7,000 km; 4,400 mi) at 12 knots (22 km/h; 14 mph). To increase their range, the cruisers were fitted with a brigantine-sailing rig of 585.8 square meters (6,305 sq ft) on their two masts.

The Zentas' main battery consisted of eight 40-caliber 12-centimeter (4.7 in) quick-firing guns manufactured by Škoda. One gun was mounted on the upper deck forward, six in casemates in the hull, and the remaining gun was placed on the upper deck aft. They also carried eight 44-caliber 47-millimeter (1.9 in) Škoda guns and two 33-caliber 47 mm Hotchkiss guns for defense against torpedo boats. These guns were all mounted individually, with four in the superstructure and the rest in casemates in the hull. The ships also carried a pair of 8 mm (0.31 in) Salvator-Dormus M1893 machine guns. Their armament was rounded out with a pair of 45 cm (17.7 in) torpedo tubes that were carried in the hull above the waterline. The three Zenta-class cruisers were the first major Austro-Hungarian warships to carry an armament entirely manufactured by Škoda.

Their armor deck consisted of two layers of 12.5 mm (0.49 in) steel over the bow and stern. Amidships, where it protected the propulsion machinery spaces, it doubled in thickness to a pair of 25 mm (0.98 in) layers. The casemates for the primary guns had 35 mm (1.4 in) thick sides and the conning tower received two layers of 25 mm plate on the sides. Each of the 120 mm guns was protected by a 45-millimeter (1.8 in) gun shield, although they were not large enough to provide good cover for the gun crews.

== Service history ==
Zenta at anchor

=== Construction and deployment to China, 1896–1901 ===
Zenta, ordered under the contract name Ersatz (replacement) Greif, was laid down at the Pola Navy Yard on 8 August 1896 and was launched on 18 August 1897, the birthday of Kaiser Franz Joseph I. The ship was christened by his sister-in-law, Archduchess Maria Josepha. Fitting-out work was delayed by shortages of the 12 cm guns, since four of the guns that were slated to be installed aboard the ship were instead diverted to Spain on 11 July, which was in need of additional weapons as it was in the midst of fighting the Cuban War of Independence. Additional guns were ordered on 27 April 1898 and were delivered on 22 April 1899. Named for the Battle of Zenta, the ship was completed on 25 May, at a cost of 4.2 million krone, commissioned three days later, and was ordered to deploy to East Asia to serve as the station ship in Chinese waters. She left Pola on 10 November 1899 and relieved the homeward-bound station ship, the protected cruiser Kaiserin Elisabeth, in Colombo, British Ceylon between 22 and 28 December.

The ship arrived in Singapore on 3 January 1900 and then continued on to Hong Kong. Zenta embarked on a tour of ports in China in February, including those along the Yangtze River, before returning to Shanghai on 7 May. From there, she crossed to Japan, where the ship was on 30 May when the worsening Boxer Rebellion prompted the European diplomats in the country to request forces to guard the Legation Quarter. Zenta joined the international fleet that assembled as part of the Eight-Nation Alliance off the Taku Forts on 2 June; she operated there for the next twenty days. On 3 June, a landing party led by the ship's captain, Fregattenkapitän Eduard von Montalmar, that consisted of one officer, two officer cadets, and thirty enlisted men went ashore to relieve the Legations; they helped to guard the embassies there during the siege of the Legations for the next two months. Another party, consisting of an officer, three cadets, and seventy-three men joined the force that stormed the Taku Forts on 17 June. Montalmar and three sailors were killed during the war with another four sailors later dying of their wounds.

Zenta moved to Chefoo from 23 to 25 June and then returned to Taku from 26 June to 5 August. The armored cruiser Kaiserin und Königin Maria Theresia arrived in Taku two days later and her commander took control of Austro-Hungarian naval forces in the region. On 24 November, the ship returned to Japan, where she was briefly drydocked for maintenance in December. In early January 1901, Zenta then sailed south to Bangkok, Siam, arriving there on 17 January. The ship arrived in Hong Kong on 15 February to begin a tour of Chinese ports that lasted through May. She next visited Chemulpo in Korea later that month, followed by a brief stop in Japan. The ship returned to Chinese waters for the next two months before she received orders to return home. Zenta left China on 25 July and reached Pola on 1 October and was thereafter placed in reserve.

=== African cruise, 1902–1903 ===
Zenta at anchor

Zenta spent most of 1902 in reserve, but she was reactivated late in the year for a training cruise to Africa and South America. She left Pola on 15 October and reached Mombasa, British Kenya, on 22 November. From there, the ship cruised to Zanzibar and by 6 December had arrived in Diego Suarez, French Madagascar. Later that month, Zenta visited Tamatave, Madagascar, and Saint-Louis on the island of Réunion. On 2 January 1903, she got underway for Delagoa Bay and Lourenço Marques in Portuguese Mozambique. Zenta then proceeded to Durban, East London, Port Elizabeth, and Cape Town in the British Cape Colony and Colony of Natal through early March. She then passed to the Atlantic coast of southern Africa, stopping in German Southwest Africa and then visited Luanda in Portuguese Angola. At the end of March, the ship stopped in Banana and Boma in the Congo Free State, entering the Congo River and steaming to Matadi, Congo on 1 April.

From Congo, Zenta dropped anchor in Saint Helena on the way to South America before arriving at Santos, Brazil, on 8 May. Later that month visited Montevideo, Uruguay, staying there until 6 June when she crossed the Río de la Plata to Buenos Aires, Argentina. The next day, she entered the Paraná River and traveled to Rosario, Argentina, for two days before returning to Buenos Aires. Zenta then returned to Brazilian waters before returning to western Africa, arriving in Freetown, Sierra Leone, on 22 July. The ship then continued north, stopping in Dakar, French Senegal a week later and then Tenerife in the Canary Islands in Spain, arriving there in early August. She arrived at Funchal on the island of Madeira later that month. The ship next visited several ports in French North Africa along with Málaga, Spain, through September. From there, she began the last leg of the trip, stopping in Corfu, Greece from 22 September and then passing through Trieste on 2 October, where she was present for the launching of the pre-dreadnought battleship Erzherzog Karl. The ship arrived back in Pola four days later.

=== Service in home waters, 1904–1914 ===
Zenta in port with awnings erected

From 1 January 1904 to 15 June, Zenta served as the flotilla leader for the Torpedo-boat Flotilla of the main fleet. During this period, on 20 January, the Hungarian shipping company Adria requested the navy's assistance with locating the merchant ship SS Matelkovits, which had departed Venice on 12 January and had not been seen since. Zenta and a pair of torpedo boats conducted a search, but did not locate the vessel. The summer's training activities began on 15 June, and throughout the maneuvers, which lasted through 15 September, Zenta continued in her role as the flotilla leader. She was present for a visit of the British Royal Navy in Pola, including the pre-dreadnought HMS Bulwark, the cruisers Furious and Pandora, and the torpedo gunboat Speedy. The rest of the year was spent in dry dock to have her bow 12 cm guns altered, wireless equipment installed, and repairs made to her bow after a collision with a merchant ship in Trieste.

Zenta rejoined the main fleet on 1 January 1905, resuming her role as a flotilla leader. The year followed the same schedule as the previous year, with the summer training program beginning on 15 June and ending on 15 September. Zenta was present for the launching of the battleship Erzherzog Ferdinand Max on 21 May that year. She was placed in reserve toward the end of the year and remained out of service into 1906, only being recommissioned for the summer maneuvers, which again lasted from 15 June to 15 September. During the maneuvers, which concluded with a simulated amphibious assault that was observed by Archduke Franz Ferdinand, she served with the battleships of II Heavy Division. Following the exercises, the fleet held a naval review off Calamotta on 15 September, after which Zenta was reduced to reserve status. She again spent 1907 out of service except for the summer exercises, partially due to repairs to her double bottom; in 1908, she was not activated at all.

On 16 March 1909, Zenta was recommissioned to join an international naval demonstration off the coast of the Levant; the Austro-Hungarian contingent also included the armored cruiser Kaiser Karl VI and the torpedo gunboat Magnet. The ships left Pola on 22 April and steamed to Piraeus, Greece, where they joined the international fleet and stayed from 26 April to 2 May. Zenta patrolled off Mersin and Antioch, Ottoman Turkey, for several weeks before returning to Greece on the 16th. She remained there until 5 June when she departed for Teodo, Montenegro, arriving three days later. Zenta was present for the launching of the pre-dreadnought Radetzky in Trieste on 3 July and was thereafter placed in reserve. She was reactivated on 15 June for the maneuvers. Another training amphibious operation was conducted on 24 August, with Zenta assigned to the defending force. She was decommissioned again on 31 August.

The ship was only intermittently in service for the next several years, attending the launching of the pre-dreadnought Zrinyi on 12 April 1910 and then observing the launching of the dreadnought battleship Viribus Unitis in Trieste on 24 June 1911. During this time she had a new radio transmitter installed. During the First Balkan War of 1913, an international fleet was composed to blockade Montenegro over its occupation of the port of Scutari. Zenta was sent as part of the Austro-Hungarian contingent, departing Pola on 19 March and two days later she arrived to patrol off Meljine. The ship saw little activity for the rest of the year, and on 1 April 1914, she was assigned to a training cruise in company with the old coastal defense ships Monarch and Babenberg with a contingent of 240 naval cadets. While in Gravosa on 10 April, the crew was exposed to an outbreak of meningitis; one man fell ill and had to be sent ashore in Ragusa the next day. The infection began to spread and on 1 May, another man had to be hospitalized in Cattaro; Zenta was ordered to return to Pola to be quarantined in Fasana the next day. Forty of the cadets were sent ashore to be hospitalized, another sixty were transferred to the tender Spalato, and the remainder were kept aboard to help disinfect the ship. The quarantine was lifted fifteen days later on 17 May.

=== World War I ===
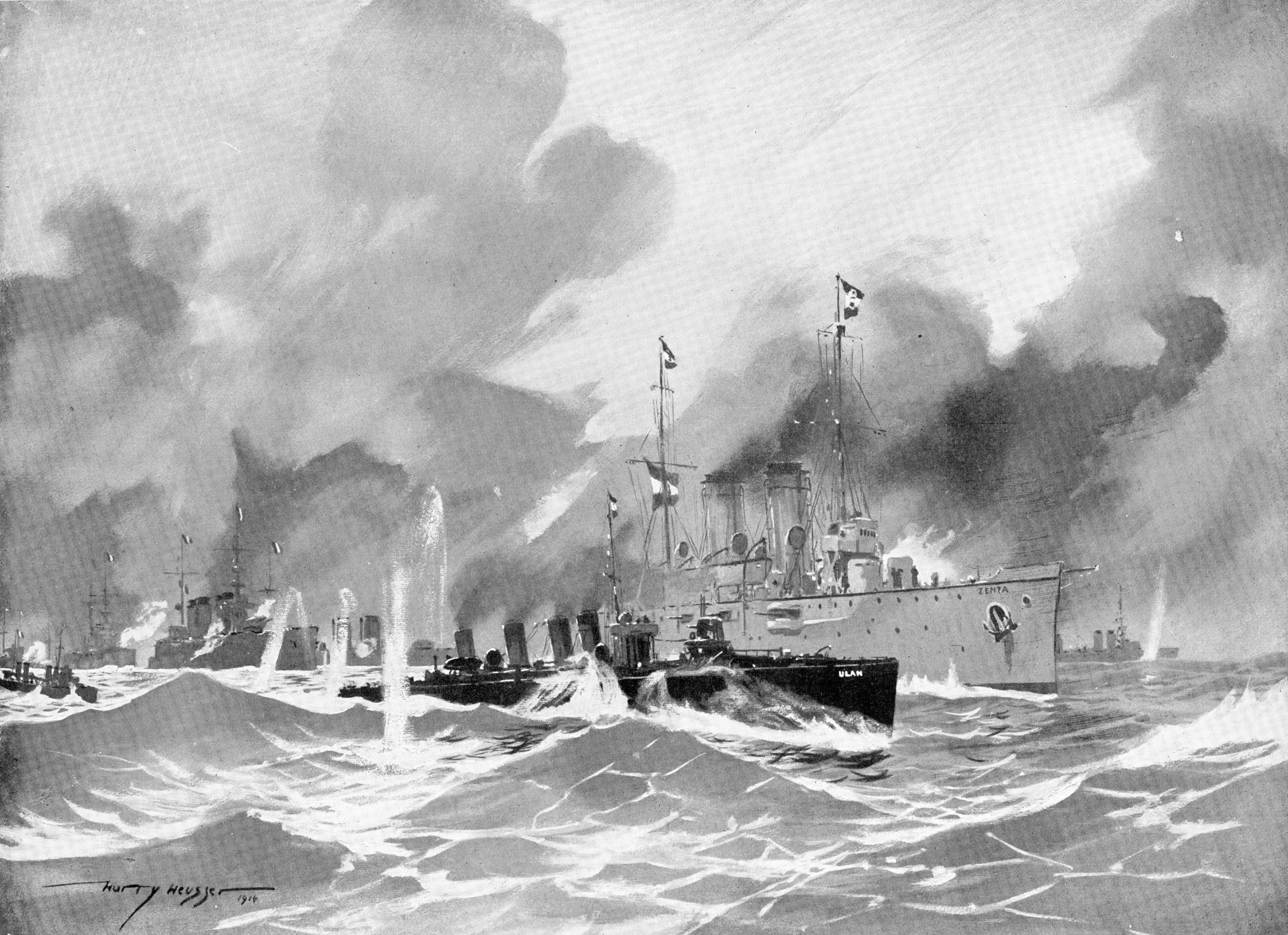
Painting showing SMS Zenta and SMS Ulan in action on 16 August 1914

At the start of World War I in July 1914, Zenta was assigned to I Cruiser Division, which at that time included the armored cruisers Sankt Georg, Kaiser Karl VI, Kaiserin und Königin Maria Theresia, and the other two Zenta-class cruisers, under the command of Vice Admiral Paul Fiedler. On 8 August, Zenta and her sister ship Szigetvár steamed south to bombard the wireless station at Antivari. The ships of I Cruiser Division then began a blockade of the coast of Montenegro. Eight days later, Zenta sortied again, now in company with the destroyer Ulan to patrol the blockade line off Teodo. The same day, the main French fleet, the 1er Armée Navale (1st Naval Army) under Admiral Augustin Boué de Lapeyrère's command, entered the southern Adriatic to search for the Austro-Hungarian fleet.

==== Battle of Antivari ====
At around 08:30, lookouts in the French fleet spotted smoke on the horizon as they steamed north, prompting Boué de Lapeyrère to turn his ships to investigate. The Austro-Hungarians had in turn spotted the approaching French fleet, and so moved closer to shore to flee north, hoping the coastline would obscure them. At 09:03, the French fleet encountered Zenta and Ulan off the coast of Montenegro and opened fire, though Boué de Lapeyrère initially ordered his battleships to fire warning shots, but this caused confusion among the fleet's gunners. Zenta, commanded by Paul Pachner, turned to engage the French while Ulan fled to the north at high speed. Zenta came under a hail of French gunfire, though the sheer volume hampered French gunnery, as it was impossible to determine each ships' fall of shot. Zenta fired her 12 cm guns, though they fell some 300 to 400 m (980 to 1,310 ft) short, and would not have inflicted damage on the heavily armored battleships in any event. The slower Zenta attempted to evade French gunfire, but she quickly received several hits that disabled her engines and set her on fire by about 09:12. At 09:20, Boué de Lapeyrère ordered his ships to cease fire, by which time Zenta was burning badly and settling by the stern. By 09:30, Zenta's bow lurched upward at an angle of 45 degrees and quickly sank around 4 to 5 nmi (7.4 to 9.3 km; 4.6 to 5.8 mi) off the coast of Castellastua, her flags still flying.

Her crew suffered heavy casualties in the battle, with 173 men killed, though 139, including Pachner, managed to swim to shore. The French failed to pick up survivors, as Boué de Lapeyrère assumed that Zenta's boats could pick them up, or they could swim to shore. They were captured by Montenegrin forces and imprisoned as prisoners of war in Podgorica. By early 1916, the Austro-Hungarian Army had defeated Montenegro and the survivors from Zenta were freed. Ulan, meanwhile, successfully fled north, having been pursued by the French destroyer screen and the armored cruiser Jurien de la Gravière.
