= Leitha-class river monitor =

Class overview
- Name: Leitha
- Builders: Pest Flumaner Schiffbau, Budapest
- Operators: Austro-Hungarian Navy; Danube Guard; Royal Yugoslav Navy
- Preceded by: None
- Succeeded by: Körös class
- Built: 1870–1872
- In service: 1872–1918
- Completed: 2
- Retired: 1
- Scrapped: 1

General characteristics
- Type: River monitor
- Length: 50.5 m (165 ft 8 in)
- Beam: 8.65 m (28 ft 5 in)
- Draught: 1.3 m (4 ft 3 in)
- Installed power: 700 ihp (520 kW)
- Propulsion: 2 screws; 2 double-expansion steam engines
- Speed: 8.3 knots (15.4 km/h; 9.6 mph)
- Armament: As built: 2 × single 15 cm (5.9 in) cannon; 2 × 4-barreled 19 mm (0.7 in) Nordenfelt guns; After 1892: 1 × single 120 mm (4.7 in) gun; 2 × single 47 mm (1.9 in) revolver cannon; 1 × single 8 mm (0.3 in) machine gun; 1915: 1 × single 120 mm gun; 2 or 3 × single 66 mm (2.6 in) guns; 2 × 5-barreled 37 mm (1.5 in) revolver cannon; 2 × single 8 mm Schwarzlose machine guns

The Leitha class consisted of two river monitors built for the Austro-Hungarian Navy that saw service during World War I.

== Ships ==
Ship	Builder	Laid down	Launched	Commissioned	Fate
SMS Leitha	Pest Flumaner Schiffbau, Budapest	1870	17 May 1871	13 October 1872	Museum ship, 20 August 2010
SMS Maros	Pest Flumaner Schiffbau, Budapest	1870	20 April 1871	13 October 1872	Scrapped, January 1921

== Bibliography ==
- Branfill-Cook, Roger (2018). River Gunboats: An Illustrated Encyclopedia. Barnsley, UK: Seaforth Publishing. ISBN 978-1-84832-365-0.
- Dodson, Aidan & Cant, Serena (2020). Spoils of War: The Fate of Enemy Fleets after Two World Wars. Barnsley, UK: Seaforth Publishing. ISBN 978-1-5267-4198-1.
- Freivogel, Zvonimir (2020). Warships of the Royal Yugoslav Navy 1918–1945. Vol. 1. Zagreb, Croatia: Despot Infinitus. ISBN 978-953-8218-72-9.
- Greger, René (1976). Austro-Hungarian Warships of World War I. London: Ian Allan. ISBN 0-7110-0623-7.
