= Zenta-class cruiser =

Protected cruiser class of the Austro-Hungarian Navy

- Zenta, the lead ship of her class

Class overview
- Name: Zenta class
- Builders: Pola Naval Arsenal
- Operators: Austro-Hungarian Navy
- Preceded by: Kaiser Franz Joseph I class
- Cost: 4.2–4.5 million Krone
- Built: 1896–1901
- In service: 1899–1918
- In commission: 1899–1918
- Completed: 3
- Lost: 1
- Scrapped: 2

General characteristics
- Type: Protected cruiser
- Displacement: 2,313 long tons (2,350 t) (normal); 2,503 long tons (2,543 t) (Full load)
- Length: 96.88 m (317 ft 10 in)
- Beam: 11.73 m (38 ft 6 in)
- Draft: 4.24 m (13 ft 11 in)
- Installed power: 8 × Yarrow boilers; 8,160 ihp (6,080 kW)
- Propulsion: 2 × shafts; 2 × triple-expansion steam engines
- Speed: 20 knots (37 km/h; 23 mph)
- Range: 3,800 nmi (7,000 km; 4,400 mi) at 12 knots (22 km/h; 14 mph)
- Complement: 308
- Armament: 8 × Škoda 12 cm (4.7 in) guns; 8 × Škoda 47 mm (1.9 in) guns; 2 × Hotchkiss 47 mm guns; 2 × 8 mm (0.31 in) machine guns; 2 × 45 cm (17.7 in) torpedo tubes
- Armor: Deck: 25–50 mm (1–2 in); Conning tower: 50 mm; Casemates: 35 mm (1.4 in)

The Zenta class was a group of three protected cruisers built for the Austro-Hungarian Navy in the 1890s.

== Design ==
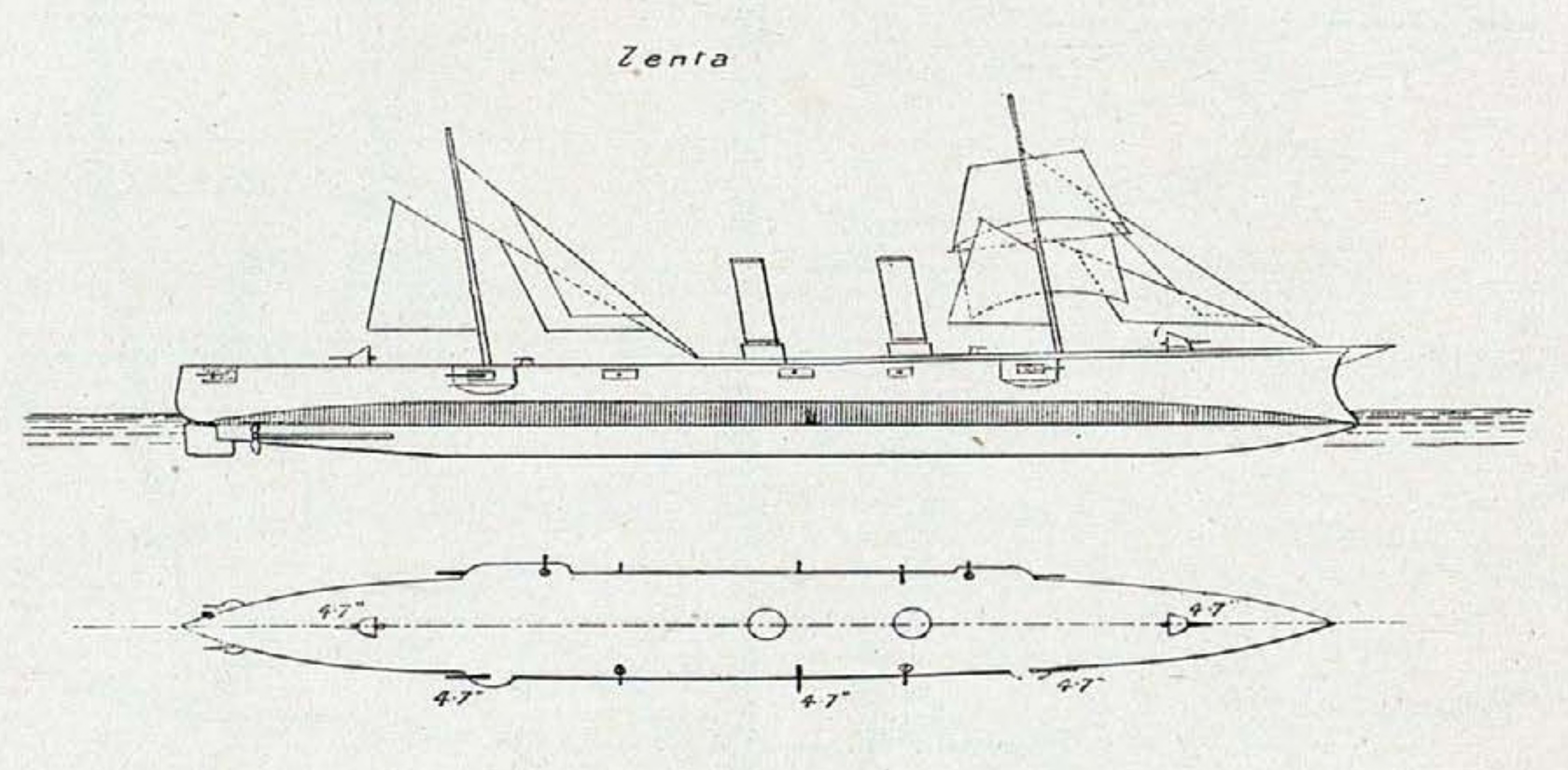
Line-drawing of the Zenta class

In January 1895, the senior officers of the Austro-Hungarian Navy decided to build two types of modern cruisers: large armored cruisers of around 5,800 long tons (5,900 t) and smaller vessels of around 1,700 long tons (1,700 t). The latter were intended to screen the battleships of the main fleet, scouting for enemy vessels and protecting them from torpedo boat attacks; they would also serve abroad on foreign stations. In a preliminary meeting on 22 January, the naval command issued a set of basic specifications for the projected small cruiser; the length was to be 94 m (308 ft 5 in), and the ship should carry an armament of eight 12 cm (4.7 in) guns and sixteen 47 mm (1.9 in) guns. The chief constructor, Josef Kuchinka, prepared the initial design based on specifications that had been issued by the naval command, and his proposal featured a top speed of 21 knots (39 km/h; 24 mph) and a cruising range of 3,800 nautical miles (7,000 km; 4,400 mi) at a speed of 12 knots (22 km/h; 14 mph). Since the speed of the new cruisers was the highest priority, the naval engineer Jakob Fassl held an evaluation in February to determine the best boiler to install in the vessels. Consideration was given to a number of boilers, including White-Forster, Thornycroft, and Locomotive boilers.

Work on the first vessel, provisionally titled "Kreuzer A", began on 8 August 1896, though the design would not be finalized for another nine months. During the lengthy design process, a number of changes were made. The torpedo tubes, originally planned to be in deck-mounted launchers, were moved to the hull above the waterline. The navy ultimately settled on Yarrow boilers for the ships, since it saved 56 long tons (57 t) compared to the other types. Triple-expansion steam engines were selected, but to achieve the high speed desired, they were installed "upside down", with the low-pressure cylinder in front of the higher-pressure cylinders. Because the ships were expected to serve overseas, the design staff originally planned to include a supplementary sailing rig with a surface area of 586 m^{2} (6,310 sq ft). The second member of the class, "Kreuzer B", received a layer of Muntz metal over a layer of teak to protect her hull on long voyages. Several other navies similarly experimented with sheathing their steel cruiser hulls, but the practice failed to produce the desired results. By the time design work had finished, the ships' displacement had grown to about 2,350 long tons (2,390 t). Due to the rapid pace of technological development at the turn of the 20th century, the Zenta class was rapidly rendered obsolete, and already by 1910, they were in need of replacement.

=== Characteristics ===
The ships of the Zenta class were 96 m (315 ft) long at the waterline and 96.88 m (317 ft 10 in) long overall; they had a beam of 11.73 m (38 ft 6 in) and a draft of 4.24 m (13 ft 11 in). Szigetvár displaced 2,313 long tons (2,350 t) normally and 2,503 long tons (2,543 t) at full load. Her crew numbered 308 officers and enlisted men. Her propulsion system consisted of a pair of triple-expansion steam engines each driving a screw propeller. Steam was provided by eight coal-fired Yarrow boilers. Her engines were rated to produce 8,160 indicated horsepower (6,080 kW) for a top speed of 20.8 knots (38.5 km/h; 23.9 mph).

The Zentas' main battery consisted of eight 12-centimeter (4.7 in) 40-caliber quick-firing guns manufactured by Škoda. One gun was mounted on the upper deck forward, six in casemates in the hull, and the remaining gun was placed on the upper deck aft. Their also carried four 47 mm (1.9 in) 44-cal. Škoda guns and two 47 mm 33-cal. Hotchkiss guns for defense against torpedo boats. These guns were all mounted individually, with four in the superstructure and the rest in casemates in the hull. They also carried a pair of Salvator-Dormus M1893 8 mm (0.31 in) machine guns. Their armament was rounded out with a pair of 45 cm (17.7 in) torpedo tubes that were carried in the hull above the waterline. The three Zenta-class cruisers were the first major Austro-Hungarian warships to carry an armament entirely manufactured by Škoda.

The ships' armor deck consisted of two layers of 12.5 mm (0.49 in) steel over the bow and stern. Amidships, where it protected the propulsion machinery spaces, it doubled in thickness to a pair of 25 mm (0.98 in) layers. The casemates for the primary guns had 35 mm (1.4 in) thick sides and the conning tower received two layers of 25 mm plate on the sides.

== Ships ==
Name	Namesake	Builder	Laid down	Launched	Commissioned	Fate
Zenta	Battle of Zenta	Pola Naval Arsenal	8 August 1896	18 August 1897	15 May 1899	Sunk during the Battle of Antivari, 16 August 1914
Aspern	Battle of Aspern	Pola Naval Arsenal	4 October 1897	3 May 1899	25 May 1900	Ceded to Great Britain, 19 September 1920, and sold to Italy for scrap
Szigetvár	Siege of Szigetvár	Pola Naval Arsenal	25 May 1899	29 October 1900	30 September 1901	Ceded to Great Britain, 19 September 1920, and sold to Italy for scrap
