= Blockade of Montenegro =

Battle during First Balkan War

- Part of the First Balkan War
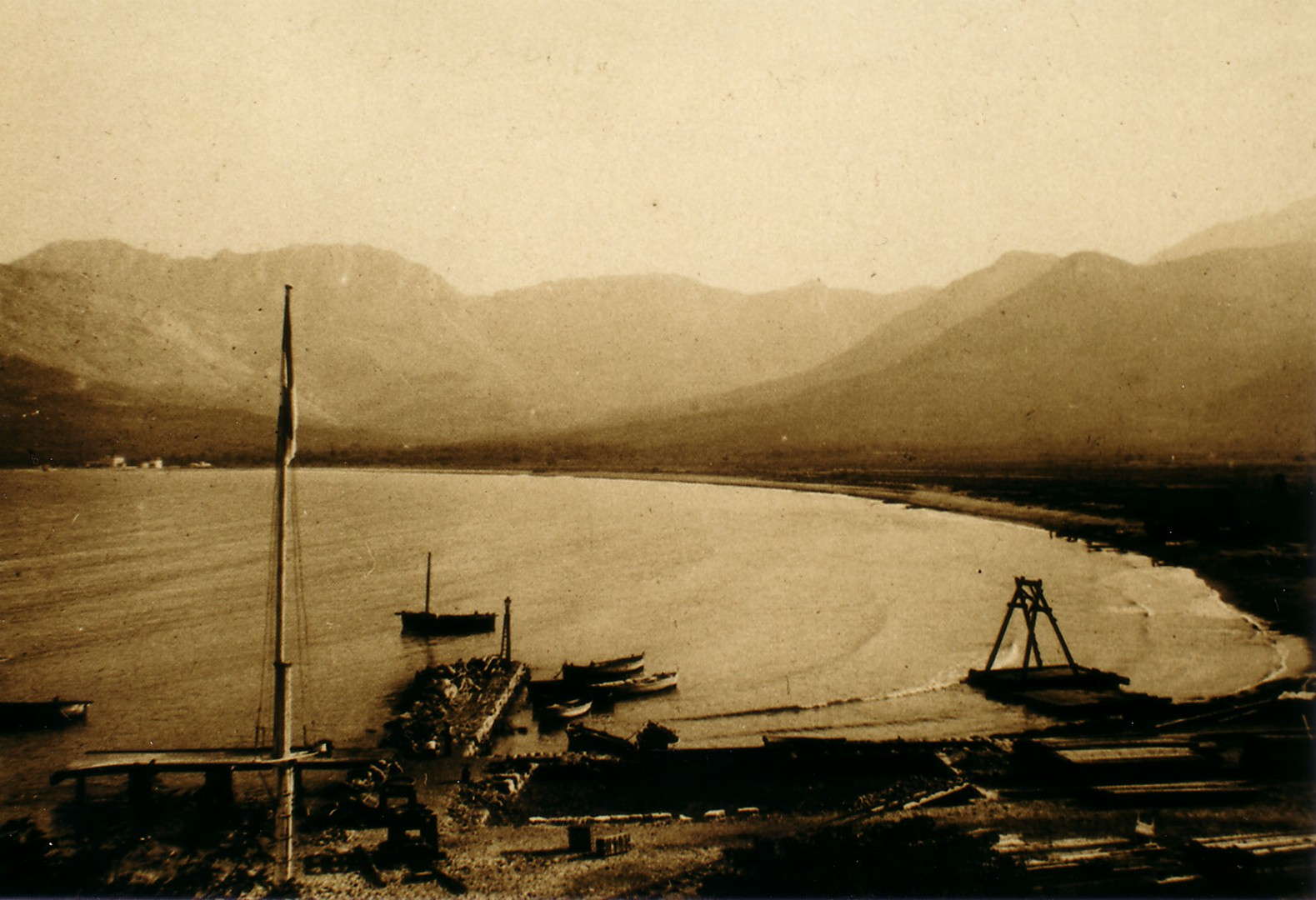
- Port of Bar under construction, c. 1905–1916
Date	10 April – 14 May 1913
Location	Mediterranean sea; Montenegrin-Albanian coast from Bar up to the outlet of the Drin, near Shëngjin (from 23 April up to Durrës)

Belligerents
Montenegro	Austria-Hungary; France; Germany; Italy; United Kingdom

Commanders and leaders
(Kingdom of Montenegro) Nicholas I; (Kingdom of Montenegro) Prince Danilo Petrović; (Kingdom of Montenegro) Prince Peter; (Kingdom of Montenegro) Janko Vukotić; (Kingdom of Montenegro) Radomir Vešović	(United Kingdom of Great Britain and Ireland) Cecil Burney; (Austria-Hungary) Maximilian Njegovan; (Austria-Hungary) Paul Stupar

Strength
	Multi-national naval squadron, including Austrian ships Aspern and Zenta, British ships Dublin and the 3rd Battle Squadron, French ship Edgar Quinet, German ship Breslau, and Italian ship Ammiraglio di Saint Bon

In the Blockade of Montenegro (10 April – 14 May 1913) a multi-national naval squadron summoned by the Great Powers and under the command of Sir Cecil Burney blockaded the Montenegrin ports. The purpose of the blockade was stopping Montenegrin reinforces and supplies from reaching the Albanian coast.

== History ==
During the First Balkan War, the Great Powers decided that the disputed region should be given to the newly independent kingdom of Albania, created as a neutral country under international administration, and they decided to carry out a blockade to reinforce this decision. As Montenegro continued their siege of Scutari, the Great Powers decided to implement the blockade, which was declared on 10 April 1913. The purpose was to prevent Serbian supplies and reinforcements from reaching the Albanian coast. The blockade, consisting of a "multi-national naval squadron", lasted from 10 April until 14 May 1913.

Among the ships involved in the blockade were the Austro-Hungarian SMS Aspern, SMS Erzherzog Franz Ferdinand, SMS Radetzky, SMS Salamander, SMS Zenta and SMS Zrínyi, the British HMS Africa, HMS Britannia, HMS Commonwealth, HMS Dominion, HMS Hibernia, HMS Hindustan, HMS King Edward VII and HMS Zealandia (3rd Battle Squadron), HMS Dublin and HMS Dartmouth, the French Edgar Quinet and Ernest Renan, the German SMS Breslau, and the Italian Ammiraglio di Saint Bon and Francesco Ferruccio.

The block initially extended along the Montenegrin-Albanian coast from Bar (now in Montenegro) up to the outlet of the river Drin, near Shëngjin, in present-day Albania. On 23 April, Burney extended the block up to Durrës in Albania.

Pressured by the international blockade, Serbia withdrew its army from Scutari, which was subsequently occupied by a joint Allied ground force.
