= SMS Aspern =

Protected cruiser of the Austro-Hungarian Navy

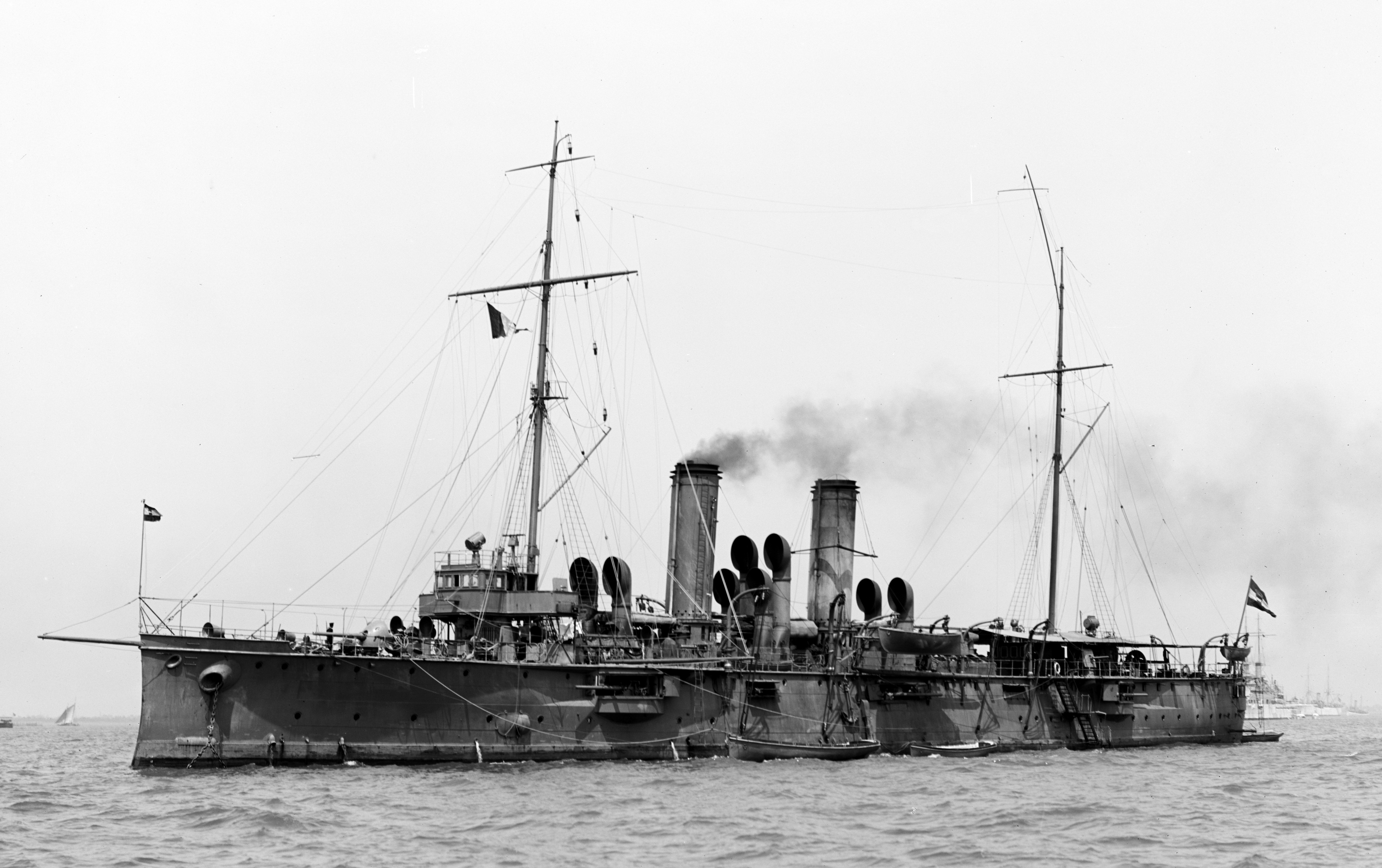
- Aspern during her visit to the United States in 1907

History

Austria-Hungary
- Name: Aspern
- Namesake: Battle of Aspern-Essling
- Builder: Pola Naval Arsenal
- Laid down: 4 October 1897
- Launched: 3 May 1899
- Commissioned: 29 May 1900
- Decommissioned: 14 March 1918
- Fate: Ceded to Britain as a war prize; scrapped in 1920

General characteristics
- Class & type: Zenta-class protected cruiser
- Displacement: Normal: 2,456 t (2,417 long tons); Full load: 2,562 t (2,522 long tons)
- Length: 97.47 m (319 ft 9 in)
- Beam: 11.93 m (39 ft 2 in)
- Draft: 4.5 m (14 ft 9 in)
- Installed power: 8 × Yarrow boilers; 7,200 ihp (5,400 kW)
- Propulsion: 2 × triple-expansion steam engines; 2 × screw propellers
- Sail plan: Brigantine-rigged
- Speed: 20 knots (37 km/h; 23 mph)
- Range: 3,800 nmi (7,000 km; 4,400 mi) at 12 knots (22 km/h; 14 mph)
- Complement: 308
- Armament: 8 × single Škoda 12 cm (4.7 in) guns; 4 × single Škoda 47 mm (1.9 in) guns; 2 × single Hotchkiss 47 mm guns; 2 × single 8 mm (0.31 in) machine guns; 2 × 45 cm (17.7 in) torpedo tubes
- Armor: Deck: 25–50 mm (1–2 in); Conning tower: 50 mm; Casemates: 35 mm (1.4 in)

SMS Aspern was the second of the three Zenta-class protected cruisers built for the Austro-Hungarian Navy in the 1890s. The class included two other vessels, Zenta and Szigetvár. The Zentas were intended to serve as fleet scouts and to guard the battleships against attacks by torpedo boats. They carried a main battery of eight 12 cm (4.7 in) guns manufactured by Škoda; Aspern and her sisters were the first major warships of the Austro-Hungarian fleet to be armed entirely with domestically produced guns. Unlike earlier Austro-Hungarian cruisers, the Zenta class discarded heavy belt armor in favor of a higher top speed.

Aspern spent much of her early career abroad, being sent to join the campaign against the Boxer Rebellion in Qing China in 1900, though by the time she arrived, most of the fighting was over. She remained there until early 1902 when she briefly returned to Austria-Hungary, though she was sent back to Chinese waters later that year. After returning home again in 1904, she served with elements of the main fleet. The ship was sent to represent Austria-Hungary at the Jamestown Exposition in the United States in 1907 and participated in operations in the eastern Mediterranean to protect Europeans living in the Ottoman Empire later in the decade. In 1913, captained by frigate captain Paul Stupar, she was involved in the blockade of Montenegro imposed by the Great Powers during the First Balkan War. She was decommissioned in late 1913.

At the start of World War I in July 1914, the ship was mobilized and assigned to I Cruiser Division. She sortied a number of times to support other cruisers and destroyers that were engaged with enemy vessels, though Aspern never directly engaged them. She bombarded Allied positions on Lovćen in January 1916 to support a successful assault on the mountain. The ship was decommissioned again in 1918, disarmed, and converted into a barracks ship. After the war, she was ceded to the United Kingdom as a war prize and was broken up in Italy in 1920.

== Design ==
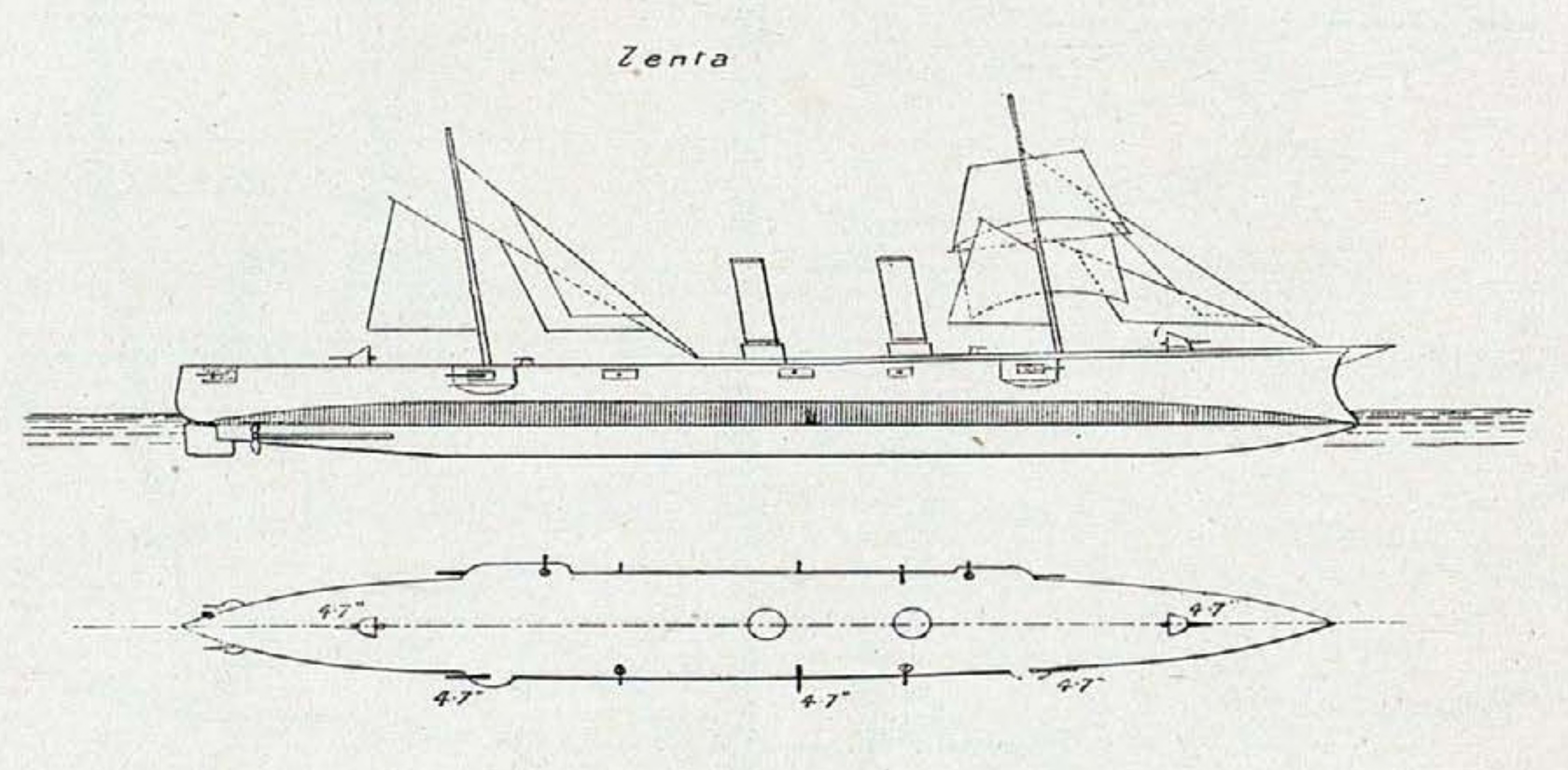
Line-drawing of the Zenta class

In January 1895, the senior officers of the Austro-Hungarian Navy decided to build two types of modern cruisers: large armored cruisers of around 5,900 t (5,800 long tons) and smaller vessels of around 1,700 t (1,700 long tons). The latter were intended to screen the battleships of the main fleet, scouting for enemy vessels and protecting them from torpedo boat attacks. The chief constructor, Josef Kuchinka, prepared the initial design based on specifications that had been issued by the naval command, though by the time his design was finally approved in mid-1897, it had grown in size to around 2,300 long tons (2,300 t). Final approval came after work on the first unit, Zenta, had already begun.

Aspern was 96.4 m (316 ft) long at the waterline and 97.47 m (319 ft 9 in) long overall; she had a beam of 11.93 m (39 ft 2 in) and a draft of 4.5 m (14 ft 9 in). The ship displaced 2,456 t (2,417 long tons) normally and 2,562 t (2,522 long tons) at full load. The crew of the Zentas numbered 308 officers and enlisted men. Their propulsion system consisted of a pair of triple-expansion steam engines, each driving a screw propeller using steam provided by eight coal-fired Yarrow boilers. Their engines were rated to produce 7,200 indicated horsepower (5,400 kW) for a top speed of 21 knots (39 km/h; 24 mph), although Aspern only reached a speed of 20 knots (37 km/h; 23 mph) from her rated horsepower during her sea trials on 2 May 1900. The ships carried enough coal to give them a range of 3,800 nautical miles (7,000 km; 4,400 mi) at 12 knots (22 km/h; 14 mph). To increase their range, the cruisers were fitted with a brigantine-sailing rig of 585.8 square meters (6,305 sq ft) on their two masts.

The Zentas' main battery consisted of eight 40-caliber 12-centimeter (4.7 in) quick-firing guns manufactured by Škoda. One gun was mounted on the upper deck forward, six in casemates in the hull, and the remaining gun was placed on the upper deck aft. They also carried eight 44-caliber 47-millimeter (1.9 in) Škoda guns and two 33-caliber 47 mm Hotchkiss guns for defense against torpedo boats. These guns were all mounted individually, with four in the superstructure and the rest in casemates in the hull. The ships also carried a pair of 8 mm (0.31 in) Salvator-Dormus M1893 machine guns. Their armament was rounded out with a pair of 45 cm (17.7 in) torpedo tubes that were carried in the hull above the waterline. The three Zenta-class cruisers were the first major Austro-Hungarian warships to carry an armament entirely manufactured by Škoda.

The ships' armor deck consisted of two layers of 12.5 mm (0.49 in) steel over the bow and stern. Amidships, where it protected the propulsion machinery spaces, it doubled in thickness to a pair of 25 mm (0.98 in) layers. The casemates for the primary guns had 35 mm (1.4 in) thick sides and the conning tower received two layers of 25 mm plate on the sides. Each of the 120 mm guns was protected by a 45-millimeter (1.8 in) gun shield, although they were not large enough to provide good cover for the gun crews.

== Service history ==
Aspern in Trieste early in her career, c. 1900

The keel for Aspern was laid down at the Pola Arsenal on 4 October 1897 under the contract name "Kreuzer B", also designated Ersatz (replacement) Helgoland for the elderly sloop-of-war. Her completed hull was launched on 3 May 1899 and fitting out was completed by 29 May 1900, when she was commissioned into the fleet at a cost of 4.5 million krone. She was named for the Battle of Aspern-Essling of 1809. After entering service, Aspern joined the Summer Squadron for its annual training maneuvers, which lasted until 21 July. During this period, she served as the flagship of III Division, leading a flotilla of torpedo boats. She was present for a visit by a British squadron to Trieste in July. The ships of III Division were present for the launching of the pre-dreadnought Habsburg in Trieste.

=== Deployments to China, 1900–1904 ===
By this time, the Boxer Rebellion had broken out in Qing China, prompting Austria-Hungary to send Aspern along with the protected cruiser Kaiserin Elisabeth to strengthen the forces of the Eight-Nation Alliance that had assembled to defeat the rebellion. The two ships left Pola on 24 July, transiting the Suez Canal before stopping in Aden, Ottoman Yemen, on 4 August. From there, they crossed to Colombo, British Ceylon, and then proceeded to Singapore, arriving there on 20 August. Aspern then steamed north to British Hong Kong, where she spent several days re-coaling, before arriving at Taku in September, while Kaiserin Elisabeth went to Wusong. At Taku, Aspern joined the armored cruiser Kaiserin und Königin Maria Theresia and Aspern's sister ship Zenta. Aspern stayed there from 7 September until 20 November, though by that time, the fighting had largely subsided. The ship thereafter left to visit Japanese ports where she stayed until late December before returning to China.

Aspern at anchor, date unknown

While Aspern was making her way into Shanghai's harbor on 8 February 1901, the British steam ship SS Macedonia crossed in front of her bow, causing a collision. Luckily for the British vessel, she was not struck by Aspern's ram bow; the latter's bow was badly damaged and her ram was detached. The cruiser was compelled to enter the dry dock in Pudong for repairs to her bow. Divers recovered her ram and repair work lasted from 3 March to 16 April. She entered the Yangtze River on 28 May for a cruise upriver before returning to open waters in early June, spending the next four months patrolling the ports of northern China. In late October, Aspern visited Nagasaki, Japan, for a dry-docking from 21 October to 21 November and remained in Japan for the rest of the year.

At the beginning of 1902 the ship was recalled home and arrived in Hong Kong on 6 January, after which Aspern sailed south to Singapore. Aspern sailed to Penang in the Dutch East Indies and then steamed north to Calcutta, British India, where she arrived on the 27th. She continued on to Colombo, before passing through the Suez Canal at the beginning of March. The cruiser reached home waters on 13 March, stopping first at Lesina before moving to Trieste two days later, and arriving finally in Pola on the 19th. The rest of the year passed uneventfully. From 15 June 1903 to 4 September, Aspern operated with the Summer Squadron as part of II Division. She lay at Fiume from 19 to 24 July before rejoining the squadron in Trieste from 14 to 22 August. The ship was then ordered to return to Chinese waters for another tour abroad.

Aspern departed Pola on 20 September and relieved the armored cruiser Kaiser Karl VI as the station ship in East Asian waters on 2 October. She arrived in Hong Kong on 29 October and spent the next several months visiting various ports in China. On 6 March 1904, she was subordinated to the recently arrived Kaiserin Elisabeth. Her tour of China continued through the year, including another voyage up the Yangtze in June and July. In October, she was once again recalled home, departing Hong Kong on the 15th and passing through the Suez Canal a month later. Aspern reached Pola on 22 November, where she had a wireless set installed.

=== Service in home waters, 1904–1914 ===
The ship served in the Levant Squadron from 1 January 1905 to 31 May, patrolling the Eastern Mediterranean Sea. She left Pola on 1 February for a tour of ports in the region, including Piraeus, Greece, from 5 to 16 February, Salonika, Ottoman Empire, from 20 March to 7 April, among numerous others. She arrived back in Pola on 19 May, but immediately departed for Trieste where she was present for the launching of the pre-dreadnought Erzherzog Ferdinand Max on the 21st. Aspern then went into drydock for modifications, including the relocation of her bow torpedo tube further aft and the installation of a pair of Vickers 37 mm (1.5 in) cannon. Aspern operated with the battleships of I. Heavy Division for exercises from 15 to 20 June 1906. Later that year, she took part in large-scale fleet and amphibious assault maneuvers held at Gravosa from 12 to 15 September, which were observed by Archduke Franz Ferdinand. The exercises concluded with a naval review off Calamotta on 15 September, after which Aspern returned to Pola, where she was placed in reserve five days later.

Aspern at the Jamestown Exposition on 2 May 1907

On 17 March 1907, Aspern was recommissioned for a cruise abroad in company with the armored cruiser Sankt Georg to the United States to take part in the Jamestown Exposition, marking the 300th anniversary of the Jamestown colony, the first permanent English settlement in the Americas. The two cruisers departed Pola on 26 March and stopped in Cagliari, Sardinia, where men who had contracted scarlet fever were disembarked. The vessels then proceeded to Gibraltar, Funchal on the island of Madeira, and Grassy Bay, Bermuda, before arriving in Hampton Roads, Virginia, on 25 April. They remained there through 14 May before steaming north to New York thereafter returning to Hampton Roads. They took part in a fleet review after returning and got underway to return home on 15 June. They stopped in the Azores, Portugal, in late June and then in Algiers, French Algeria, reaching Pola on 10 July. Aspern was assigned to III Division as the flotilla leader from 16 July to 15 September.

Aspern spent the year 1908 in reserve and was reactivated on 27 March 1909 to replace the torpedo cruiser Panther as the station ship in Trieste. On 9 May, part of her crew were sent to participate in a celebration marking the 100th anniversary of the Battle of Aspern. The rest of the year passed uneventfully, and her time as a station ship temporarily came to an end on 28 February 1910, when she was ordered to serve as the flotilla leader for the Torpedo-boat Flotilla, replacing Kaiser Karl VI, which had been sent on a cruise abroad. During this period, Aspern was present for the launch of the pre-dreadnought Zrinyi on 12 April in Trieste. She resumed her station ship duties on 6 May until 15 November, when she was decommissioned for a major overhaul of the ship's propulsion machinery and partial replacement of her boiler tubes. She also had an oven to bake fresh bread installed. Work lasted into 1911, and she remained out of service for the entire year.

Aspern, c. 1912

In early 1912, Aspern was assigned to the Reserve Squadron. She was present at the launching ceremony for the dreadnought battleship Tegetthoff on 20 March. Six days later, she participated in a naval review held in Fasana for the visit of German Kaiser Wilhelm II. Aspern was detached to join I Cruiser Division, which was sent to the Ottoman Empire, from 15 May to 15 August to protect Austro-Hungarian interests during a period of unrest in the country. Further unrest in Ottoman Syria prompted the Austro-Hungarian Navy to send a more powerful force—the battleships Erzherzog Franz Ferdinand, Radetzky, and Zrinyi, the cruisers Aspern and Admiral Spaun, and the destroyers Uskoke and Wildfang—to make a naval demonstration. The fleet left Pola on 5 November and stopped in Beşik Bay at the entrance to the Dardanelles on 7 November, where they waited for two days for authorization to enter the straits and proceed to the Ottoman capital at Constantinople. There, they stayed until 2 December; further riots did not develop, so the fleet was recalled, arriving in Pola on 6 December.

Aspern returned to the shipyard in 1913 to have new wireless equipment installed. During the First Balkan War, an international fleet was composed to blockade Montenegro over its occupation of the port of Scutari. Aspern was sent as part of the Austro-Hungarian contingent, departing Pola on 20 March and arrived off Herceg Novi, Montenegro, the next day. She rotated on and off blockade duty until the end of the war on 30 May. When the Second Balkan War began a month later, she resumed blockade duty until early December when she returned to Pola and was decommissioned on 13 December.

=== World War I ===
Aspern departing Cattaro Bay on 2 August 1916 in company with Warasdiner and Wildfang

Aspern was mobilized at the start of World War I in July 1914, being recommissioned on 31 July and briefly conducting sea trials starting on 21 August before being assigned to I Cruiser Division, which at that time included Sankt Georg, Kaiser Karl VI, Kaiserin und Königin Maria Theresia, and the other two Zenta-class cruisers, under the command of Vice Admiral Paul Fiedler. She got underway on 19 September with a group of torpedo boats for a patrol in the waters off Porozina. The rest of the year passed uneventfully, and on 22 March 1915, Aspern joined Admiral Spaun and the cruisers Novara and Saida for battle training in the Fasana Channel. She then moved to Cattaro Bay, from which she sortied with the destroyers Warasdiner and Turul on 31 March for a patrol that lasted until the following day. On 29 December, the cruiser Helgoland and several destroyers raided Allied shipping to Durazzo, and encountered Allied warships in the First Battle of Durazzo, Aspern sortied with Kaiser Karl VI, Novara, the coastal defense ship Budapest, and several destroyers to cover their withdrawal, though they did not see action.

The ship was present for the attack on Lovćen in early January 1916, providing gunfire support to soldiers fighting their way up the mountain on 8 and 9 January. She also shelled targets at Kovači, Popovic, and Zagora, Montenegro. The attack succeeded and cleared the mountain of Allied observation posts that reported on Austro-Hungarian ship movements. This allowed the Austro-Hungarians to shift I. Cruiser Division further south to Cattaro, where it could more easily raid Allied shipping in the southern Adriatic Sea. At 06:00 on 2 August, Aspern, escorted by a pair of 250t-class torpedo boats, sortied to come to the aid of Warasdiner and Wildfang, which had fought a 45-minute battle with the British cruiser HMS Liverpool, the Italian cruiser Nino Bixio, and several French and Italian destroyers and torpedo boats. The appearance of Aspern and the torpedo boats prompted the Allied ships to disengage, allowing the Austro-Hungarians to return to port.

Aspern unsuccessfully searched for the U-boat U-16 on 21 October after she failed to return on time (the submarine had been sunk four days previously) and covered the return of U-64 on 19 November. At some point in 1917, the ship received a 6.6 cm (2.6 in) L/45 anti-aircraft gun. She participated in shooting practice in Topla Bay near Herceg Novi on 24 July 1917. She departed Cattaro on 28 October and arrived in Pola two days later. On 12 November, she moved to Trieste, where she was visited by Kaiser Karl I on 19 November. On 13 March 1918, Aspern returned to Pola with her sister ship Szigetvár. The next day, both ships were removed from active service to free their crews for use on merchant ships in the Black Sea. Aspern was reduced to a barracks ship for the mine warfare command, supported by the tender Gamma. On 15 March, Aspern was decommissioned and disarmed and she spent the rest of the war in Pola. She was ceded to the United Kingdom as a war prize after the conflict and was sold to ship breakers in Italy in 1920.
