= SMS Szigetvár =

Protected cruiser of the Austro-Hungarian Navy

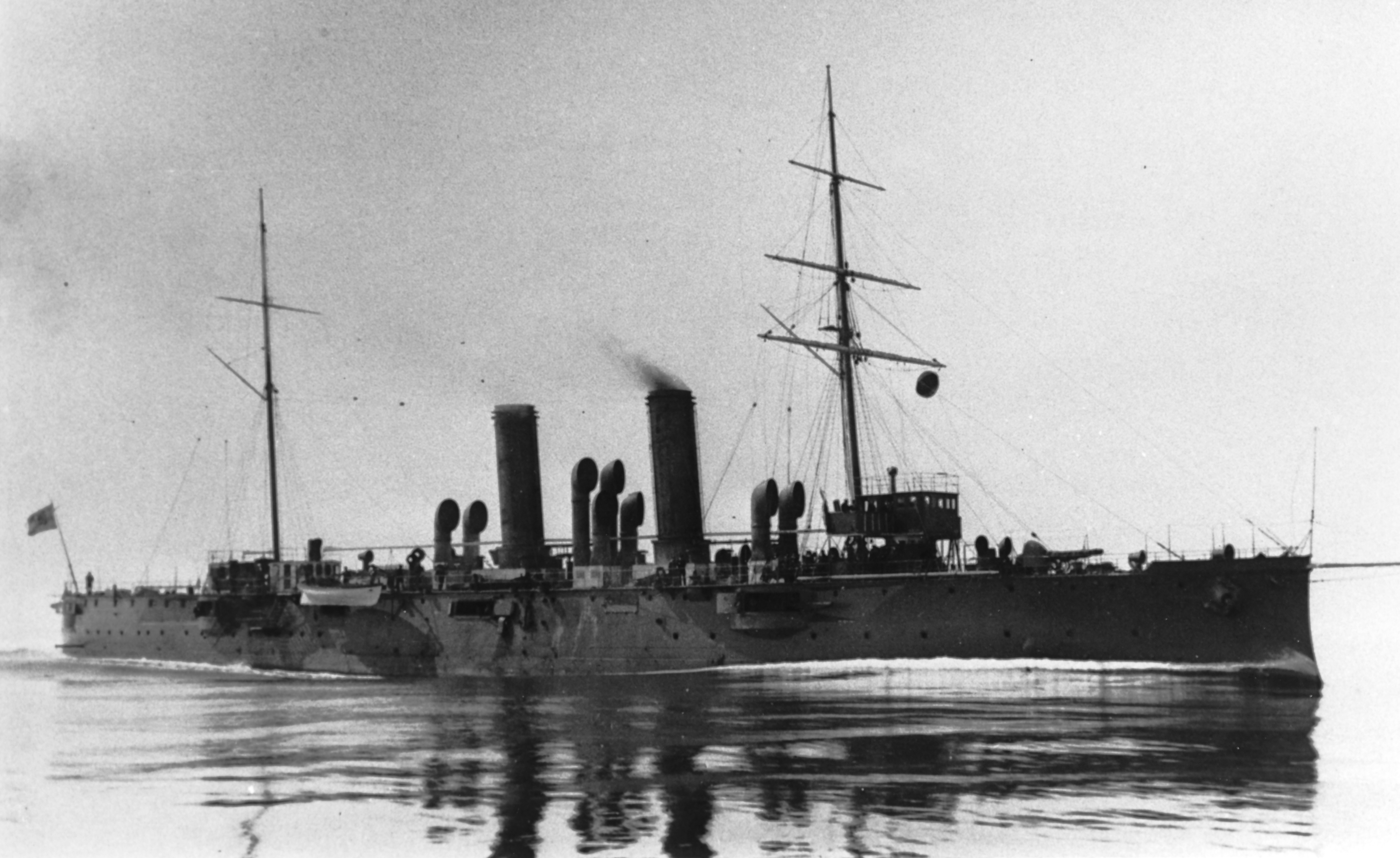
- Szigetvár

History

Austria-Hungary
- Name: Szigetvár
- Namesake: Siege of Szigetvár
- Laid down: 25 May 1899
- Commissioned: 30 September 1901
- Fate: Ceded to Britain as a war prize; Scrapped, 1920

General characteristics
- Class & type: Zenta-class protected cruiser
- Displacement: Normal: 2,350 t (2,313 long tons); Full load: 2,602 t (2,561 long tons)
- Length: 97.88 m (321 ft 2 in)
- Beam: 11.93 m (39 ft 2 in)
- Draft: 4.25 m (13 ft 11 in)
- Installed power: 8 × Yarrow boilers; 7,200 ihp (5,400 kW)
- Propulsion: 2 × triple-expansion steam engines; 2 × screw propellers
- Sail plan: Brigantine-rigged
- Speed: 20 knots (37 km/h; 23 mph)
- Range: 3,800 nmi (7,000 km; 4,400 mi) at 12 knots (22 km/h; 14 mph)
- Complement: 308
- Armament: 8 × single Škoda 12 cm (4.7 in) guns; 4 × single Škoda 47 mm (1.9 in) guns; 2 × single Hotchkiss 47 mm guns; 2 × single 8 mm (0.31 in) machine guns; 2 × 45 cm (17.7 in) torpedo tubes
- Armor: Deck: 25–50 mm (1–2 in); Conning tower: 50 mm; Casemates: 35 mm (1.4 in)

SMS Szigetvár was a protected cruiser of the Zenta class, the third and final member of her class, which was built for the Austro-Hungarian Navy in the late 1890s. The class included two other vessels, Zenta and Aspern. The Zentas were intended to serve as fleet scouts and to guard the battleships against attacks by torpedo boats. They carried a main battery of eight 12 cm (4.7 in) guns manufactured by Škoda; Szigetvár and her sisters were the first major warships of the Austro-Hungarian fleet to be armed entirely with domestically produced guns. Unlike earlier Austro-Hungarian cruisers, the Zenta class discarded heavy belt armor in favor of a higher top speed.

Early in her career, Szigetvár embarked on a major overseas cruise to North America and northern Europe between October 1901 and October 1902. She thereafter served with the main fleet in home waters, where she typically took part in major training maneuvers every year. She also went on voyages to other country in the region, including frequent visits to the Ottoman Empire and Greece. In 1905, she was part of an international naval response to domestic unrest in the Ottoman Empire. The ship carried replacement crews to vessels stationed in East Asia, in 1907 and 1912. Szigetvár was in the Ottoman Empire when the heir to the Austro-Hungarian throne, Archduke Franz Ferdinand, was assassinated, prompting her recall during the July Crisis that led to the start of World War I.

Szigetvár was assigned to I Cruiser Division of the main Austro-Hungarian fleet for most of the war. She took part in bombardments of locations in Montenegro in the early months of the war. Following Italy's entry into the war in May 1915, the Austro-Hungarian fleet, including Szigetvár, sortied to shell targets in Italy, during which Szigetvár screened the fleet and attacked an Italian airship. She took part in further attacks on Italy later that year, including supporting air strikes in December and January 1916. She was reduced to a guard ship in Cattaro Bay in June 1917 before being withdrawn from service in March 1918. She was thereafter used as a barracks ship and a target for the Torpedo Warfare School. After the war, she was ceded to Britain as a war prize and was broken up in 1920.

== Design ==
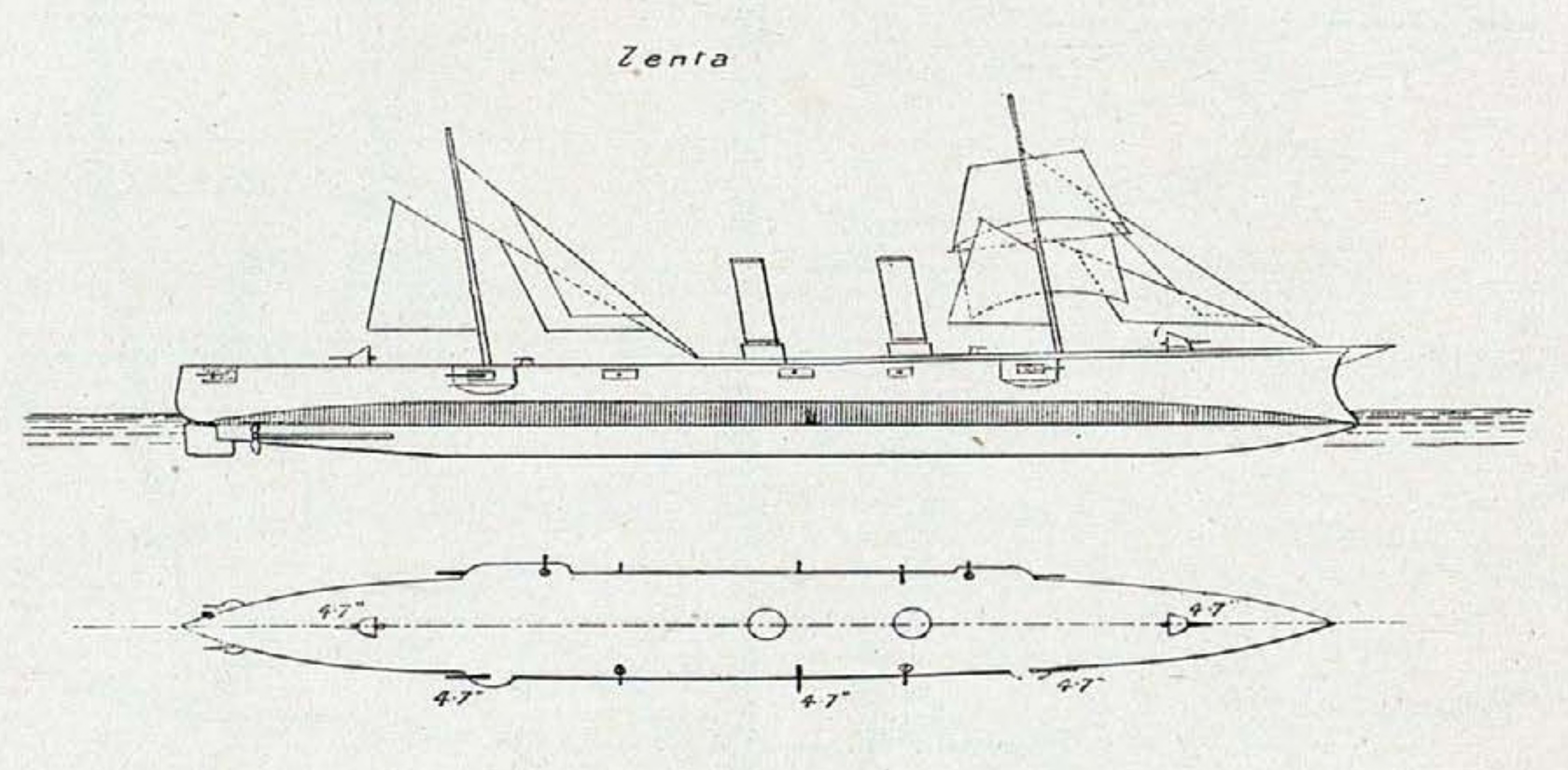
Line-drawing of the Zenta class

In January 1895, the senior officers of the Austro-Hungarian Navy decided to build two types of modern cruisers: large armored cruisers of around 5,900 t (5,800 long tons) and smaller vessels of around 1,700 t (1,700 long tons). The latter were intended to screen the battleships of the main fleet, scouting for enemy vessels and protecting them from torpedo boat attacks. The chief constructor, Josef Kuchinka, prepared the initial design based on specifications that had been issued by the naval command, though by the time his design was finally approved in mid-1897, it had grown in size to around 2,300 t (2,300 long tons). Final approval came after work on the first unit, Zenta, had already begun.

Szigetvár was 96 m (315 ft) long at the waterline and 97.88 m (321 ft 2 in) long overall; she had a beam of 11.93 m (39 ft 2 in) and a draft of 4.25 m (13 ft 11 in). The ship displaced 2,350 t (2,313 long tons) normally and 2,602 t (2,561 long tons) at full load. The crew of the Zentas numbered 308 officers and enlisted men. Their propulsion system consisted of a pair of triple-expansion steam engines, each driving a screw propeller using steam provided by eight coal-fired Yarrow boilers. Their engines were rated to produce 7,200 indicated horsepower (5,400 kW) for a top speed of 21 knots (39 km/h; 24 mph), although Szigetvár reached a speed of 20 knots (37 km/h; 23 mph) from at her designed horsepower during her sea trials. The ships carried enough coal to give them a range of 3,800 nautical miles (7,000 km; 4,400 mi) at 12 knots (22 km/h; 14 mph). To increase their range, the cruisers were fitted with a brigantine-sailing rig of 585.8 square meters (6,305 sq ft) on their two masts.

The Zentas' main battery consisted of eight 40-caliber 12-centimeter (4.7 in) quick-firing guns manufactured by Škoda. One gun was mounted on the upper deck forward, six in casemates in the hull, and the remaining gun was placed on the upper deck aft. They also carried eight 44-caliber 47-millimeter (1.9 in) Škoda guns and two 33-caliber 47 mm Hotchkiss guns for defense against torpedo boats. These guns were all mounted individually, with four in the superstructure and the rest in casemates in the hull. The ships also carried a pair of 8 mm (0.31 in) Salvator-Dormus M1893 machine guns. Their armament was rounded out with a pair of 45 cm (17.7 in) torpedo tubes that were carried in the hull above the waterline. The three Zenta-class cruisers were the first major Austro-Hungarian warships to carry an armament entirely manufactured by Škoda.

The ships' armor deck consisted of two layers of 12.5 mm (0.49 in) steel over the bow and stern. Amidships, where it protected the propulsion machinery spaces, it doubled in thickness to a pair of 25 mm (0.98 in) layers. The casemates for the primary guns had 35 mm (1.4 in) thick sides and the conning tower received two layers of 25 mm plate on the sides. Each of the 120 mm guns was protected by a 45-millimeter (1.8 in) gun shield, although they were not large enough to provide good cover for the gun crews.

== Service history ==
Szigetvár at her launching, 29 October 1900

Szigetvár was laid down at the Pola Arsenal on 25 May 1899 under the contract name Ersatz (Replacement) Fasana, the last member of her class to begin construction. She was launched on 29 October 1900 under the direction of Konteradmiral (Rear Admiral) Johann von Hinke without a ceremony, though she was christened after the 16th-century Siege of Szigetvár. Fitting-out work was completed by September 1901 and she was commissioned on the last day of the month at a cost of 4.5 million krone. The naval command immediately ordered Szigetvár to embark on an overseas training cruise to North American and northern Europe.

=== Overseas cruise ===
The ship departed Pola on 4 October and steamed through the western Mediterranean Sea, stopping in Gibraltar on the way, she then crossed to Tangier, French Morocco, before continuing on to Funchal on the island of Madeira, Portugal. She arrived in Bridgetown, British Barbados, on 1 November and stayed there for a week before beginning a tour of the Caribbean Sea that last for the rest of the year. On 1 January 1902, Szigetvár departed Kingston, Jamaica for ports in the northern Caribbean and the Gulf of Mexico, stopping in Port-au-Prince, Haiti, Santiago de Cuba, Veracruz, Mexico, New Orleans, Pensacola, and Key West in the United States and Havana and Matanzas, Cuba by mid-March.

Szigetvár continued her voyage north, stopping in Charleston, United States, from 7 to 16 March and then steaming to British Bermuda, staying there from 19 to 27 March. She returned to US waters for the next two months, visiting Norfolk, Annapolis, Baltimore, New York City, New Haven, New London, and Boston through early May. She briefly visited Canada, stopping in Halifax, Nova Scotia, before re-crossing the Atlantic. She reached Cherbourg on 22 May and stayed for a week before continuing on to Rotterdam and Amsterdam in the Netherlands. While in the latter port, the ship was present for the launching of the Dutch coastal defense ship HNLMS Hertog Hendrik. Szigetvár arrived in Wilhelmshaven, Germany on 15 June and then visited Hamburg, Germany, on 24 June. From there, she sailed for Spithead, United Kingdom, for the Coronation Review for King Edward VII.

The ship then returned to Kiel for the Kiel Week sailing regatta from 2 to 14 July, during which she was visited by the German Emperor Wilhelm II. Szigetvár then moved to the Baltic Sea, dropping anchor in Danzig, Germany, and then Kronstadt, Russia, where she was visited by Tsar Nicholas II of Russia. The ship next visited Stockholm, Sweden, in August and then Copenhagen, Denmark, later that month before sailing for Marstrand, Sweden, where King Oscar II of Sweden viewed the ship from his yacht Drot. Szigetvár then sailed to Bergen, Norway, then crossed the North Sea to Edinburgh, UK, then steamed south to Brest, France. From there, she proceeded to Lisbon, Portugal, Cádiz, Morocco, and Algiers, French Algeria. She arrived in Gravosa, Austria-Hungary, on 25 September and stayed there through the end of the month before shifting back to Pola on 1 October. Four days later, she was decommissioned for periodic repairs along with a minor modernization that included installation of a wireless telegraphy set.

=== Fleet service ===
==== 1903–1906 ====
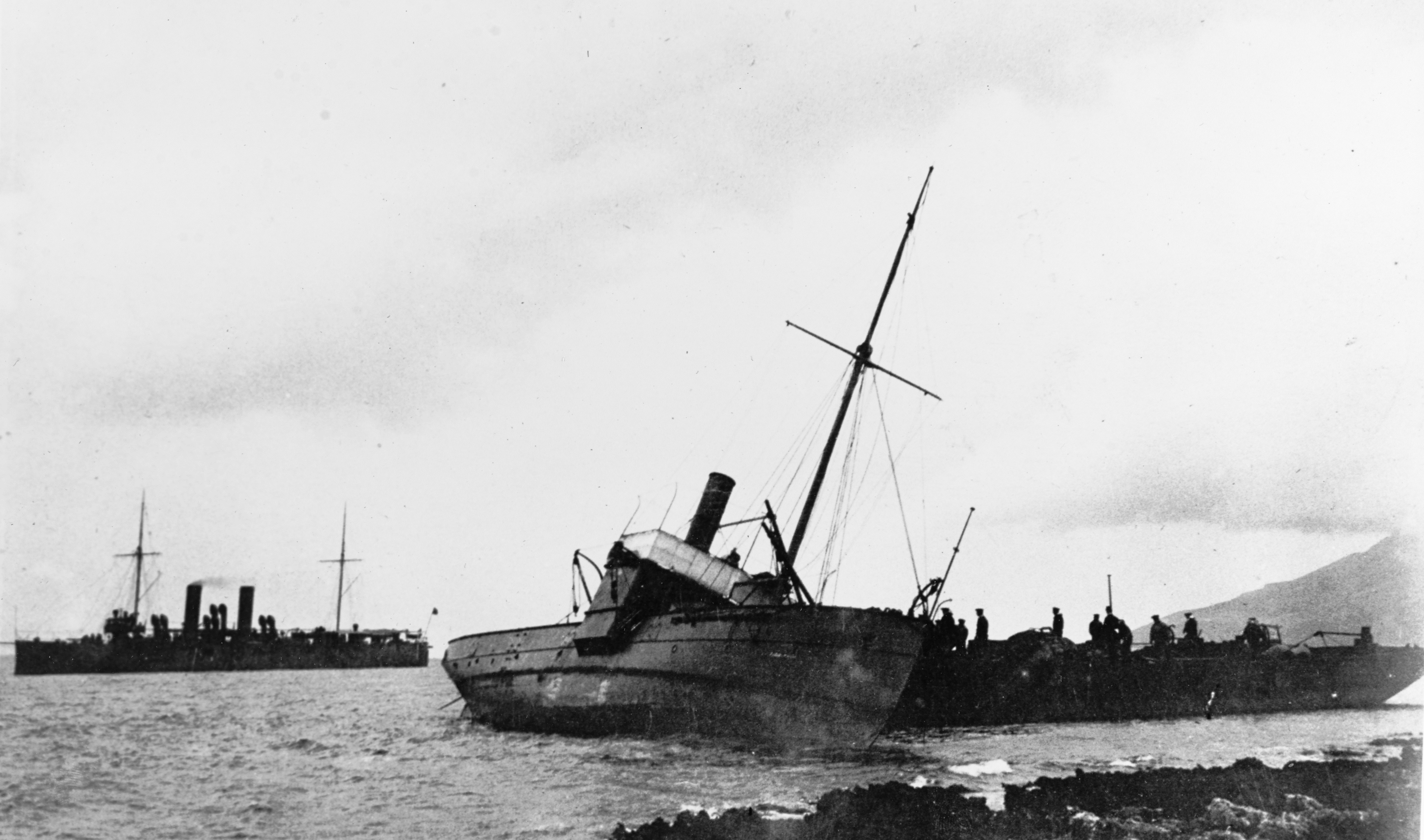
Szigetvár (left) and Magnet (right) with Hippos aground in November 1903

Szigetvár returned to active service in 1903 as a flotilla leader for a group of torpedo boats with the main fleet in home waters. Early that year, Archduke Franz Ferdinand inspected the ship while she was in Gravosa. She operated with the summer training squadron in II Division, with the annual training cycle lasting from 15 June to 15 September. During this period, she visited Fiume from 19 to 24 July and Trieste from 14 to 22 August, the latter in company with the rest of the squadron. The fleet assembled in Pola from 16 to 19 September following the conclusion of the maneuvers, where they were visited by the three Hydra-class ironclads of the Greek Navy. On 30 September, Szigetvár was present at the launching ceremony for the new pre-dreadnought battleship Erzherzog Karl in Trieste. In November, the fleet tug Hippos ran aground on the island of Carbarus; on 16 November, Szigetvár and the torpedo boat Magnet pulled Hippos free.

The ship spent most of 1904 in reserve, during which time she had her wireless equipment rebuilt. On 5 November, she was recommissioned to take the place of the damaged armored cruiser Kaiserin und Königin Maria Theresia in the main fleet. She remained in service with the main fleet through 15 June 1905. During this period, she joined a squadron for a training cruise off the Levant; the ships left Pola on 1 February and stopped at the island of Hydra, Greece. Over the course of the month, Szigetvár toured numerous Greek ports; in April, she moved to the Ottoman Empire, stopping in Salonika, Mudros, Mytilene, and Smyrna, before passing through the Dardanelles to the Ottoman capital at Constantinople in late March. The ship then returned to the Mediterranean, visiting other Greek ports through mid-April. She then began the voyage home, stopping in Argostoli, Greece, and Durazzo in Ottoman Albania, before continuing on to Luka and finally arriving in Pola on 22 April.

On 21 May, Szigetvár and the rest of the squadron steamed to Trieste for the launching of the pre-dreadnought Erzherzog Ferdinand Max. The summer training routine followed from 15 June to 15 September, during which Szigetvár operated with the battleships of I Heavy Division and the armored cruiser Sankt Georg. She was deployed to the Levant in November, departing Pola on the 19th and stopping in Piraeus on the way on 22 November. There, she joined an international fleet that had been assembled to respond to unrest in the Ottoman Empire that threatened foreigners in the country. Szigetvár went to Mytilene, where she landed a detachment of sailors on 26 and 27 November. The men went ashore to protect the telegraph station in the city. The next day, the ship returned to Piraeus, and returned to patrol off Mytilene. The next day, she steamed to Lemnos to take the disabled French destroyer Dard under tow back to Piraeus. From 5 to 12 December, she sent her landing party ashore on Lemnos. The ship returned to Piraeus, thereafter resuming operations off Piraeus through the 17th. The international squadron was dissolved on 18 December, Szigetvár then passed through the Corinth Canal, reuniting with Sankt Georg at Patras; the two cruisers arrived back in Pola two days later.

For the first half of 1906, Szigetvár was assigned to the main fleet's torpedo-boat flotilla. The summer maneuver cycle followed from 15 June to 20 September, and she continued in her role as a flotilla leader. During this period, from 20 to 23 July, the fleet held celebrations of the 40th anniversary of the Battle of Lissa, the Austro-Hungarian Navy's defeat of the larger Italian Regia Marina (Royal Italian Navy) during the Third Italian War of Independence. The next day, the ship ran aground on the Zenizna spit near Šibenik and damaged one of her screws. She was docked in Pola for repairs for four days, after which she returned to the training squadron. She participated in amphibious assault exercises in mid-September at Gravosa. These were observed by Ferdinand, for whom a fleet review was held after the exercises off Calamotta.

==== 1907–1914 ====
The ship was transferred back to I Heavy Division in early 1907, before being tasked with carrying a replacement crew to East Asia for the protected cruiser Kaiser Franz Joseph I. In preparation for the voyage, Szigetvár had her boilers and engines overhauled and her bow torpedo tube was moved aft to free up space that was converted into additional crew spaces and a hospital. She departed Pola on 1 March, passed through the Suez Canal, and stopped to coal in Aden on 12 March, then sailed to Colombo, British Ceylon, where she dropped anchor for several days before continuing on to Singapore, where she arrive on 31 March. Over the following week exchanged the ship exchanged crews with Kaiser Franz Joseph I and loaded a collection of tropical birds for the Tiergarten Schönbrunn. Szigetvár began her return journey on 5 April and finally arriving back in Pola on 7 May. From 15 June to 15 September, she participated in the summer training maneuvers as usual, as part of the torpedo flotilla.

Szigetvár spent 1908 and 1909 out of service in reserve before being recommissioned at the start of 1910 for a tour in the Levant. She departed Pola on 2 January, taking Yo, the new yacht of the Austro-Hungarian ambassador to the Ottoman Empire, in tow to Constantinople. She passed through Kea on 7 January and Syros two days later before arriving at the Dardanelles on 12 January. She left Yo in Sarı Sıĝlar Bay at the Aegean entrance to the Dardanelles, where she replaced the old paddle steamer Taurus, which had until then served as the Austro-Hungarian station ship in the Constantinople. Szigetvár arrived in the Ottoman capital two days later and then steamed to Dedeagac in East Thrace, followed by visits to other ports in the Aegean through late February. On 22 February, she came to the assistance of the Norddeutscher Lloyd steamship Bucovina, which had run aground off Smyrna. Szigetvár visited Smyrna again thereafter, followed by Marmaris in early March, where she met the ships of the Austro-Hungarian Levant Squadron, at that time the three battleships of the Erzherzog Karl class. She continued her tour of ports in the eastern Mediterranean for the next two months before returning to Pola on 1 June. The annual summer training cycle followed from 15 June to 15 September, immediately after which Szigetvár was dry-docked for maintenance. She was then sent back to the Ottoman Empire on 28 September for another stint as the station ship in the country. She was recalled in January 1911, returning home by way of a lengthy tour of Greece that included passage through the Corinth Canal, arriving in Teodo on 28 February.

From 13 March to 7 April, the ship hosted Franz Ferdinand on a trip to the island of Brioni. Szigetvár returned to fleet duties for the summer training cycle, which lasted from 1 June to 31 August that year. During this period, the fleet visited Trieste for the launching of the new dreadnought battleship Viribus Unitis on 24 June. The maneuvers concluded with a simulated amphibious assault in Dalmatia. The ship was thereafter reduced to the Reserve Squadron to have her machinery overhauled in preparation for a voyage to East Asia. She left Pola on 1 January 1912 with a replacement crew for Kaiser Franz Joseph I. Szigetvár passed through the Suez Canal and crossed the Indian Ocean, arriving in Shanghai, China, on 12 February; there, she exchanged crews with Kaiser Franz Joseph I over the next several days. Szigetvár then departed China, retracing her route home and arriving back in Pola on 26 March. The ship was then attached to the naval academy in Šibenik for use as a training ship. She began a training cruise on 12 May, touring ports in Greece for the next month, arriving back in Šibenik on 1 June. She returned to fleet service for the summer training maneuvers between 15 June and 15 August.

New wireless equipment was installed in early 1913, after which she was sent to replace the protected cruiser Kaiserin Elisabeth as the station ship in the Ottoman Empire. She departed Pola on 10 June and arrived in Constantinople five days later before embarking on a tour of Ottoman ports in the Aegean and eastern Mediterranean. These operations continued into early 1914, when she was recalled home; she reached Pola on 28 February. Over the next four months, she alternated between Durazzo, Teodo, Pola, and Cattaro, apart from a brief visit to Smyrna from 22 June to 6 July; while there, Franz Ferdinand was assassinated, leading to the July Crisis and the start of World War I. As Europe drifted to war, the ship sent to Valona, Albania, from 19 to 31 July, by which time war had broken out between Austria-Hungary and Serbia.

=== World War I ===
At the start of the war in late July, Szigetvár was assigned to I Cruiser Division, which at that time included Sankt Georg, Kaiser Karl VI, Kaiserin und Königin Maria Theresia, and the other two Zenta-class cruisers, under the command of Vice Admiral Paul Fiedler. Szigetvár briefly patrolled off Valona on 31 July before returning to Cattaro the next day. She joined Zenta for a bombardment of the radio station in Antivari on 8 August. She conducted another bombardment of enemy positions on the 24th, and on 9 September she sortied in company with the coastal defense ship Monarch and the torpedo cruiser Panther to bombard Budua, Montenegro. On 16 September, Szigetvár again struck targets in Montenegro, at Krstac and Zanjedovo. The next day, she and Monarch returned to Budua, this time escorted by four destroyers and five torpedo boats; they also shelled the radio station at Volovica. The ship saw little activity for the rest of the year, and on 2 April 1915, she left Cattaro for Pola, arriving the next day. She was dry-docked from 9 to 16 April for repairs. She conducted brief sea trials on 22 April.

The Triple Entente had been courting Italy, which had declared neutrality at the start of the conflict, to join the war against her nominal partners in the Triple Alliance. Italy had long sought to seize parts of Austria-Hungary where significant numbers of Italians lived, and the Entente promised these areas in the event of their victory in the war. Italy signed the Treaty of London on 26 April and eight days later formally withdrew from the Triple Alliance, signalling the imminent start of hostilities. The Austro-Hungarian fleet commander, Vizeadmiral (Vice Admiral) Anton Haus, deployed a screen of warships to watch for movements of the Italian fleet. Following Italy's entry into the war against Austria-Hungary on 23 May, the entire Austro-Hungarian fleet sortied that afternoon to attack various targets along the Italian coast, primarily targeting Italian cities and the coastal railroad network. Szigetvár initially accompanied the main fleet to Ancona and was then detached to form a screen with three other cruisers and nine destroyers to warn of a sortie by the Italian fleet, which did not materialize. At around 00:25 on 24 May, Szigetvár shelled the Italian airship M.2 Citta de Ferrara. Szigetvár arrived back in Pola at 11:20 with the rest of the fleet.

On 12 June, archduke Karl inspected the ship. Six days later, she sortied with Sankt Georg and eight torpedo boats for another attack on the Italian coast. Sankt Georg and four of the boats separated to shell a bridge near Rimini while Szigetvár and the other four boats bombarded Colonnella, sinking one freighter during the shelling. The group then re-formed off Rimini, where they sank two motor schooners. The ships arrived back in Pola the next day. Szigetvár covered a pair of air strikes on Ancona, the first on 9 December and the second on 17–18 January 1916. On 21 January, she took part in shell testing, firing twelve shots over the breakwater outside Pola. In late June, a pair of 45 cm torpedo tubes were installed on her upper deck in swivel mounts. She was dry-docked for maintenance again from 9 to 16 May 1917. On 23 May, she moved to Cattaro Bay, where she replaced the old torpedo cruiser Zara, which had until 15 June served as the harbor guard ship.

The ship returned to Pola on 15 November, escorted by three torpedo boats and arriving two days later. That evening, she left Pola for Trieste in company with the destroyer Turul and a torpedo boat, which she reached the next day. On 13 March, Szigetvár returned to Pola with her sister ship Aspern. The next day, both ships were removed from active service to free their crews for use on merchant ships in the Black Sea. Szigetvár was disarmed and converted into a barracks ship and target vessel for the Torpedo Warfare School. She was formally decommissioned on 15 March, and she remained in Pola for the rest of the war, which ended in November. After the war, she was surrendered to Great Britain as a war prize; the British sold her to ship breakers in Italy in 1920.
