= SMS Maros =

River monitor built for the Austro-Hungarian Navy

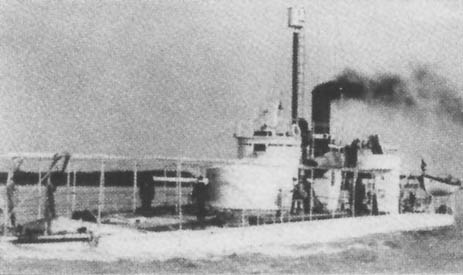
- SMS Maros c. 1915

History

Austria-Hungary
- Name: Maros
- Namesake: Maros river
- Builder: Pest Flumaner Schiffbau, Budapest
- Launched: 20 April 1871
- Commissioned: 13 October 1872
- Out of service: 6 November 1918
- Fate: Transferred to the Hungarian People's Republic

Hungarian People's Republic
- Acquired: 6 November 1918
- Out of service: 31 December 1918
- Fate: Assigned to the Kingdom of Serbs, Croats and Slovenes, 1920

Kingdom of Yugoslavia
- Acquired: 1920
- Fate: Scrapped, January 1921

General characteristics
- Class & type: Leitha-class river monitor
- Displacement: 310 t (310 long tons)
- Length: 50.5 m (165 ft 8 in)
- Beam: 8.65 m (28 ft 5 in)
- Draught: 1.3 m (4 ft 3 in)
- Installed power: 2 boilers; 700 ihp (520 kW)
- Propulsion: 2 screws; 2 double-expansion steam engines
- Speed: 8.3 knots (15.4 km/h; 9.6 mph)
- Armament: As built: 2 × single 15 cm (5.9 in) cannon; 2 × 4-barreled 19 mm (0.7 in) Nordenfelt guns; After 1892: 1 × single 120 mm (4.7 in) gun; 2 × single 47 mm (1.9 in) revolver cannon; 1 × single 8 mm (0.3 in) machine gun; 1915: 1 × single 120 mm gun; 3 × single 66 mm (2.6 in) guns; 2 × 5-barreled 37 mm (1.5 in) revolver cannon; 2 × single 8 mm Schwarzlose machine guns
- Armor: Hull: 44 mm (1.7 in); Turret: 44–51 mm (1.7–2.0 in); Conning tower: 64 mm (2.5 in); Deck: 25 mm (1 in)

Maros was one of two Leitha-class river monitors built for the Austro-Hungarian Navy during the 1870s. Completed in 1872, she participated in the First World War of 1914–1918 and the subsequent Hungarian–Czechoslovak War of 1918–1919.

== Bibliography ==
- Branfill-Cook, Roger (2018). River Gunboats: An Illustrated Encyclopedia. Barnsley, UK: Seaforth Publishing. ISBN 978-1-84832-365-0.
- Dodson, Aidan & Cant, Serena (2020). Spoils of War: The Fate of Enemy Fleets after Two World Wars. Barnsley, UK: Seaforth Publishing. ISBN 978-1-5267-4198-1.
- Freivogel, Zvonimir (2020). Warships of the Royal Yugoslav Navy 1918–1945. Vol. 1. Zagreb, Croatia: Despot Infinitus. ISBN 978-953-8218-72-9.
- Greger, René (1976). Austro-Hungarian Warships of World War I. London: Ian Allan. ISBN 0-7110-0623-7.
