= SMS Salamander (1891) =

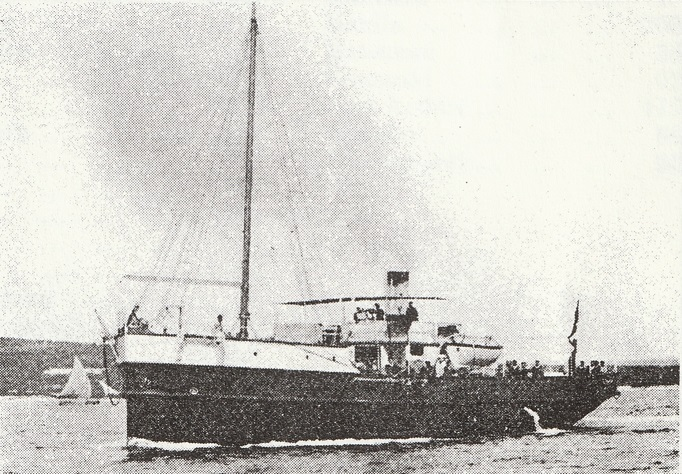
- SMS Salamander

History

Austro-Hungarian Empire
- Name: Salamander
- Namesake: Salamander
- Builder: Stabilimento Tecnico Triestino, Trieste
- Laid down: 1890
- Launched: 9 May 1891
- Fate: Scrapped, 1920

General characteristics (as built)
- Displacement: 265.63 long tons (269.89 t)
- Length: 39.6 m (129 ft 11 in)
- Beam: 8.05 m (26 ft 5 in)
- Draft: 1.5 m (4 ft 11 in)
- Speed: 9.61 knots (17.80 km/h; 11.06 mph)
- Armament: 2 × rapid fire cannons; 70 × upper deck mines; 20 × front room mines

SMS Salamander was a minelayer built for the Austro-Hungarian Navy and launched in 1891.

== History ==
It was the second Austrian ship to be given this name after Salamander (1861), launched in 1861 and scrapped in 1896. The new Salamander displaced about 268 tons.

In July 1891 it was towed to Trieste, and from 1892 to 1893 it was a sea mine school, transporting students from the Austro-Hungarian academy. Between 1897 and 1902 it was assigned to the mine school and also to the telegraph school.

In 1902 it participated in an exhibition at Istria, attended by Emperor Franz Joseph I.

On 10 April 1913, it joined the international Blockade of Montenegro.

In 1914 it was active in the mine shift in the bay of Pola (Pula), later performing the same duty at the bay of Muggia and later still at the Bay of Kotor.

It was at the Farasina Channel early in 1916, and was back at work at the bay of Pola by February. In June of the same year, it laid mines on submarines off Cape Planka, and later in the Lesina Channel and near Curzola (Korčula). In 1916 there was an incident with a mine explosion, causing the death of six men.

In 1917 it fought against submarines at the Bay of Quarnero (Kvarner).

It was transferred to the United Kingdom in 1920 but eventually broke down a few months later in Messina, Italy.
