= Salvator-Dormus M1893 =

Mitrailleuse M1893
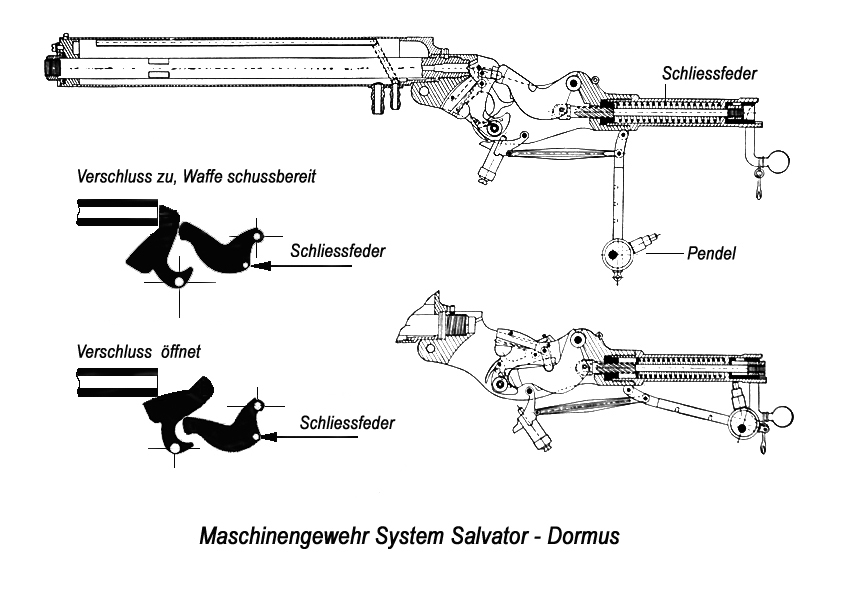
- Type: Heavy machine gun
- Place of origin: Austria-Hungary

Service history
- Used by: Austria-Hungary
- Wars: Boxer Rebellion; World War I

Production history
- Designer: Archduke Karl Salvator of Austria; Georg von Dormus
- Designed: 1893
- Manufacturer: Škoda Works
- Produced: 1893–1918
- Variants: M1893, M1902

Specifications
- Mass: 20 kg (44 lb)
- Barrel length: 530 mm (21 in)
- Cartridge: 8×50mmR
- Action: Hybrid Delayed blowback/Rolling Block
- Rate of fire: 180–250 rounds/min
- Feed system: 20- to 30-round magazine
- Sights: Iron sights

The Salvator-Dormus M1893, also known as the Škoda M1893, was an Austro-Hungarian heavy machine gun designed by Archduke Karl Salvator of Austria and Georg von Dormus and manufactured by Škoda Works in Plzeň. It was chambered for the 8×50mmR Mannlicher cartridge and used a water-cooled barrel and an overhead magazine. The weapon entered production in the 1890s and was later supplemented and replaced in Austro-Hungarian service by newer machine guns, including the Schwarzlose MG M.07/12.

The M1893 incorporated an adjustable mechanism that allowed its cyclic rate of fire to be regulated between approximately 180 and 250 rounds per minute. It was used by Austro-Hungarian forces during the Boxer Rebellion, including during the defence of the Austro-Hungarian legation in Peking in 1900. Contemporary photographs show the weapon mounted on tripods and naval landing carriages, indicating that it was used in more than one mounting configuration.

== See also ==
- List of delayed-blowback firearms
