= SMS Preussischer Adler =

Aviso of the Prussian and German Imperial Navy

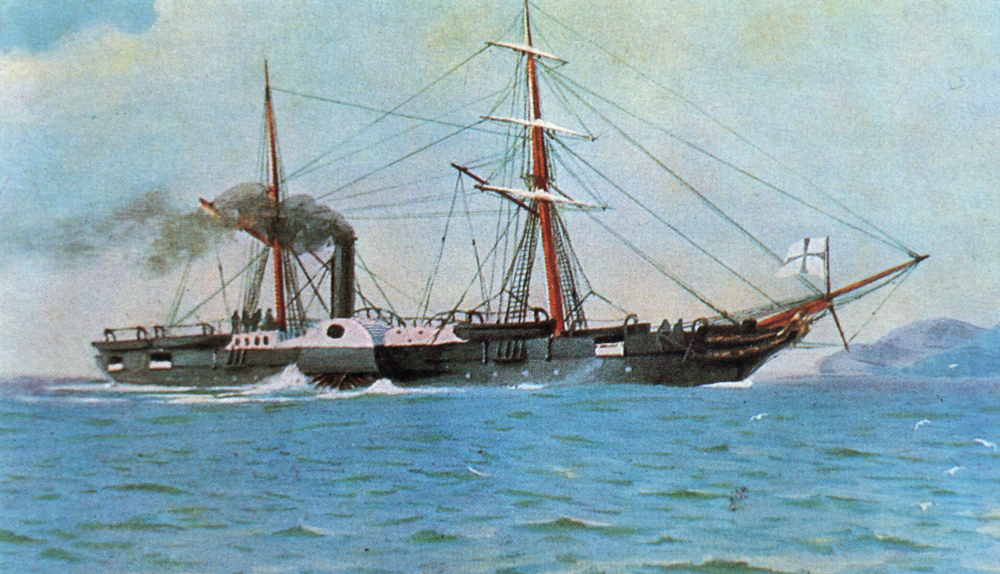
- Painting of Preussischer Adler, by Christopher Rave

Class overview
- Operators: Prussian Navy; Imperial German Navy
- Preceded by: None
- Succeeded by: Nix class
- Completed: 1

History
- Name: Preussischer Adler
- Builder: Ditchburn & Mare, Blackwall, London
- Laid down: 1846
- Launched: 1846
- Decommissioned: 30 April 1877
- Stricken: 27 November 1877
- Fate: Sunk as a target, 26 June 1879

General characteristics (as configured, 1848)
- Type: Aviso
- Displacement: Design: 1,171 t (1,153 long tons); Full load: 1,430 t (1,410 long tons)
- Length: 62.72 m (205 ft 9 in) o/a
- Beam: Hull: 9.6 m (31 ft 6 in); Paddle wheel boxes: 16.2 m (53 ft 2 in)
- Draft: 3.3 m (11 ft)
- Installed power: 3 × boilers; 900 metric horsepower (888 ihp)
- Propulsion: 1 × marine steam engine; 2 × paddle wheels
- Speed: 10.5 knots (19.4 km/h; 12.1 mph)
- Complement: 10 officers; 100 enlisted men
- Armament: 2 × 25-pounder mortars

SMS Preussischer Adler (English: Prussian Eagle) was a paddle steamer originally built in the mid-1840s for use on a packet route between the Kingdom of Prussia and the Russian Empire in the Baltic Sea. She was requisitioned by the Prussian Navy during the First Schleswig War in 1848 and converted into an aviso, the first vessel of the type commissioned by Prussia. During the war, she took part in an inconclusive action with the Danish brig St. Croix, the first naval battle of the Prussian fleet. After the war, she was disarmed and returned to her commercial role, operating uneventfully on the Stettin–St. Petersburg route until 1862, when the expansion of the Prussian Eastern Railway had rendered the maritime route superfluous. The ship was purchased by the Prussian Navy that year and rearmed, once again as an aviso.

Preussischer Adler was sent to the Mediterranean Sea in September 1863 in company with a pair of gunboats, but shortly after they arrived, they were recalled owing to an increase in tension between Prussia and Denmark that resulted in the Second Schleswig War. While on the way back to Prussia, the three ships rendezvoused with a pair of steam frigates from Prussia's ally Austria. The combined squadron attacked a Danish force enforcing a blockade of the German North Sea ports, resulting in the Battle of Heligoland in May 1864. The battle was tactically inconclusive, but the arrival of the Austrian warships forced the Danes to abandon their blockade. Boiler problems kept Preussischer Adler from taking part in subsequent naval operations and she underwent extensive repairs in 1867–1868.

The ship served in a variety of roles in the late 1860s and early 1870s; in 1868, she took a contingent of senior naval officers to observe Russian naval exercises and she assisted with the completion of the ironclad warship SMS König Wilhelm the following year. During the Franco-Prussian War, she served as the flagship of the Prussian squadron in the Baltic Sea in 1870, though she saw no action. Beginning in 1872, she was used alternately as a training ship for engineers and as a fishery protection vessel. In poor condition by 1877, she was decommissioned in April and struck from the naval register in November. She was ultimately sunk as a target ship during experiments with torpedoes in 1879.

== Design ==
Beginning in 1843, the Prussian postal service initiated negotiations with the Russian government to establish a regular line between St. Petersburg and Stettin; the agreement was finalized in 1845, which called for both countries to provide a steamship to service the route. An order for a vessel to meet Prussia's obligation to the project was placed, but the ship built in Britain in 1845 proved to be a failure on initial sea trials and a replacement was ordered from the Ditchburn & Mare shipyard in Blackwall, London the following year. The vessel was named Preussischer Adler, meaning "Prussian eagle", part of the coat of arms of Prussia. The ship was designed by the Prussian Navy's chief designer, Carl Elbertzhagen; the historians Hans Hildebrand, Albert Röhr, and Otto Steinmetz note that records of the initial owner of the vessel have not survived, but Elbertzhagen's involvement suggests it was a state organization, though they point out that the Seehandlungsgesellschaft, the royal merchant shipping organization, had already ceased its shipping operations.

=== Characteristics ===
Preussischer Adler was 56.6 m (185 ft 8 in) long at the waterline and 62.72 m (205 ft 9 in) overall. She had a beam of 9.6 m (31 ft 6 in) over the hull and 16.2 m (53 ft 2 in) over the paddle wheel. Her draft was 3.3 m (11 ft) and she had a designed displacement of 1,171 t (1,153 long tons) and a full-load displacement of 1,430 t (1,410 long tons). Her hull was built with transverse iron frames that provided the internal structure for the iron hull planking and wood decks. The ship had a crew of ten officers and one hundred enlisted men. She carried one large and five small boats of unrecorded types. During her early career as a post steamer, she could carry 168 passengers. Preussischer Adler was a good sea boat, but she maneuvered poorly, being difficult to turn and slow to do so.

Her propulsion system consisted of one horizontal, 2-cylinder, single-expansion marine steam engine that drove a pair of paddle wheels, one on each side of the ship. The wheels were 6.34 m (20 ft 10 in) in diameter, and each wheel had twenty paddles. Steam for the engine was provided by three trunk boilers that were ducted into a single funnel. Her machinery was rated at 900 metric horsepower (888 ihp) for a top speed of 10.5 knots (19.4 km/h; 12.1 mph), but in service she was capable of reaching 11.5 knots (21.3 km/h; 13.2 mph) from 990 metric horsepower (976 ihp). She had a coal storage capacity of 200 t (200 long tons). To supplement the steam engines, the ship carried a topsail schooner rig with a total sail area of 600 m^{2} (6,500 sq ft), though the ship did not perform well under sail.

The ship initially carried no armament. After conversion to an aviso in 1848, she was initially armed with a pair of 25-pounder mortars; the following year, she received two short-barreled 32-pounder guns. When she returned to civil service in 1849, her guns were removed. After resuming naval service in 1862, she received a new armament that consisted of four 36-pounder guns, and after 1867, her armament was revised again, now consisting of four 24-pounder guns, two of which were rifled and two were smoothbores.

== Service history ==
=== Civil career and the First Schleswig War ===
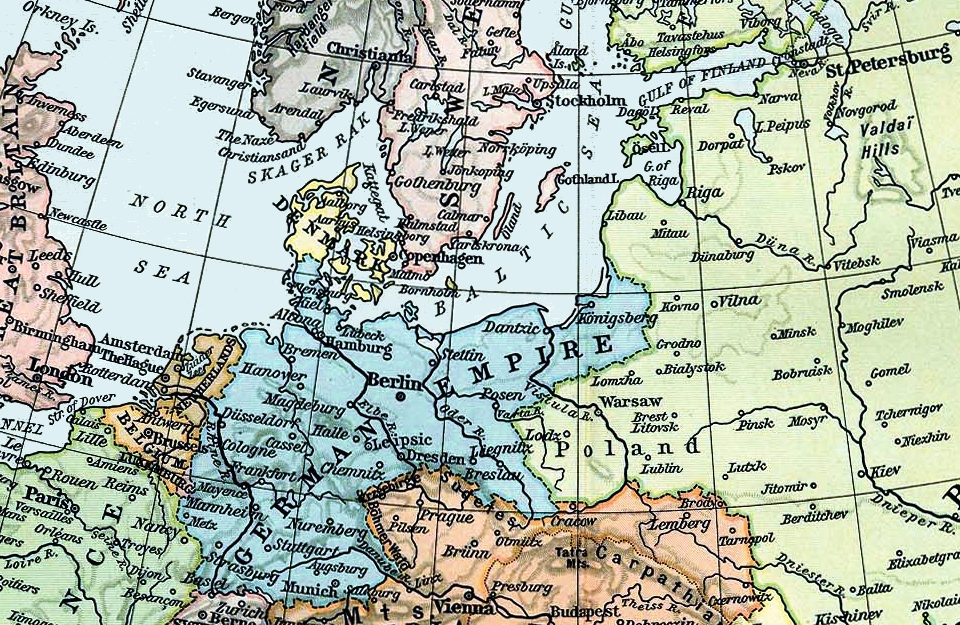
1911 map of the Baltic Sea showing the location of Stettin and St. Petersburg (in the top right corner)

Preussischer Adler was laid down in 1846 and was launched later that year. She entered service in 1847 as a post steamer, operating the route between Stettin and St. Petersburg. During the German revolutions of 1848–1849, the ship was requisitioned by the Prussian Navy for use after the outbreak of the First Schleswig War between the German Confederation and Denmark in March 1848. At the time, the Prussian Navy was effectively powerless to prevent the larger Danish Navy from blockading the German coast; merchant ship owners in various German ports pressured Prussia to arm Preussischer Adler and another post steamer, Königin Elisabeth, but the postmaster general initially refused to turn the vessels over to the navy, since doing so would break international postal treaties. Continued pressure forced the postal service to transfer the vessels, and upon her requisitioning, her deck was reinforced to support the weight of the guns added. While under naval service, the ship carried the prefix "SMS". During this period, from August 1848 to August 1849, the ship was commanded by her civilian captain, Paul Barandon, and she retained her civilian crew. The ship got underway for the first time as an auxiliary warship in August 1848, steaming first from Stettin to Swinemünde; by this time, the Armistice of Malmö had been signed on 26 August, temporarily ending the conflict.

By August, the so-called Fünfzigerausschuss (Committee of the Fifty) of the Frankfurt Parliament became aware that the Prussian fleet had acquired Preussischer Adler; the parliamentarians requested that the Prussians turn the vessel over to the Reichsflotte (Imperial Fleet), but the Prussians refused. Later that month, she assisted with the launching of the gun-yawls Nr. 3 and Nr. 4. With the fighting stopped, the Prussian naval command debated the continued service of Preussischer Adler. The senior naval officers convened a committee on 5 September to evaluate the vessel; since the Russia–Prussia postal line could not be reestablished owing to the uncertain political situation in the Baltic Sea, the navy initially opted to decommission Preussischer Adler. But after Denmark remobilized its forces in February 1849 to resume the conflict with the Duchy of Schleswig, the navy decided to return the ship to active service, and at this time the two 32-pounder guns were added. The ship was recommissioned in May, with Barandon again in command; by this time, he had been inducted into the Prussian Navy and given the rank Leutnant zur See (Lieutenant at Sea). The ship was tasked with protecting German shipping in the area around Stettin from the Danish blockade and preventing Danish warships from attacking the Prussian coast.

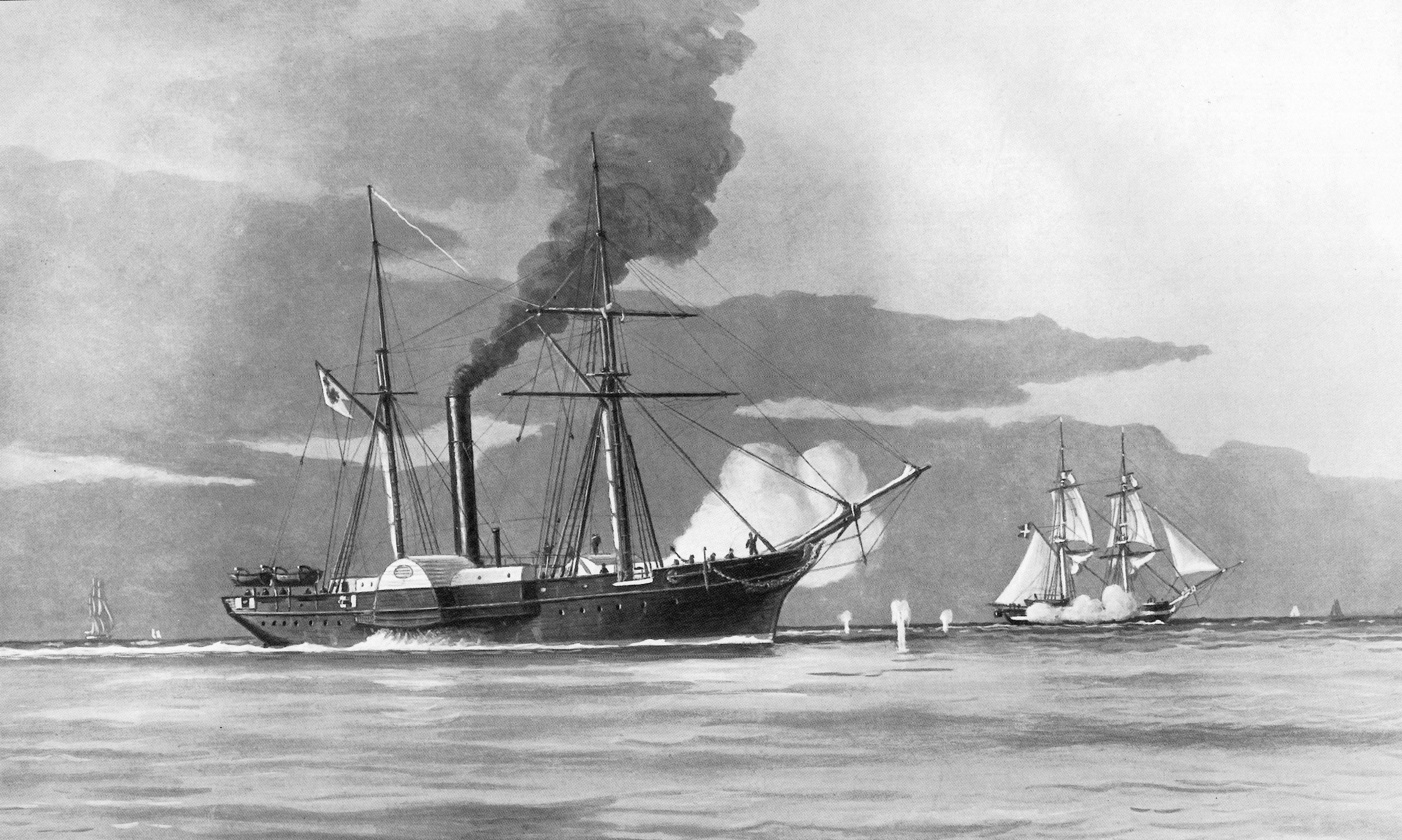
Preussischer Adler in action with the Danish brig St. Croix

While she was conducting shooting practice in the Stettiner Haff on 26 June, the ship received word that a Danish warship was cruising off Swinemünde and had taken two Prussian merchant ships as prizes. Kommodore (Commodore) Jan Schröder came aboard Preussischer Adler, which steamed to Swinemünde to search for the blockade ship. At around 16:00 the next day, she encountered the Danish brig St. Croix off Brüsterort. The two ships engaged in an artillery duel at ranges between 750 and 1,350 m (2,460 and 4,430 ft) that lasted until 21:30; this was the first naval battle of the Prussian Navy after it had been re-established. The Danes fired some 200 shells at the Prussian vessel, which fired 63 shells from her mortars and six 32-pound shells in return. Neither side was significantly damaged in the battle, though Preussischer Adler was hit once by a shell that killed one man, the first battle death of the Prussian fleet.

Preussischer Adler returned to port and received repairs for the shell damage, thereafter returning to Swinemünde in late July. She saw no further action, as a second armistice had been signed, again stopping hostilities. The ship then steamed back to Stettin, where she remained until November, when she was disarmed and returned to the postal service. A long winter prevented the resumption of the St. Petersburg–Stettin route until May 1850. She operated on the route without incident until 1862, when the Prussian Eastern Railway had reached St. Petersburg; the rail line was much faster than Preussischer Adler, rendering the maritime route superfluous and bringing her career as a postal steamer to an end. She once again passed into service with the Prussian Navy, which was at that time searching for vessels to strengthen its fleet. The ship was used to replace the old paddle steamer SMS Danzig, which had recently been decommissioned. Preussischer Adler was commissioned on 18 July and taken to Danzig to be reconstructed for naval service. At this time, she received her armament of 36-pounder guns.

=== Return to naval service ===
Map of Schleswig and Holstein during the Second Schleswig War

The ship was commissioned in June 1863 for a tour abroad; this came after intense debate between elements of the naval command and the administration over the reliability of the ship's steam engines for an extended overseas cruise. Preussischer Adler was to be sent to the eastern Mediterranean Sea along with the gunboats Basilisk and Blitz. At the time, unrest in the Kingdom of Greece threatened German interests and had in 1862 led to the removal of King Otto of Greece, a member of the German House of Wittelsbach, from the Greek throne. Korvettenkapitän (KK—Corvette Captain) Gustav Klatt served as the ship's commander and as the leader of the flotilla during the deployment. A secondary purpose of the cruise was to patrol the mouth of the Danube at Sulina on the Black Sea, a right granted to Prussia and the other European Great Powers (excluding Russia) under the terms of the Treaty of Paris that had ended the Crimean War in 1856.

Preussischer Adler, Basilisk, and Blitz departed Kiel on 19 September and reached Piraeus, Greece on 9 October. From there, they passed through the Dardanelles and Bosporus into the Black Sea to patrol the Danube, but they remained there only briefly before receiving orders to return home on 3 December owing to the rise in tensions between Denmark and the German states. Boiler problems aboard Preussischer Adler, coupled with heavy coal usage, slowed the voyage back to Prussia, and they had only reached Brest, France by 3 February 1864, by which time war had again broken out between Denmark and the German Confederation.

==== Second Schleswig War ====
The Second Schleswig War had resulted from Denmark's November Constitution, passed in 1863, which integrated the duchies of Schleswig, Holstein, and Lauenburg with Denmark, a violation of the London Protocol that had ended the First Schleswig War. The crisis between Denmark and the German Confederation erupted into open conflict on 1 February 1864, after the Prussian and Austrian Empires delivered an ultimatum to Denmark to cede the disputed duchies to Austro-Prussian control. At the time, the Danish fleet was far superior to the Prussian naval forces available, which allowed the Danes to blockade the German coast. To assist the Prussians, the Austrian Navy sent Kommodore Wilhelm von Tegetthoff with the screw frigates Schwarzenberg and Radetzky to break the Danish blockade.

While Tegetthoff's ships were still en route from the Mediterranean, the three Prussian ships remained in Brest for several days owing to the uncertain situation in the North Sea; the Prussians were not certain as to the location of Danish warships in the area and did not want to risk sending the small flotilla into a possible action with superior enemy forces. By 15 February, the Prussians had ascertained that the Danish Navy had sent only the screw frigate Niels Juel into the English Channel, so the naval command ordered Klatt to return home. From Brest, the ships steamed to Cherbourg, France, to replenish coal. They then hugged the coast to avoid contact with Niels Juel and stopped in Den Helder, the Netherlands, on 15 February. There they waited until Tegetthoff's frigates arrived, joining forces to make the last and most dangerous leg of the trip back to Cuxhaven. During this period, the Danes had organized a North Sea Squadron to patrol for German ships in the area. Tegetthoff arrived on 1 May and took command of the Austro-Prussian squadron, which departed for Cuxhaven two days later.

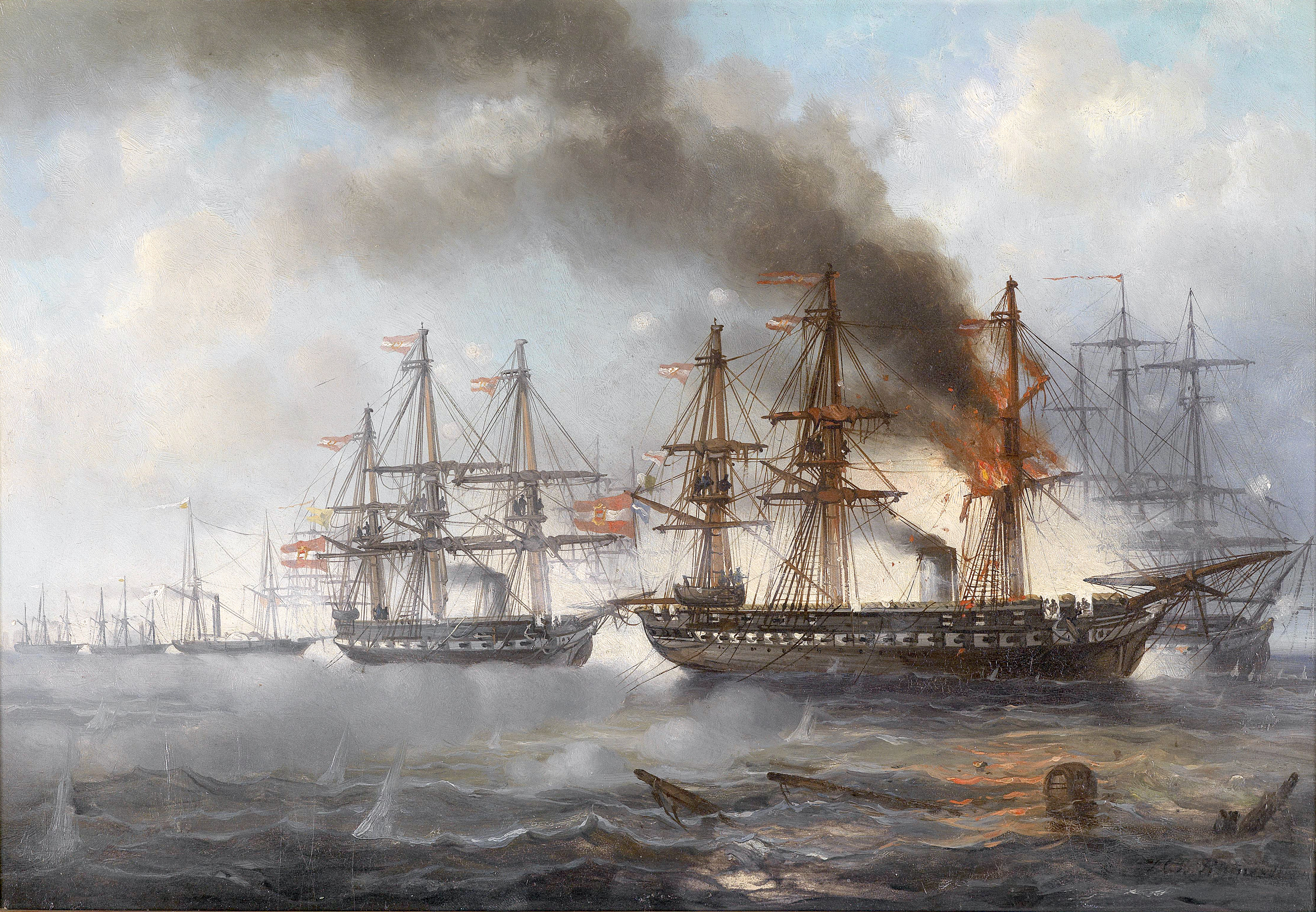
The Battle of Helgoland 1864 by Josef Carl Berthold Püttner; Preussischer Adler is the third vessel from the left

On the morning of 9 May, Tegetthoff learned that a Danish squadron consisting of the steam frigates Niels Juel and Jylland and the corvette Hejmdal were patrolling off the island of Heligoland. Tegetthoff took the five ships under his command out to attack the Danish vessels, resulting in the Battle of Heligoland. Preussischer Adler and the other Prussian ships remained on the disengaged side of the Austrian frigates, taking shots at the Danish vessels when possible, though they had little success. After Schwarzenberg caught fire, Tegetthoff broke off the action and escaped to the neutral waters around Heligoland, where the ships remained until early the next day. During the period off Heligoland, the Prussian vessels sent their doctors to the Austrian frigates to help tend to their wounded. Preussischer Adler had not been hit or suffered any casualties. The next morning, the ships returned to Cuxhaven, with Preussischer Adler carrying many of the wounded to a hospital at Altona. Though the Danish squadron had won a tactical victory at Heligoland, the arrival of Austrian warships in the North Sea forced the Danes to withdraw their blockade.

The day after the battle, both sides agreed to a temporary ceasefire and Preussischer Adler steamed to Hamburg. In June, a second Austrian squadron arrived, which included the ship of the line Kaiser and the armored frigate Don Juan d'Austria under the command of Vizeadmiral (Vice Admiral) Bernhard von Wüllerstorf-Urbair; the now outnumbered Danish fleet remained in port for the rest of the war and did not seek battle with the Austro-Prussian fleet. The combined Austro-Prussian fleet embarked on a campaign to seize the North Frisian Islands; Preussischer Adler was part of the powerful fleet assembled under Wüllerstorf-Urbair for the attack. Due to her boiler problems, she remained in Hamburg during the operations and took no active role in their execution. Austrian and Prussian soldiers crossed over to the islands of Sylt and Föhr on 12 July without naval support, though elements of the fleet provided support to the soldiers as they engaged the defending Danish forces.

The war ended in a Danish defeat with the Treaty of Vienna on 30 October, and thereafter repair work began on Preussischer Adler's troublesome boilers. This work was finished by March 1865 and she was then taken to Danzig, where she was decommissioned for a more thorough overhaul. The project was delayed until October 1867, lasting until February 1868.

==== Later career ====
She was recommissioned on 11 August 1868 to carry a delegation of senior naval officers to visit Russia; she got underway on 20 August with Vizeadmiral Eduard von Jachmann, the director of the Ministry for the Navy, aboard, along with his adjutant, Kapitänleutnant (Captain Lieutenant) Reinhold von Werner, the Chief of Staff for the High Command, Kapitän zur See (KzS—Captain at Sea) Carl Ferdinand Batsch, and the head of the Artillery Department, KK Georg von Schleinitz. They met with Vice Admiral Nikolay Krabbe, the Russian Minister of the Navy and observed Russian naval maneuvers directed by Vice Admiral Grigory Butakov. Preussischer Adler then carried the Prussian officers back to Kiel and immediately took aboard King Wilhelm I, Frederick Francis II, Grand Duke of Mecklenburg-Schwerin, and Carl Scheel-Plessen, the new president of the Province of Schleswig-Holstein. She carried them to the artillery training ship Thetis to observe experiments with torpedoes and naval mines in the Kieler Förde. Since the winter of 1868–1869 was mild, the ship remained in commission into early 1869, albeit with a reduced crew.

On 20 January 1869, Preussischer Adler carried material to be used in completing the new armored frigate König Wilhelm, then being built at the Thames Iron Works in London. She also brought KK Heinrich Köhler, the head of the acceptance commission. Preussischer Adler remained in London at the disposal of the acceptance commission during the final months of work on König Wilhelm and she escorted the ironclad back to Kiel on 4 May. She then went to participate in the ceremonies surrounding the founding of the port of Wilhelmshaven in the Jade Bight, held from 29 May to 22 June. In August and September, she served with the newly formed ironclad squadron for its first exercises. She remained in service until 13 October, when she was decommissioned for the winter. The ship was recommissioned briefly in early 1870 for use as a harbor vessel in Kiel.

She was mobilized after the outbreak of the Franco-Prussian War in July and she served as the flagship of Konteradmiral (Rear Admiral) Eduard Heldt, the commander of the Marinestation der Ostsee (Naval Station of the Baltic Sea). Heldt organized the Ostseestreitkräfte (Baltic Sea Forces) to assist in the defense of Prussia's Baltic coast. Preussischer Adler spent the war at Friedrichsort to observe the minefield that had been laid to protect the Kieler Förde. The French Navy sent a squadron into the Baltic, but poor planning hampered its effectiveness: it possessed no landing forces and few shallow-draft vessels suitable for operations close to shore. As a result, they withdrew on 24 September and Heldt hauled down his flag six days later. After the war, the naval command dissolved the Ostseestreitkräfte on 19 March 1871.

Preussischer Adler initially remained in service as a guard ship in Kiel before being reduced to a tender to the base command. She helped the ironclad Kronprinz tow a new floating dry dock from Swinemünde to Kiel from 29 June to 1 July. At the end of July, she was assigned to I. Shipyard Division to assist with the training of engineers and boiler room personnel. The next month, she carried Prince Friedrich Karl from Flensburg to Heiligenhafen, and in mid-August, the ship was transferred from Kiel to Wilhelmshaven, where she continued to serve as a tender. Prince Adalbert, the Inspector General of the Navy, boarded Preussischer Adler for his last cruise in the North and Baltic Seas in September; at the conclusion of the voyage, the ship returned to Wilhelmshaven, where she was decommissioned.

In April 1872, Preussischer Adler was recommissioned for a new role: fishery protection. At the time, British fishing vessels were encroaching in German waters and had begun attacking German fishers to drive them off, prompting an appeal from Chancellor Otto von Bismarck to the navy to address the problem. Preussischer Adler was tasked with patrolling German waters to expel British vessels illegally fishing. She began these operations on 1 July, replacing Blitz. She was decommissioned again in February 1873 and the next year she resumed training duties for engine and boiler room crews. She served as a fishery protection vessel again in July that year, thereafter seeing short periods in her training role between 1875 and 1877, ultimately being decommissioned for the last time on 30 April 1877. Owing to the poor condition of her hull, she was deleted from the naval register on 27 November. She remained in the fleet's inventory until November 1879, when she was used as a target ship in torpedo experiments. KL Alfred von Tirpitz, the new head of the torpedo department, wanted to test the effectiveness of the weapons on an iron-hulled vessel. She was sunk by two torpedoes from the aviso Zieten in tests conducted on 26 June. During subsequent salvage operations to clear the wreck, the ship's bow ornament was removed and is preserved at the Mürwik Naval School.
