= SMS Radetzky (1854) =

Austrian warship

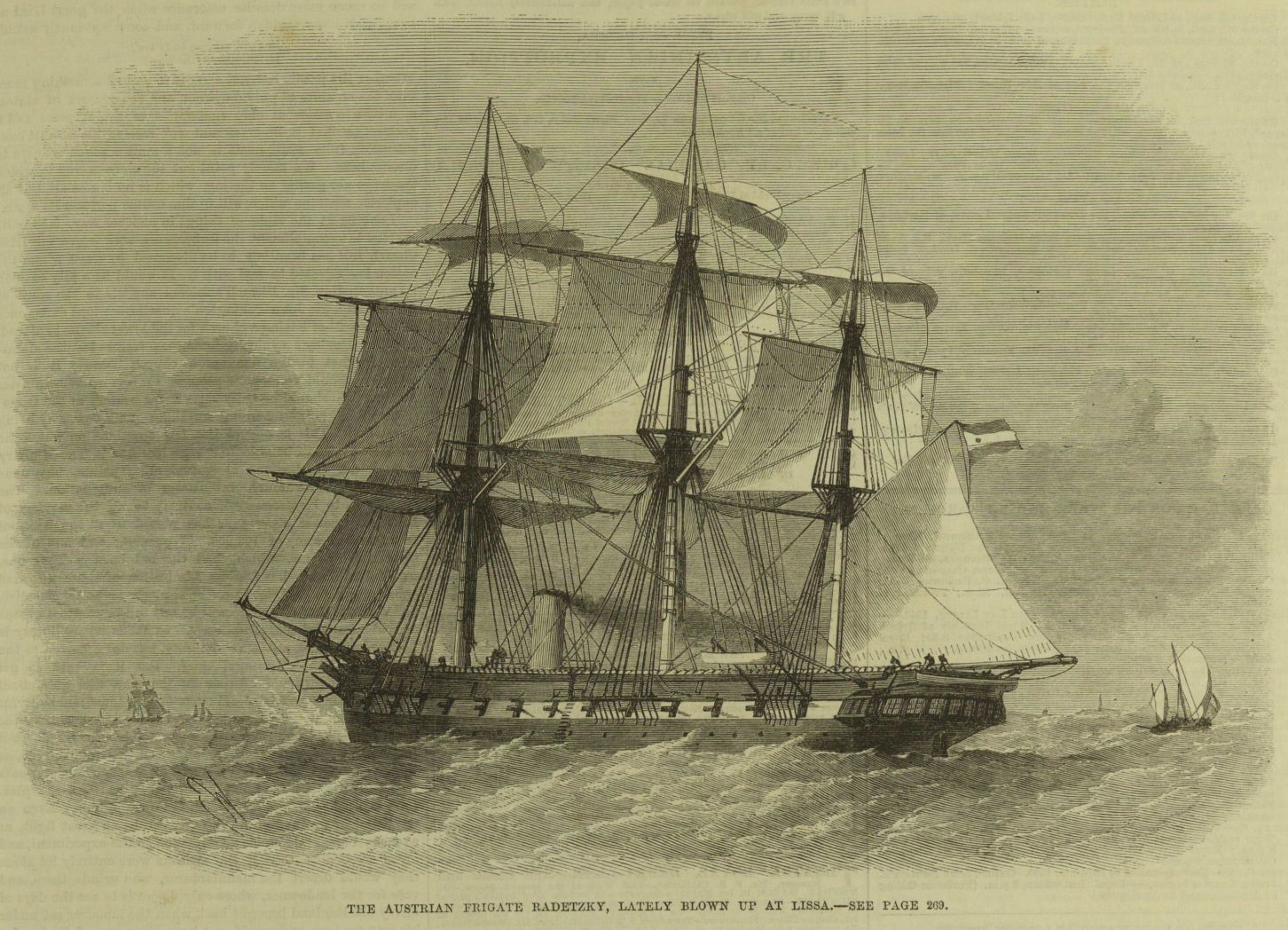
- The Austrian frigate Radetzky

History

Austria-Hungary
- Name: Radetzky
- Namesake: Joseph Radetzky
- Builder: Money Wigram & Sons, Northam
- Laid down: 1852
- Launched: 13 April 1854
- Completed: 1 October 1854
- Fate: Exploded and sank on February 20, 1869

General characteristics
- Class & type: Radetzky-class frigate
- Displacement: 2,234 long tons (2,270 t) (full load)
- Length: 70.62 m (231 ft 8 in) length overall
- Beam: 13.06 m (42 ft 10 in)
- Draft: 5.46 m (17 ft 11 in)
- Installed power: 1,200 ihp (890 kW)
- Propulsion: 1 × marine steam engine; 1 × screw propeller
- Speed: 9 knots (17 km/h; 10 mph)
- Complement: 354
- Armament: 6 × 60-pounder Paixhans guns; 40 × 30-pounder muzzleloading guns; 4 × 24-pounder breechloading guns

SMS Radetzky was a screw frigate in the Austro-Hungarian Navy, built in England in 1856. She was lost after the detonation of her powder magazine in 1869.

== Design ==
Radetzky was the lead ship of the Radetzky class of screw frigates, which were built for the Austro-Hungarian Navy. She was the first screw frigate of the fleet. Radetzky was built in Britain, but the other two members of her class, Adria and Donau, were built in Austria-Hungary.

Radetzky was 70.62 m (231 ft 8 in) long overall, and she had a beam of 13.06 m (42 ft 10 in) and a draft of 5.46 m (17 ft 11 in). The ship had a displacement of 2,234 long tons (2,270 t) at full load. Her crew numbered 354 officers and enlisted sailors as originally built, but this later increased to 398.

The ship was powered by a single 2-cylinder marine steam engine that drove a screw propeller. The number and type of boilers is not known, but smoke from the boilers was vented through a single funnel located forward of amidships, between the fore- and main mast. The propulsion system was capable of generating 1,200 indicated horsepower (890 kW), for a top speed of 9 knots (17 km/h; 10 mph). The ship was fitted with a three-masted sailing rig to supplement the steam engine on long voyages.

Radetzky was armed with a battery of fifty guns as completed. These comprised six 60-pounder Paixhans guns that fired explosive shells, forty 30-pounder muzzleloading (ML) guns of two types, and four 24-pounder breechloading (BL) guns. In 1867, her armament was revised to just thirty-two 30-pounder ML guns, fourteen 24-pounder BL rifled guns, and four 4-pounder guns.

== Service history ==
Radetzky was built by Money Wigram & Sons of London, in their shipyard at Northam, Southampton, and her keel was laid down in 1852. The ship, named after nobleman and field marshal Joseph Radetzky von Radetz, was launched on 13 April 1854. After initial fitting-out in Southampton, the frigate sailed for the Mediterranean, returning to England on 9 August. She subsequently sailed to the River Thames for installation of her 300 nhp engines by Maudslay, Sons and Field, which was completed on 1 October 1854.

In mid-1857, Radetzky, her sister ship Adria, and the screw corvette Erzherzog Friedrich went on a training cruise in the North and Baltic Seas. They stopped in Hamburg; Danzig, Prussia; Copenhagen, Denmark; and Karlskrona, Sweden, but they avoided British and French ports on their way to and from the Baltic, and did not continue on to visit Russia either; all three countries were still resentful of Austria's failure to enter the Crimean War on either the Anglo-French or Russian sides. Nevertheless, it was the first time an Austrian squadron of screw warships operated together outside of home waters.

In early 1859, tensions between Austria and the Kingdom of Sardinia rose significantly, prompting the Austrian government to order the fleet to mobilize in February to be prepared for an attack by the Royal Sardinian Navy. Sardinia had signed a secret alliance with France the month before, and in April, the Second Italian War of Independence began. Though the sizes of the Austrian and Sardinian fleets were roughly equal, the French Navy was far superior, which forced the Austrians to take a defensive posture. Radetzky and the other, modern steam-powered warships concentrated at Pola in the northern Adriatic. They did not sortie to attach the French or Sardinian naval forces, and the war ended quickly after the defeats at Magenta and Solferino in June.

In April 1860, Radetzky was commanded by Fregattenkapitän (Frigate Captain) Wilhelm von Tegetthoff. That year, she operated in the eastern Mediterranean Sea and cruised off the Levant. In late 1862, the head of the Austrian Navy, Archduke Ferdinand Max, offered the sale Radetzky and several other wooden ships in an attempt to acquire funds to build a fleet of ironclad warships, though the proposal came to nothing.

=== Second Schleswig War ===
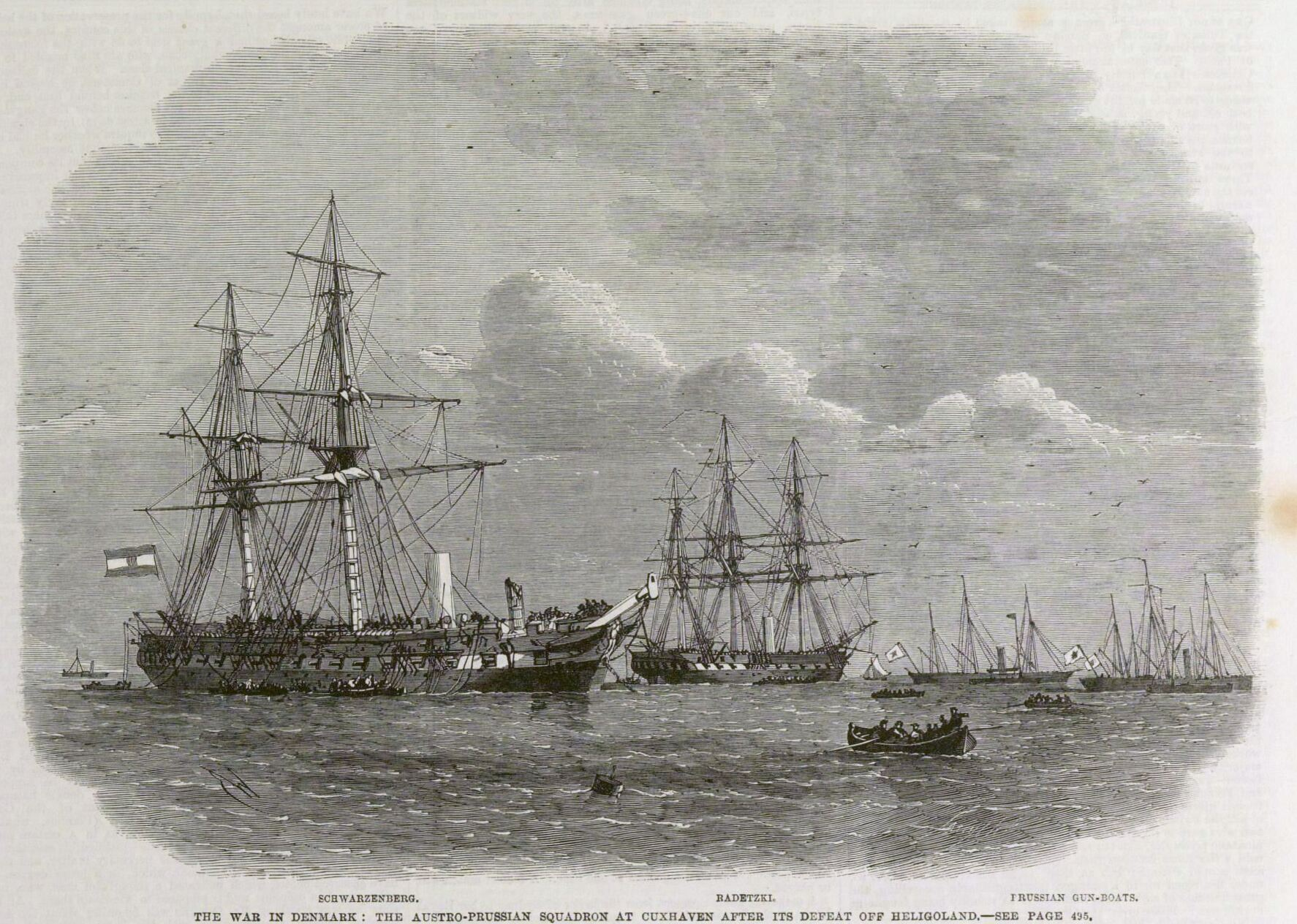
The Austro-Prussian Squadron at Cuxhaven after its Defeat off Heligoland in 1864, Radetzky in the center

The question over whether Denmark or the German Confederation would control Schleswig and Holstein erupted in the Second Schleswig War, which began on 1 February 1864, after the Prussian and Austrian Empires delivered an ultimatum to Denmark to cede the disputed duchies to Austro-Prussian control. At the time, the Danish fleet was far superior to the Prussian naval forces initially available, which allowed the Danes to blockade the German coast. To assist the Prussians, the Austrian Navy sent now-Kommodore (Commodore) Tegetthoff with the screw frigate Schwarzenberg and Radetzky to break the Danish blockade. The Austrian and Prussian squadrons rendezvoused in Texel, the Netherlands, the Prussian vessels came under Tegetthoff's command.

On the morning of 9 May, Tegetthoff learned that a Danish squadron consisting of the steam frigates Niels Juel and Jylland and the corvette Hejmdal were patrolling off the island of Heligoland. Tegetthoff took the five ships under his command out to attack the Danish vessels, resulting in the Battle of Heligoland. In the ensuing action, the Prussian ships were too slow to keep pace with Schwarzenberg and Radetzky, which engaged the Danes alone. After Schwarzenberg caught fire, Tegetthoff broke off the action and escaped to the neutral waters around Heligoland, where the ships remained until early the next day. The next morning, the ships returned to Cuxhaven. Though the Danish squadron had won a tactical victory at Heligoland, the arrival of Austrian warships in the North Sea forced the Danes to withdraw their blockade.

In June, a second Austrian squadron arrived, which included the ship of the line Kaiser and the armored frigate Don Juan d'Austria; the now outnumbered Danish fleet remained in port for the rest of the war and did not seek battle with the Austro-Prussian squadron.

=== Third Italian War of Independence ===
Map showing the disposition of the fleets on 20 July

After the outbreak of the Austro-Prussian War in June 1866, the Austrian Navy began to mobilize, as the conflict quickly widened to include Prussia's ally Italy on 20 June. Tegetthoff, who had by now been promoted to the rank of Kontreadmiral (Rear Admiral) and given command of the fleet, worked to prepare his fleet, which was largely crewed by untrained men. As the fleet made its preparations, the ships carried out extensive practice in the Fasana Channel, which was protected from an Italian attack by naval mines. Radetzky and the other wooden vessels were fitted with iron chains that draped down over the sides of their hulls to give them a degree of protection for the coming fight with Italy's larger fleet of ironclad warships.

On 17 July, the Austrian garrison on the island of Lissa telegraphed that an Italian fleet was in the area and had begun an attack on the island. Tegetthoff initially believed the attack to be a feint to draw his fleet away from Venice and Trieste, but by the 19th, it had become clear that the Italians intended to land on the island. That afternoon, he received permission to sortie and attack the Italian fleet. To offset his fleet's numerical inferiority, particularly in armored warships, Tegetthoff arranged his fleet in three lines abreast, led by the ironclads; Radetzky and the rest of the wooden frigates made up the second echelon, about 900 m (1,000 yd) behind. The second line, led by Kommodore Anton von Petz aboard the screw ship of the line Kaiser, also included Radetzky, her two sisters Adria and Donau, Schwarzenberg, Novara, and the screw corvette Erzherzog Friedrich.

Tegetthoff led his ironclads into the center of the Italian line of battle to initiate a melee, but failed to ram any Italian ships on his first attempt. Petz then took his ships south to attack the Italian wooden frigates, which had failed to answer Persano's orders. Instead, the rearmost division of Italian ironclads turned to engage Petz's ships. Kaiser bore the brunt of the Italian fire, and was badly mauled before the Austrians managed to escape. By that time, Tegetthoff's ironclads had rammed and sunk the Italian ironclad Re d'Italia and inflicted fatal damage on the coastal defense ship Palestro, prompting the Italians to disengage. As the Italians began to withdraw, Tegetthoff took his ships to Lissa to confirm that the Austrian garrison still controlled the island. He then reformed the fleet; Radetzky and the wooden ships formed up on the disengaged side of the line of ironclads. Tegetthoff pursued the retreating Italians, but had no chance of catching the faster Italian vessels. As night began to fall, the opposing fleets disengaged completely, heading for Ancona and Pola, respectively.

=== Loss ===
On 2 February 1869, the ship's powder magazine exploded off the coast of Lissa and she sank. A contemporary report states that out of the complement of 368 men, 345 died in the incident. Erwin Sieche and Ferdinand Bilzer state that 344 men were killed and 24 survived. Following the rediscovery of the wreck in 2014, a memorial service was held, and the names of those who perished are retained in the church on Sveti Klement.
