= SMS Donau (1856) =

History

Austria-Hungary
- Name: Donau
- Builder: Stabilimento Tecnico Triestino, Trieste
- Laid down: May 1855
- Launched: 20 November 1856
- Completed: 1857
- Fate: Broken up, 1872

General characteristics
- Class & type: Radetzky-class frigate
- Displacement: 2,165 long tons (2,200 t) (full load)
- Length: 70.62 m (231 ft 8 in) length overall
- Beam: 13.06 m (42 ft 10 in)
- Draft: 5.46 m (17 ft 11 in)
- Installed power: 1,200 ihp (890 kW)
- Propulsion: 1 × marine steam engine; 1 × screw propeller
- Speed: 9 knots (17 km/h; 10 mph)
- Complement: 354
- Armament: 6 × 60-pounder Paixhans guns; 40 × 30-pounder muzzleloading guns; 4 × 24-pounder breechloading guns

SMS Donau was a screw frigate, the last of the three vessels of the Radetzky class that were built for the Austrian Navy in the 1850s.

== Design ==
In 1852, the Austrian Navy secured funding to acquire its first screw frigate, which was to be built in Britain, as the Austrian shipbuilding industry did not have sufficient experience designing and building steam-powered warships. Two further ships, Adria and Donau, would then be built in domestic shipyards to the same plans.

Donau was 70.62 m (231 ft 8 in) long overall, and she had a beam of 13.06 m (42 ft 10 in) and a draft of 5.46 m (17 ft 11 in). The ship had a displacement of 2,165 long tons (2,200 t) at full load. Her crew numbered 354 officers and enlisted sailors as originally built, but this later increased to 398.

The ship was powered by a single 2-cylinder marine steam engine that drove a screw propeller. The number and type of boilers is not known, but smoke from the boilers was vented through a single funnel located forward of amidships, between the fore- and main mast. The propulsion system was capable of generating 1,200 indicated horsepower (890 kW), for a top speed of 9 knots (17 km/h; 10 mph). The ship was fitted with a three-masted sailing rig to supplement the steam engine on long voyages.

Donau was armed with a battery of fifty guns as completed. These comprised six 60-pounder Paixhans guns that fired explosive shells, forty 30-pounder muzzleloading (ML) guns of two types, and four 24-pounder breechloading (BL) guns. In 1867, her armament was revised to just thirty-two 30-pounder ML guns, fourteen 24-pounder BL rifled guns, and four 4-pounder guns.

== Service history ==
The keel for Donau was laid down at the Stabilimento Tecnico Triestino shipyard in Trieste in May 1855. She was launched on 20 November 1856, and was completed in 1857. In early 1859, tensions between Austria and the Kingdom of Sardinia rose significantly, prompting the Austrian government to order the fleet to mobilize in February to be prepared for an attack by the Royal Sardinian Navy. Sardinia had signed a secret alliance with France the month before, and in April, the Second Italian War of Independence began. Though the sizes of the Austrian and Sardinian fleets were roughly equal, the French Navy was far superior, which forced the Austrians to take a defensive posture. Donau and the other, modern steam-powered warships concentrated at Pola in the northern Adriatic. They did not sortie to attach the French or Sardinian naval forces, and the war ended quickly after the defeats at Magenta and Solferino in June.

=== Third Italian War of Independence ===
Map showing the disposition of the fleets on 20 July

After the outbreak of the Austro-Prussian War in June 1866, the Austrian Navy began to mobilize, as the conflict quickly widened to include Prussia's ally Italy on 20 June. The fleet came under command of Kontreadmiral (Rear Admiral) Wilhelm von Tegetthoff, who worked to prepare his fleet, which was largely crewed by untrained men. As the fleet made its preparations, the ships carried out extensive practice in the Fasana Channel, which was protected from an Italian attack by naval mines. Adria and the other wooden vessels were fitted with iron chains that draped down over the sides of their hulls to give them a degree of protection for the coming fight with Italy's larger fleet of ironclads.

On 17 July, the Austrian garrison on the island of Lissa telegraphed that an Italian fleet was in the area and had begun an attack on the island. Tegetthoff initially believed the attack to be a feint to draw his fleet away from Venice and Trieste, but by the 19th, it had become clear that the Italians intended to land on the island. That afternoon, he received permission to sortie and attack the Italian fleet. To offset his fleet's numerical inferiority, particularly in armored warships, Tegetthoff arranged his fleet in three lines abreast, led by the ironclads. Adria and the rest of the larger wooden ships made up the second echelon, about 900 m (1,000 yd) behind. The second line, led by Kommodore Anton von Petz aboard Kaiser, also included Donau's sister ships, the screw frigates Schwarzenberg and Novara, and the screw corvette Erzherzog Friedrich. The fleet arrived off Lissa on the morning of 20 July, initiating the Battle of Lissa.

Tegetthoff led his ironclads into the center of the Italian line of battle to initiate a melee, but failed to ram any Italian ships on his first attempt. Petz then took his ships south to attack the Italian wooden frigates, which had failed to answer Persano's orders. Instead, the rearmost division of Italian ironclads turned to engage Petz's ships. Kaiser bore the brunt of the Italian fire, and was badly mauled before the Austrians managed to escape. By that time, Tegetthoff's ironclads had rammed and sunk the Italian ironclad Re d'Italia and inflicted fatal damage on the coastal defense ship Palestro, prompting the Italians to disengage. As the Italians began to withdraw, Tegetthoff took his ships to Lissa to confirm that the Austrian garrison still controlled the island. He then reformed the fleet; Radetzky and the wooden ships formed up on the disengaged side of the line of ironclads. Tegetthoff pursued the retreating Italians, but had no chance of catching the faster Italian vessels. As night began to fall, the opposing fleets disengaged completely, heading for Ancona and Pola, respectively.

=== Later career ===
In October 1868, Donau and Erzherzog Friedrich sailed from Trieste on a major voyage to Siam, China, and Japan to negotiate trade treaties with those countries. The trip had been planned for 1866, but the war with Italy had forced a delay. The two ships were commanded by Petz, and they sailed south, around Africa, and then crossed the Indian Ocean on their way to East Asia. They stopped in Bangkok, Siam, before continuing on to China. The ships arrived in Yantai by September 1869, and there Petz traveled overland to Beijing to negotiate with the Qing government. While in China, the two ships replenished their coal bunkers and loaded extra coal in every available space to provide enough fuel to cross the Pacific. From China, they sailed to Yokohama, Japan. Erzherzog Friedrich was badly damaged by a typhoon off Japan in late September and was sent home early; Donau was not significantly damaged, but one man was killed in the storm. Donau, meanwhile, continued on across the Pacific, and while at sea in late November, she was struck by another typhoon that damaged her rigging, destroyed her rudder, and left her badly leaking. The crew deployed a sea anchor to prevent Donau from being wrecked, and then attempted to fit a series of temporary rudders, none of which worked, while a replacement rudder was constructed aboard. By the time the new rudder was ready to be installed, the ship had traveled some 600 nautical miles (1,100 km; 690 mi) with little ability to steer. She then sailed for Honolulu, Hawaii, for repairs.

After arriving in Honolulu on 19 December, Donau was found to require significant repairs, which in turn necessitated the construction of a new sectional dock to carry out the repair work. It was estimated that the project would be complete by late April 1870, so Petz decided to use the time to travel via steamer to Guatemala, Peru, Chile, Argentina, and Uruguay to negotiate trade agreements. Donau was finally ready to depart on 1 May, and by 26 June, she had reached Callao, Peru. There, the crew carried out miscellaneous repairs after their long voyage from Hawaiian waters. Work on the ship was finished by late July, allowing her to depart Callao on 25 July. She sailed south to Valparaíso, Chile, where on 16 August Petz finally returned to the ship. Donau entered the dangerous Strait of Magellan on 14 September, and she was forced to anchor in Fortescue Bay the following night. She remained in Punta Arenas to weather a severe storm in late September, and by 3 October, she had reached Montevideo, Uruguay. Repairs to her boilers and rigging were carried out there, and by 13 December she was underway again. She passed through the Strait of Gibraltar on 4 February 1871, and she stopped in Gibraltar for another series of repairs to her engine and rigging. Donau eventually anchored in Pola on 1 March, having completing a circumnavigation of the globe. Petz left the ship three days later, and on 7 March, she was decommissioned. Donau was struck from the naval register on 1 May 1872 and broken up later that year.
