= Af Klint (disambiguation) =

Af Klint may refer to:

- Erik af Klint (1816–1866), Swedish naval officer, also in the Austrian Navy
- Erik af Klint (1901–1981), Swedish naval officer, nephew of Hilma
- Hilma af Klint (1862–1944), Swedish artist
