= Erik af Klint =

Erik af Klint may refer to:

- Erik af Klint (1732–1812), Swedish navy officer
- Eric af Klint (1813–1877), Swedish army officer
- Erik af Klint (1816–1866), Swedish navy officer
- Erik af Klint (1901–1981), Swedish navy officer
