= SMS Schwarzenberg =

- Sketch of Schwarzenberg, probably in her original configuration

Class overview
- Operators: Austro-Hungarian Navy
- Preceded by: SMS Novara
- Succeeded by: Radetzky class

History
- Name: Schwarzenberg
- Builder: Venetian Arsenal, Venice
- Laid down: 1851
- Launched: 23 April 1853
- Completed: 1854
- Stricken: 20 November 1890

General characteristics (1862 Refit)
- Type: Screw frigate
- Displacement: 2,614 long tons (2,656 t) (full load)
- Length: 74 m (242 ft 9 in) length overall
- Beam: 14.88 m (48 ft 10 in)
- Draft: 6.5 m (21 ft 4 in)
- Installed power: 1,700 ihp (1,300 kW)
- Propulsion: 1 × marine steam engine; 1 × screw propeller
- Speed: 11 knots (20 km/h; 13 mph)
- Complement: 547
- Armament: 6 × 60-pounder Paixhans guns; 40 × 30-pounder muzzleloading guns; 4 × 24-pounder breechloading guns

SMS Schwarzenberg was a frigate of the Austrian Navy, built in the 1850s, the only member of her ship class. She was converted into a screw frigate in the early 1860s. Schwarzenberg saw significant action during her career, leading the Austro-Prussian squadron at the Battle of Heligoland in the 1864 Second Schleswig War and participating in the Battle of Lissa during the Third Italian War of Independence.

== Design ==
Schwarzenberg was 64.4 m (211 ft 3 in) long between perpendiculars and 74 m (242 ft 9 in) long overall. She had a beam of 14.88 m (48 ft 10 in) and a draft of 6.5 m (21 ft 4 in). The ship had a displacement of 2,614 long tons (2,656 t). Her crew numbered 547 officers and enlisted sailors. As built, she was fitted with a three-masted ship rig.

In 1862, the ship was heavily modified for steam propulsion. She had a single 2-cylinder marine steam engine installed, which drove a screw propeller. The engine was manufactured by the Stabilimento Tecnico di Fiume firm of Fiume. The number and type of boilers is not known, but smoke from the boilers was vented through a single funnel located forward of amidships, between the fore- and main mast. The propulsion system was capable of generating 1,700 indicated horsepower (1,300 kW), for a top speed of 11 knots (20 km/h; 13 mph). She retained her sailing rig to supplement the steam engine on long voyages.

By the refit, her armament consisted of a battery of fifty guns as completed. These comprised six 60-pounder Paixhans guns that fired explosive shells, forty 30-pounder muzzleloading (ML) guns of two types, and four 24-pounder breechloading (BL) guns. In 1866, four of the 30-pounder guns were removed.

== Service history ==
The keel for Schwarzenberg was laid down at the Venetian Arsenal in 1851. She was launched on 23 April 1853, and was completed the following year.

In 1862, the head of the Austrian Navy, Archduke Ferdinand Max, argued for a major construction program as part of the Austro-Italian ironclad arms race. In addition to three new ironclad warships, he requested the conversion of Schwarzenberg and Novara from sail to steam frigates. The Austrian Reichsrat (Imperial Council) refused to grant funding for the program, but Kaiser Franz Joseph intervened and authorized the navy to place orders for the work anyway. After returning to service, Schwarzenberg, the screw frigate Radetzky, and the gunboat Seehund were deployed to Greek waters in 1863 during a period of instability in the country resulting from the expulsion of Otto of Greece. Later that year, after Otto formally abdicated, the Austrian ships were sent to patrol the coast of the Levant.

=== Second Schleswig War ===
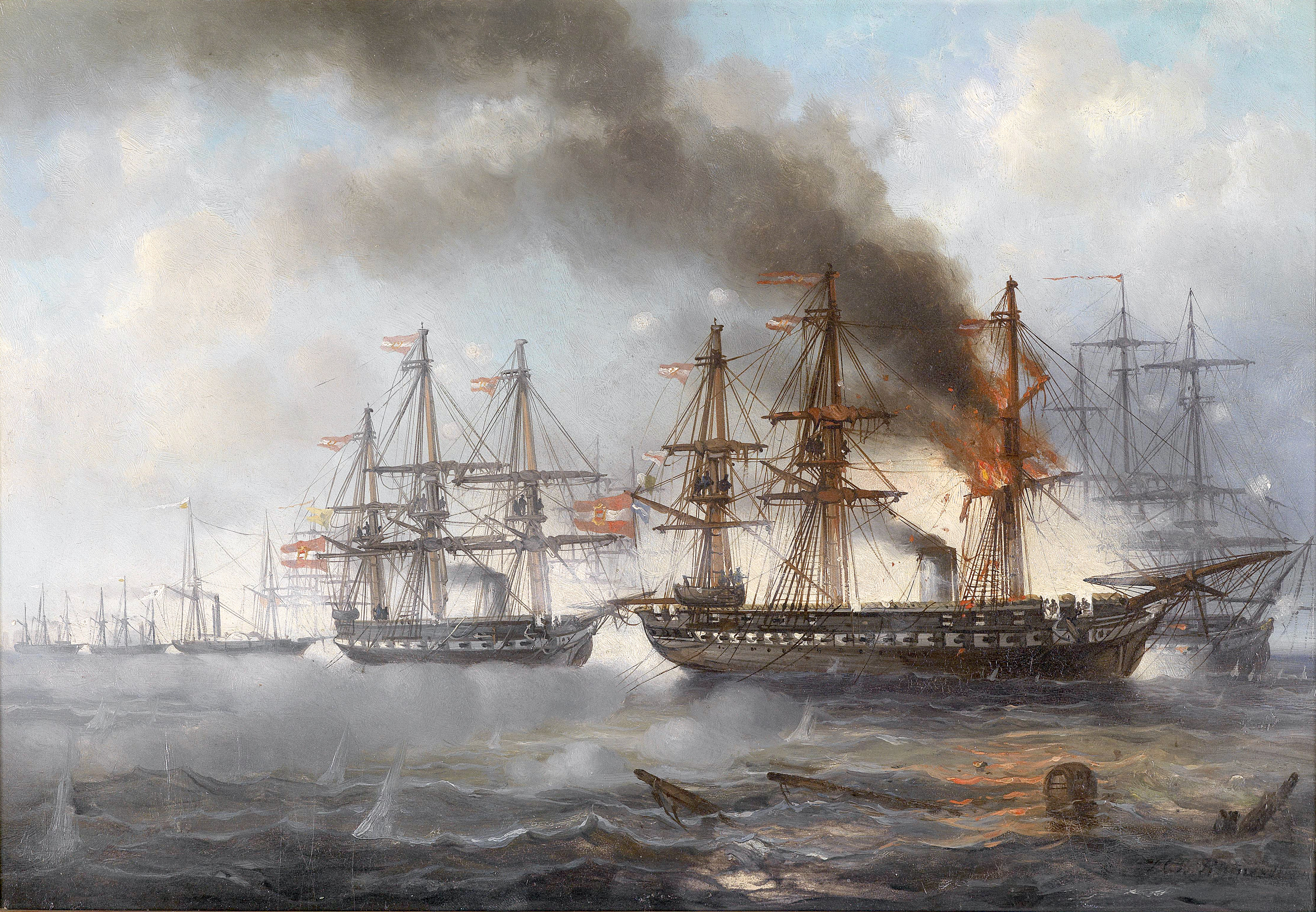
Schwarzenberg (right, afire) with Radetzky and the Prussian vessels astern in action at the Battle of Heligoland

The question over whether Denmark or the German Confederation would control Schleswig and Holstein erupted in the Second Schleswig War, which began on 1 February 1864, after the Prussian and Austrian Empires delivered an ultimatum to Denmark to cede the disputed duchies to Austro-Prussian control. At the time, the Danish fleet was far superior to the Prussian naval forces initially available, which allowed the Danes to blockade the German coast. To assist the Prussians, the Austrian Navy sent Kommodore (Commodore) Wilhelm von Tegetthoff with Schwarzenberg, Radetzky, and Seehund to break the Danish blockade, as these ships were still at sea in the Levant, and thus were ready to sail. A larger squadron was being assembled in Pola, and it was hoped that they would be ready to meet Tegetthoff's ships at the mouth of the Adriatic Sea, but they were not, so Tegetthoff sailed ahead without them. While stopping in Britain, Seehund was damaged in an accident, and so she had to be left behind. The Austrian and Prussian squadrons rendezvoused in Texel, the Netherlands, the Prussian vessels came under Tegetthoff's command.

On the morning of 9 May, Tegetthoff learned that a Danish squadron consisting of the steam frigates Niels Juel and Jylland and the corvette Hejmdal were patrolling off the island of Heligoland. Tegetthoff took the five ships under his command out to attack the Danish vessels, resulting in the Battle of Heligoland. In the ensuing action, the Prussian ships were too slow to keep pace with Schwarzenberg and Radetzky, which engaged the Danes alone. After Schwarzenberg caught fire, Tegetthoff broke off the action and escaped to the neutral waters around Heligoland, where the ships remained until early the next day. The next morning, the ships returned to Cuxhaven. Though the Danish squadron had won a tactical victory at Heligoland, the arrival of Austrian warships in the North Sea forced the Danes to withdraw their blockade.

In June, the second Austrian squadron arrived, which included the ship of the line Kaiser and the armored frigate Don Juan d'Austria; the now outnumbered Danish fleet remained in port for the rest of the war and did not seek battle with the Austro-Prussian squadron. The war ended in an armistice the following month. The bulk of the Austrian fleet withdrew after the war ended, including Schwarzenberg.

=== Third Italian War of Independence ===
Map showing the disposition of the fleets on 20 July

After the outbreak of the Austro-Prussian War in June 1866, the Austrian Navy began to mobilize, as the conflict quickly widened to include Prussia's ally Italy on 20 June. Tegetthoff, who had by now been promoted to the rank of Kontreadmiral (Rear Admiral) and given command of the fleet, worked to prepare his fleet, which was largely crewed by untrained men. As the fleet made its preparations, the ships carried out extensive practice in the Fasana Channel, which was protected from an Italian attack by naval mines. Schwarzenberg and the other wooden vessels were fitted with iron chains that draped down over the sides of their hulls to give them a degree of protection for the coming fight with Italy's larger fleet of ironclad warships.

On 17 July, the Austrian garrison on the island of Lissa telegraphed that an Italian fleet was in the area and had begun an attack on the island. Tegetthoff initially believed the attack to be a feint to draw his fleet away from Venice and Trieste, but by the 19th, it had become clear that the Italians intended to land on the island. That afternoon, he received permission to sortie and attack the Italian fleet. To offset his fleet's numerical inferiority, particularly in armored warships, Tegetthoff arranged his fleet in three lines abreast, led by the ironclads; Schwarzenberg and the rest of the larger wooden vessels made up the second echelon, about 900 m (1,000 yd) behind. The second line, led by Kommodore Anton von Petz aboard the screw ship of the line Kaiser, also included the screw frigates Radetzky, Adria, Donau, Novara, and the screw corvette Erzherzog Friedrich.

Tegetthoff led his ironclads into the center of the Italian line of battle to initiate a melee, but failed to ram any Italian ships on his first attempt. Petz then took his ships south to attack the Italian wooden frigates, which had failed to answer Persano's orders. Instead, the rearmost division of Italian ironclads turned to engage Petz's ships. Kaiser bore the brunt of the Italian fire, and was badly mauled before the Austrians managed to escape. By that time, Tegetthoff's ironclads had rammed and sunk the Italian ironclad Re d'Italia and inflicted fatal damage on the coastal defense ship Palestro, prompting the Italians to disengage. As the Italians began to withdraw, Tegetthoff took his ships to Lissa to confirm that the Austrian garrison still controlled the island. He then reformed the fleet; Schwarzenberg and the wooden ships formed up on the disengaged side of the line of ironclads. Tegetthoff pursued the retreating Italians, but had no chance of catching the faster Italian vessels. As night began to fall, the opposing fleets disengaged completely, heading for Ancona and Pola, respectively.

=== Later career ===
After the war, Tegetthoff became the commander of what was now the Austro-Hungarian Navy. Over the course of 1868, he instituted a series of reforms to improve efficiency in the fleet, which included removing Schwarzenberg and Adria from active status, as they were no longer particularly seaworthy. Schwarzenberg was decommissioned in 1869, and she became a training ship for naval cadets, replacing the old sailing frigate Venus in that role; as Schwarzenberg was significantly larger, she was able to train more cadets every cycle. In March 1871, short training cruises from Pola began; first-year cadets generally went to sea one day per week, while those in their second year at the academy usually saw three or four days a week at sea. The ship was supported by the old schooner Arthemisia. The two ships operated together again in the 1872 training year, which saw more than 300 cadets trained, more than two-thirds of which went to sea aboard Schwarzenberg. The old schooner Camaeleon joined Schwarzenberg and Arthemisia in 1873. In addition to seamanship skills, naval cadets were trained to fire rifles and revolvers. The 1874 training year followed a similar pattern, and all three ships were employed to train a total of 261 cadets. Schwarzenberg filled the training role until 1890, when she was struck from the naval register on 20 November.
