= Battle of Heligoland (1864) =

Battle of the Second Schleswig War

Coordinates: 54.0500°N 7.8500°E

- Part of the Second Schleswig War
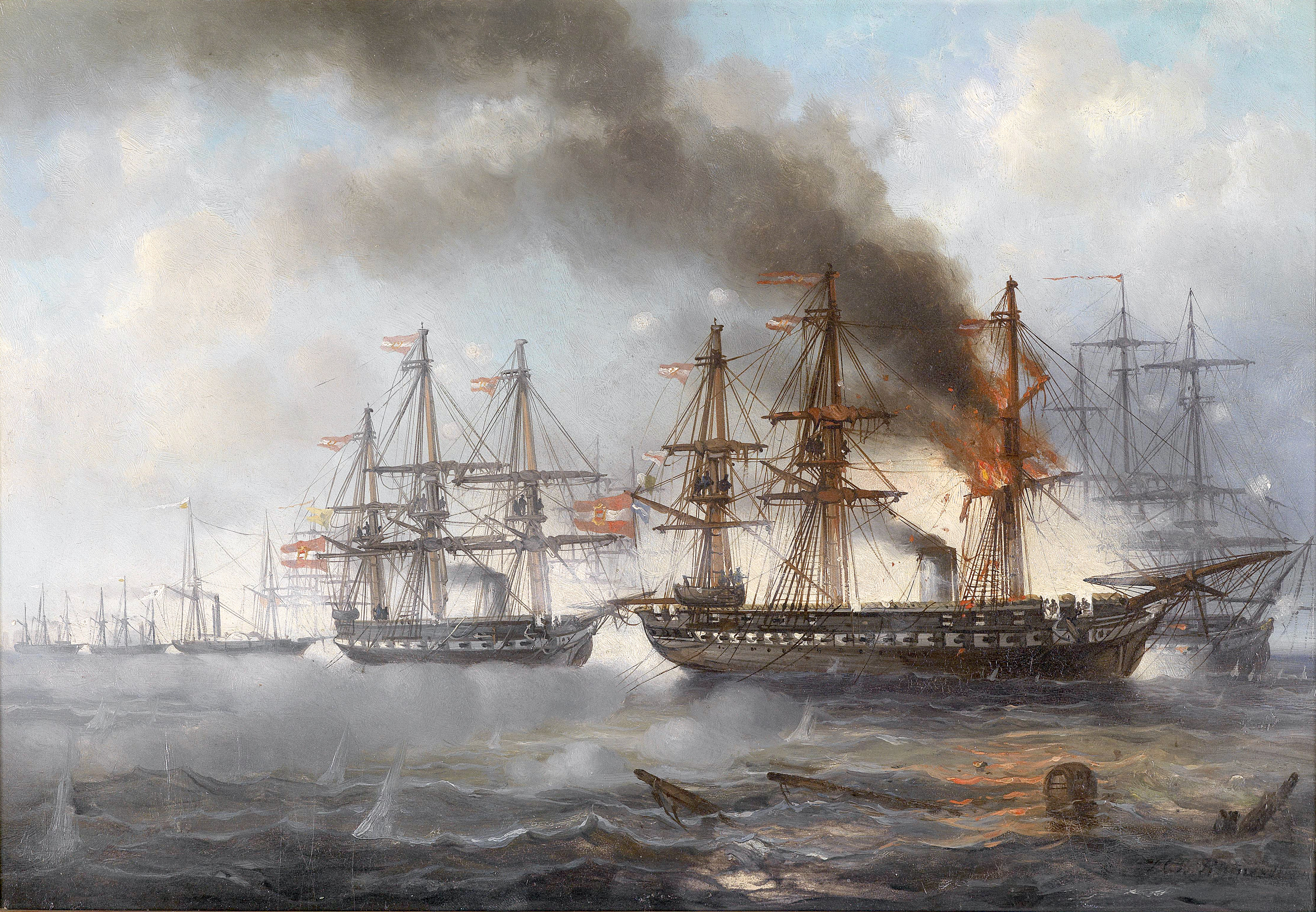
- The naval battle of Heligoland in 1864; Josef Carl Berthold Püttner
| Date | 9 May 1864 |
| Location | Off Heligoland, German Bight |
| Result | See Aftermath |

Belligerents
| Denmark | Austrian Empire; Kingdom of Prussia |

Commanders and leaders
| (Denmark) Edouard Suenson | (Austrian Empire) Wilhelm von Tegetthoff |

Strength
| 2 screw frigates 1 screw corvette | 2 screw frigates 1 aviso 2 gunboats |

Casualties and losses
| 14 killed 54 wounded 1 frigate damaged | 36 killed 108 wounded 2 frigates damaged |

The Battle of Heligoland (or Helgoland) was fought on 9 May 1864, during the Second Schleswig War, between a Danish squadron led by Commodore Edouard Suenson and a joint Austro-Prussian squadron commanded by the Austrian Commodore Wilhelm von Tegetthoff. The action came about as a result of the Danish blockade of German ports in the North Sea; the Austrians had sent two steam frigates, SMS Schwarzenberg and Radetzky, to reinforce the small Prussian Navy to help break the blockade. After arriving in the North Sea, Tegetthoff joined a Prussian aviso and a pair of gunboats. To oppose him, Suenson had available the steam frigates Niels Juel and Jylland and the corvette Hejmdal.

On the morning of 9 May, the two squadrons encountered each other off the island of Heligoland, then controlled by neutral Great Britain. Tegetthoff attacked with his two frigates while the slower Prussian vessels lagged behind, unable to effectively engage the Danish warships. Tegetthoff's flagship, Schwarzenberg, bore the brunt of the Danish gunfire and caught fire three times, the last of which could not be put out quickly and forced Tegetthoff to seek shelter in the neutral waters around Heligoland. Though Denmark claimed a tactical victory in the battle, the Danes were forced to end the blockade of the German coast. An armistice came into effect three days after the Battle of Heligoland. By the time fighting resumed in June, further Austrian warships had arrived to strengthen the Austro-Prussian naval forces, and the Danes did not seek to challenge them.

Historians' opinions on the outcome of the battle are mixed, with some citing the withdrawal of Tegetthoff's ships, and the greater damage they sustained, as evidence of a tactical victory for Suenson. Other naval historians cite the lifting of the blockade as a strategic victory for the Austrians and Prussians, and others still describe the battle as inconclusive. The Battle of Heligoland was the last naval battle fought by squadrons of wooden ships, and it was also the last time Danish warships fought a major action. Jylland is preserved in Ebeltoft, the last surviving wooden-hulled, screw-driven warship.

== Background ==
In late 1863, tensions began to increase between the German Confederation and Denmark over the latter's November Constitution, which integrated the duchies of Schleswig, Holstein, and Lauenburg with Denmark, a violation of the London Protocol that had ended the First Schleswig War. The crisis erupted in the Second Schleswig War, which began on 1 February 1864, after the Prussian and Austrian Empires delivered an ultimatum to Denmark to cede the disputed duchies to Austro-Prussian control. At the time, the Danish fleet was far superior to the Prussian naval forces initially available, which allowed the Danes to blockade the German coast. The bulk of the Prussian fleet was concentrated in the Baltic Sea, and the Austrian fleet was primarily stationed in the Mediterranean Sea. Also in the Mediterranean were the Prussian aviso SMS Preussischer Adler and the gunboats Blitz and Basilisk; these vessels were immediately recalled to German waters.

In the meantime, on 30 March, the Danish fleet formed the North Sea Squadron, which at the time consisted of the steam frigate Niels Juel and the steam corvettes Hejmdal and Dagmar, commanded by Commodore Edouard Suenson. On 6 May, the frigate Jylland relieved Dagmar, allowing her to be transferred to the Baltic Sea. By this time, the Danish squadron had captured fifteen German prizes, along with four blockade runners from neutral countries. Additionally, the ports of Hamburg and Bremen were effectively closed to traffic.

To reinforce their Prussian allies and break the blockade, the Austrians assembled a powerful squadron, which equaled the Danish fleet, and ordered it to steam from the Mediterranean Sea to the North Sea to break the blockade. The squadron was to comprise the ship-of-the-line Kaiser, the armored frigates Don Juan d'Austria and Kaiser Max, the screw frigates Schwarzenberg and Radetzky, the screw corvette Erzherzog Friedrich, the sidewheel gunboats Kaiserin Elizabeth and Lucia, and the gunboats Seehund and Wal. Initially, only the Austrian Levant Squadron, commanded by Commodore Wilhelm von Tegetthoff, was ready and so those ships were ordered north in advance of the rest of the squadron. The Levant Squadron, centered on Schwarzenberg and Radetzky arrived in the North Sea on 1 May; Tegetthoff's other two vessels, the corvette Dandolo and the gunboat Seehund, were unavailable due to boiler trouble and a grounding, respectively. The Austrian and Prussian squadrons rendezvoused in Texel, the Netherlands, and Tegetthoff added Preussischer Adler, Blitz, and Basilisk to his force. Tegetthoff took his flotilla to attack the Danish North Sea Squadron.

On the morning of 7 May, Tegetthoff's ships spotted the British frigate Aurora off the island of Heligoland; after Tegetthoff closed to determine that Aurora was a neutral warship, he took his squadron to anchor off the island of Sylt. Aurora, commanded by Francis Leopold McClintock, encountered Suenson's squadron the next day. McClintock informed Suenson of the last known location of the Austro-Prussian squadron. In the meantime, Tegetthoff had proceeded further to Cuxhaven, at the mouth of the Elbe, to replenish his fuel stores.

== Battle ==
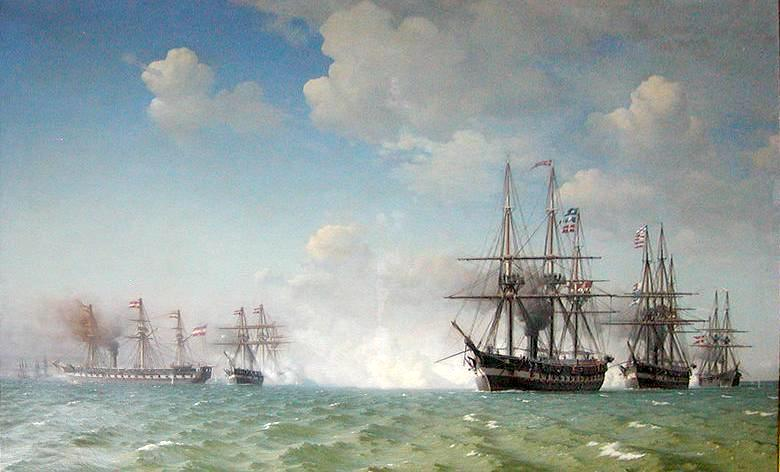
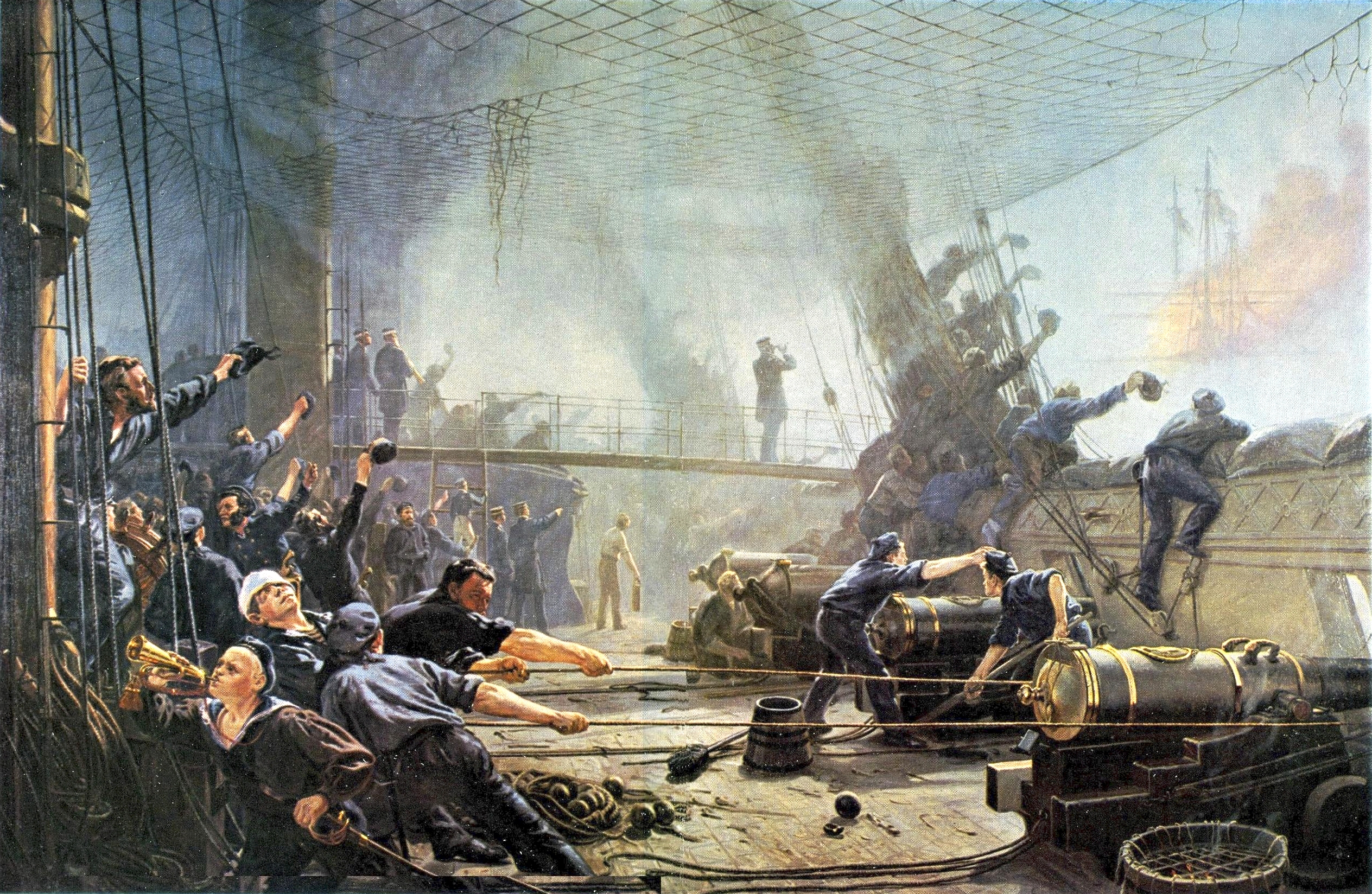
Top: Another painting of the battle, Slaget ved Helgoland, depicting the Danish ships in the foreground with the burning Schwarzenberg on fire in the distance. Bottom: Aboard the frigate Niels Juel at the Battle of Heligoland by Christian Mølsted

Early on 9 May, Tegetthoff received word that the Danish squadron was cruising off Helgoland. He immediately sortied, and by 10:00 approached the Danish warships. Shortly after 10:00, lookouts aboard the Danish vessels spotted smoke from Tegetthoff's ships approaching from the south. Three hours later, the two squadrons were in visual range, and Aurora, which had been observing the Danish squadron, took up a position to delineate the neutral waters around the island. A little after 13:30, the Austrian, Prussian, and Danish commanders all ordered their crews to clear for action. The Austro-Prussian squadron opened fire first, at 13:57, with Schwarzenberg's bow guns at a range of about 3,430 meters (3,750 yd). The two squadrons, in line ahead formation with the Prussian vessels lagging behind, closed to about 1,800 m (2,000 yd) and passed in opposite directions, firing broadsides at each other. A shell from Niels Juel struck Schwarzenberg and killed or wounded most of the men on one of her starboard guns.

Tegetthoff turned his ships back to the south to chase Suenson, who in turn altered course to try to cut off the Prussian gunboats. As Schwarzenberg turned, the distance closed to just over 370 m (400 yd), and she came under fire from all three Danish vessels. Jylland and Hejmdal then shifted fire to Radetzky. The Prussian vessels remained on the disengaged side of the Austrian frigates, firing at the Danish vessels with little effect. One of the Austrian vessels scored a hit on Jylland that killed or wounded all the men in one of her gun crews. The crews of the guns on either side fled their positions at the sight of the carnage until one of the men returned, calling his comrades to join him. During this period of the battle, Schwarzenberg suffered multiple shell hits and was set afire three times. Her crew extinguished the first two, but the third, in her foretopsail, proved to be too difficult to fight.

By 16:00, Schwarzenberg began to withdraw from the action, her forward rigging and forecastle burning badly. Tegetthoff decided to break off the engagement and fled to the neutral waters around Heligoland. As Tegetthoff's ships began to withdraw, one of them scored a hit on Jylland's rudder, which prevented Suenson from effectively pursuing the retreating Austrians and Prussians. McClintock took Aurora between the two squadrons to deter Suenson from pursuing Tegetthoff in violation of British neutrality. The two Austrian frigates had suffered a total of 36 men killed and 108 wounded; of those 31 killed and 81 wounded aboard Schwarzenberg—and both vessels were damaged. The Danish vessels suffered 14 men killed and 54 wounded, and only Niels Juel was damaged in the action. The battle was the last to be fought solely by wooden warships, and it was also the last major naval action to involve the Danish Navy.

== Aftermath ==
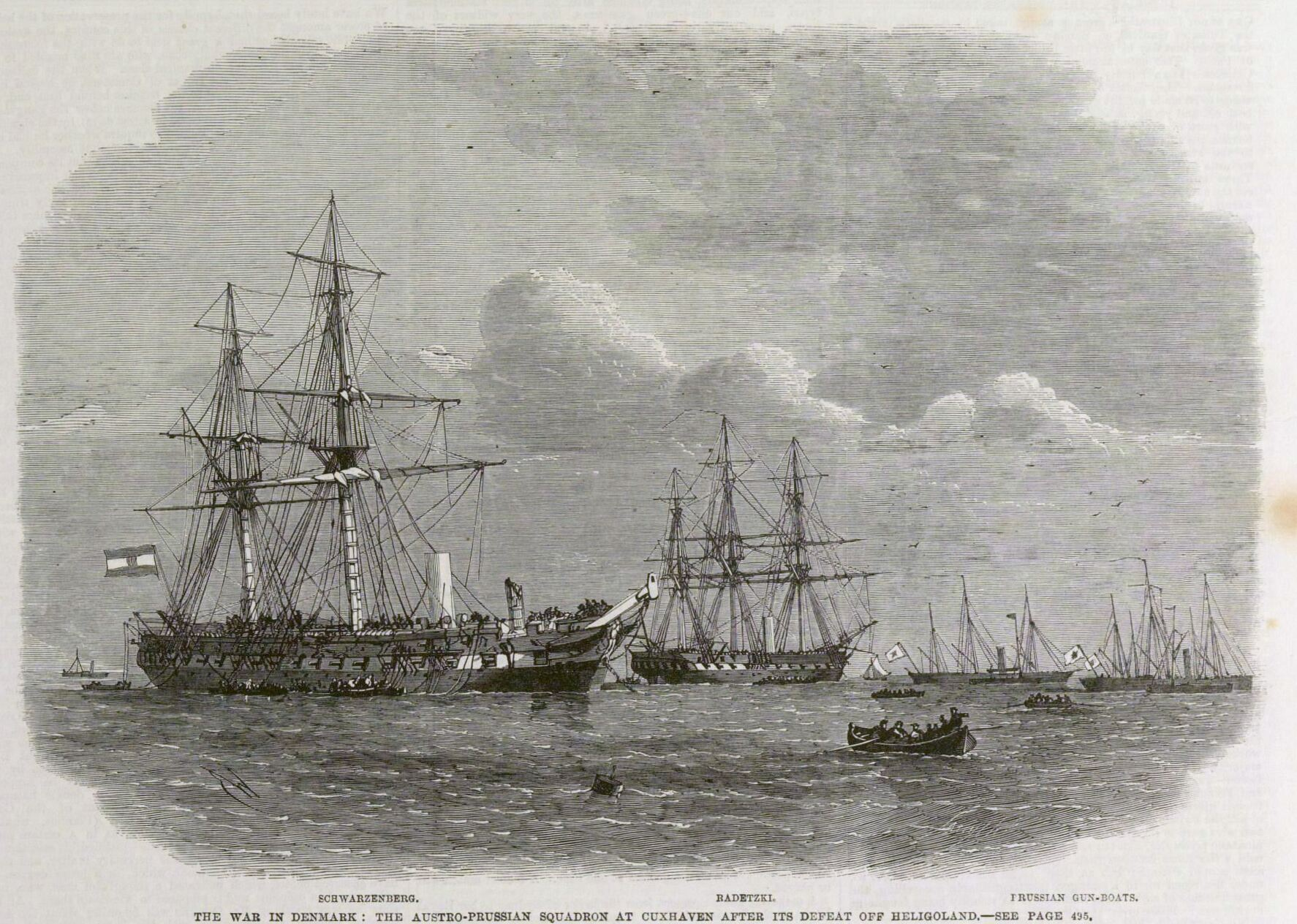
The Austro-Prussian Squadron at Cuxhaven after its Defeat off Heligoland, 1864. Schwarzenberg and Radetzky.

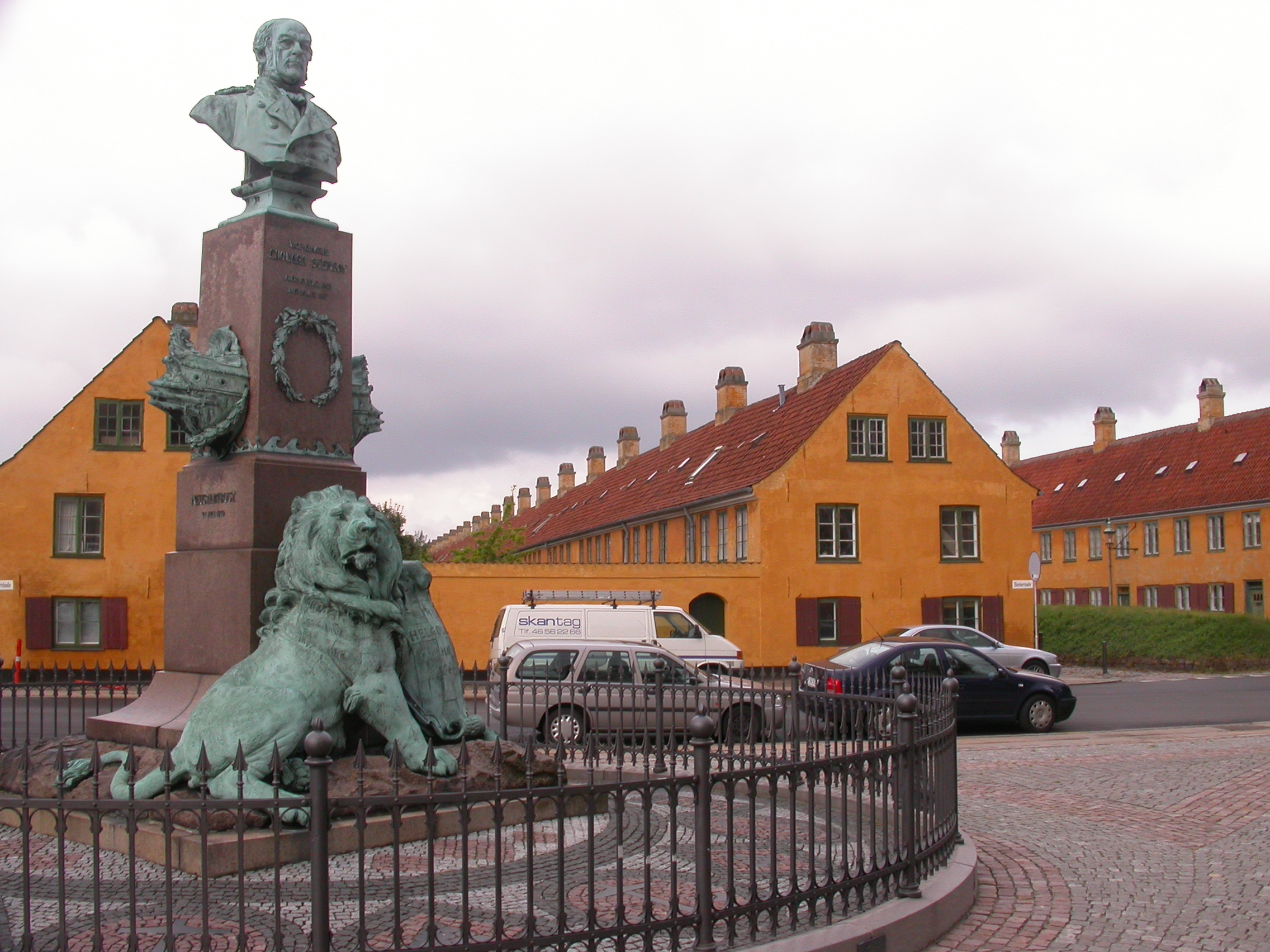
The memorial to Edouard Suenson at Nyboder in Copenhagen

Suenson waited outside the British zone of 3 nautical miles (5.6 km), but the Austrian-Prussian squadron escaped during the night to Cuxhaven, arriving at about 04:00 on 10 May. On reaching the port, the Austrian ships began to repair the damage sustained in the battle. Suenson sent his casualties ashore and resumed patrolling in the southern North Sea, between Heligoland and the Elbe. The day of the battle, the two sides had signed an armistice in London that took effect on 12 May, temporarily ending the fighting. The armistice lasted until 26 June, when fighting resumed on land. The following day, a second Austrian squadron, which included the ship of the line Kaiser, the armored frigate Don Juan d'Austria, and two smaller vessels under Vice Admiral Bernhard von Wüllerstorf-Urbair arrived to reinforce Tegetthoff's ships. The now outnumbered Danish fleet remained in port for the rest of the war and did not seek battle with the Austro-Prussian squadron. Instead, the Austrian and Prussian naval forces supported operations to capture the islands off the western Danish coast. These advances, coupled with the capture of the island of Als in the Baltic Sea, forced the Danes to seek a second armistice on 29 June.

Denmark claimed to have won the Battle of Heligoland, though they could no longer blockade the northern German ports. Tegetthoff himself claimed a draw, but he was promoted to rear admiral as a reward for his actions during the battle. The opinions of naval historians on the outcome of the battle are similarly mixed; Anthony Sokol, a historian of the Austrian Navy, states that "In spite of the damage they had sustained, the Austrians had won a strategic victory", citing the fact that the Danish blockade had been lifted. John Greene and Allesandro Massignani state that "Heligoland was Tegetthoff's day", though noting that Suenson could have won a victory had Jylland not been rendered unmaneuverable at the end of the action. On the other hand, David Zabecki affirms the argument that the battle "was a tactical Danish victory", while noting the lifting of the blockade. David Olivier described the battle as inconclusive, though also noted the end of the blockade.

Jylland is today located in a drydock in a maritime museum in Ebeltoft, Denmark. She is the last surviving screw-driven, wooden-hulled warship. In Copenhagen, at Nyboder, there is a monument commemorating Suenson. A German memorial to the Austrian sailors who died in the battle was erected in Ritzebüttel, Cuxhaven.

== Order of battle ==
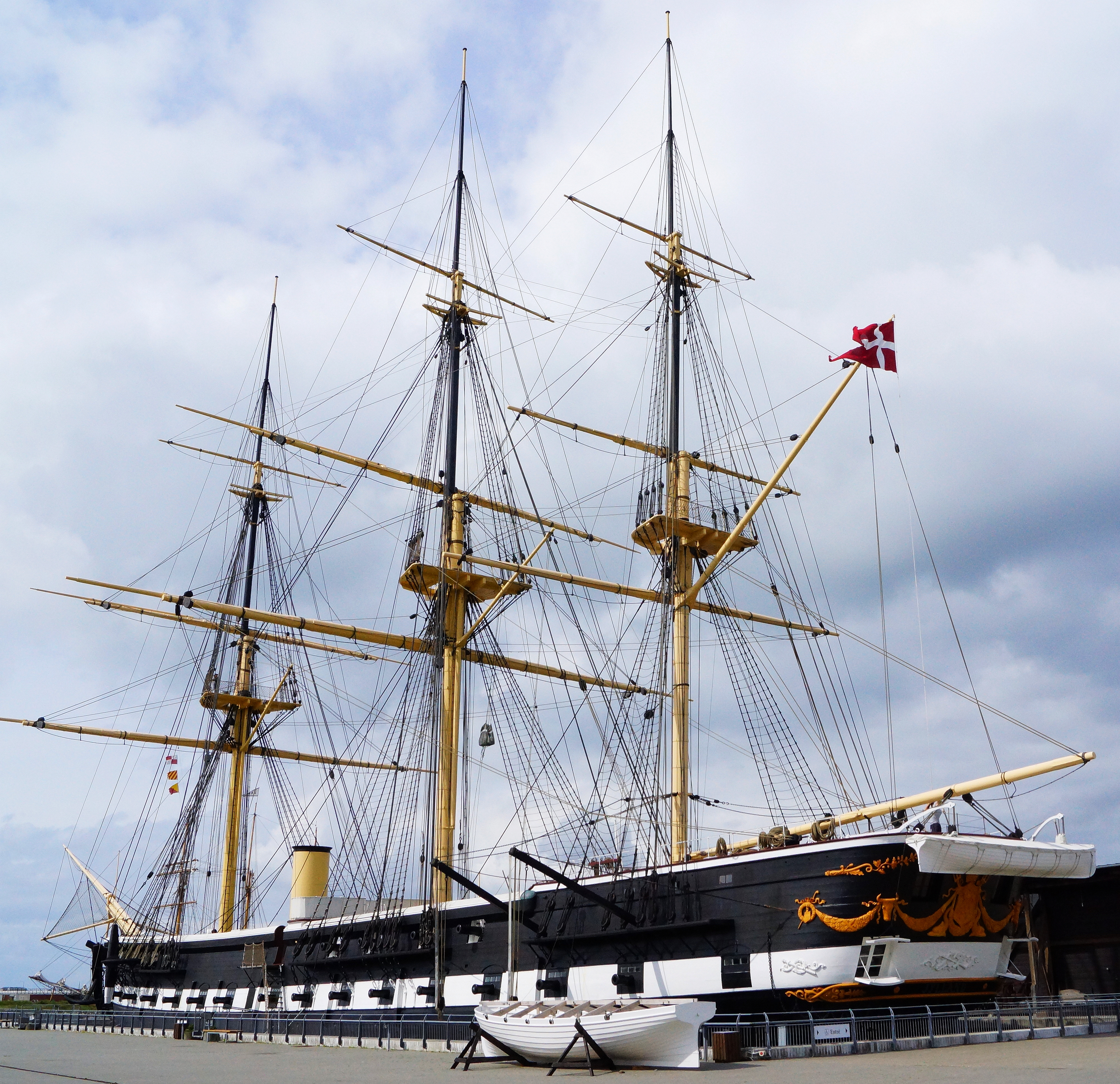
Jylland, preserved as a museum ship

=== Denmark ===
Commander: Captain Edouard Suenson

| Name | Type | Guns | Speed | Displacement | Crew |
|---|---|---|---|---|---|
| Niels Juel | Screw frigate | 30 × 30-pounder guns 12 × 18-pounder guns | 9.3 knots (17.2 km/h; 10.7 mph) | 1,934 t (1,903 long tons; 2,132 short tons) | 422 |
| Jylland | Screw frigate | 32 × 30-pounder guns 8 × 18-pounder guns 8 × 12-pounder guns | 12 kn (22 km/h; 14 mph) | 1,988 t (1,957 long tons; 2,191 short tons) | 437 |
| Hejmdal | Screw corvette | 14 × 30-pounder guns 2 × 18-pounder guns | 9.5 kn (17.6 km/h; 10.9 mph) | 892 t (878 long tons; 983 short tons) | 164 |

=== Austro-Prussian squadron ===
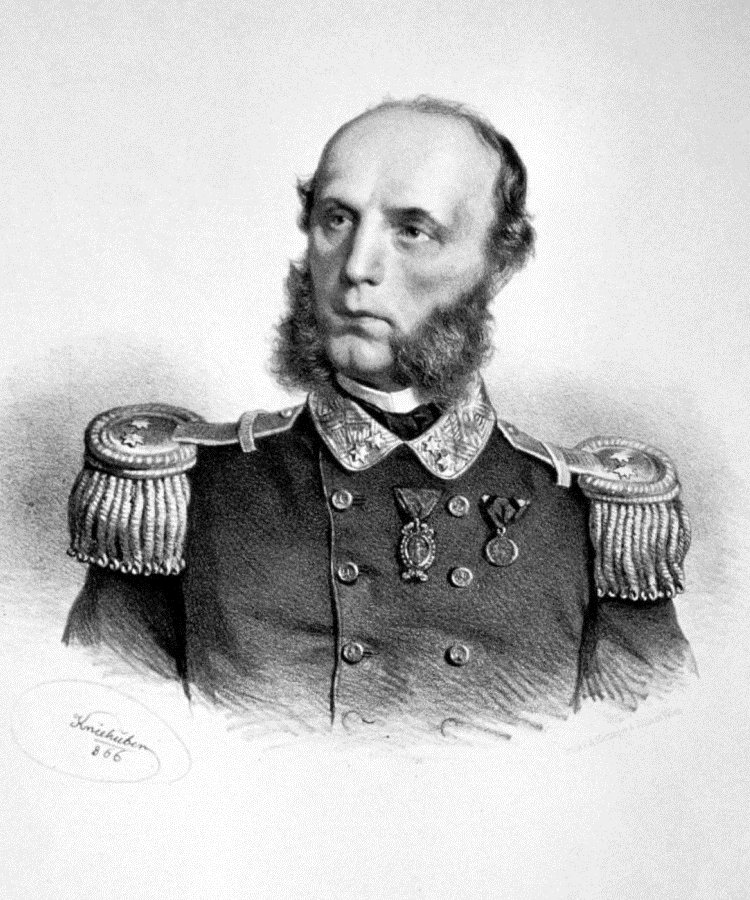
Lithograph of Wilhelm von Tegetthoff in 1866

Commander: Commodore Wilhelm von Tegetthoff

| Name | Nationality | Type | Guns | Speed | Displacement | Crew |
|---|---|---|---|---|---|---|
| Schwarzenberg | Austria | Screw frigate | 6 × 60-pounder guns 28 × 30-pounder guns 4 × 24-pounder guns | 11 knots (20 km/h; 13 mph) | 2,614 t (2,573 long tons; 2,881 short tons) | 498 |
| Radetzky | Austria | Screw frigate | 4 × 60-pounder guns 24 × 30-pounder guns 3 × 24-pounder guns | 9 kn (17 km/h; 10 mph) | 2,334 t (2,297 long tons; 2,573 short tons) | 372 |
| Preussischer Adler | Prussia | Aviso | 2 × 68-pounder guns | 10 kn (19 km/h; 12 mph) | 1,171 t (1,153 long tons; 1,291 short tons) | 110 |
| Blitz | Prussia | Gunboat | 1 × 68-pounder gun 1 × 24-pounder gun | 9 kn (17 km/h; 10 mph) | 415 t (408 long tons; 457 short tons) | 66 |
| Basilisk | Prussia | Gunboat | 1 × 68-pounder gun 1 × 24-pounder gun | 9 kn (17 km/h; 10 mph) | 415 t (408 long tons; 457 short tons) | 66 |
