= SMS Erzherzog Friedrich (1857) =

- Erzherzog Friedrich

History
- Name: Erzherzog Friedrich
- Builder: Venetian Arsenal, Venice
- Laid down: 14 February 1854
- Launched: 11 April 1857
- Completed: 1857
- Decommissioned: 1897
- Stricken: August 1897
- Fate: Scrapped, 1899

General characteristics
- Class & type: Erzherzog Friedrich-class corvette
- Displacement: 1,697 long tons (1,724 t)
- Length: 67.8 m (222 ft 5 in)
- Beam: 12.16 m (39 ft 11 in)
- Draft: 5.08 m (16 ft 8 in)
- Installed power: 920 ihp (690 kW)
- Propulsion: 1 × marine steam engine; 1 × screw propeller
- Speed: 8 to 9 knots (15 to 17 km/h; 9.2 to 10.4 mph)
- Complement: 294
- Armament: 17 × 30-pounder guns; 4 × 60-pounder Paixhans guns; 1 × 48-pounder gun

SMS Erzherzog Friedrich was a screw corvette of the Austrian Navy, and was built in the 1850s. She was the lead ship of the Erzherzog Friedrich class, the first vessels of that type built for the Austrian fleet. She had one sister ship, Dandolo.

== Design ==
Erzherzog Friedrich was 67.8 m (222 ft 5 in) long overall, with a beam of 12.16 m (39 ft 11 in) and a draft of 5.08 m (16 ft 8 in). The ship had a displacement of 1,697 long tons (1,724 t). Her crew numbered 294 officers and enlisted sailors.

The ship was powered by a single 2-cylinder, horizontal marine steam engine that drove a screw propeller. The number and type of boilers is not known, but smoke from the boilers was vented through a single funnel located amidships, between the fore- and main mast. The propulsion system was capable of generating 920 indicated horsepower (690 kW), for a top speed of 8 to 9 knots (15 to 17 km/h; 9.2 to 10.4 mph). The ship was fitted with a three-masted sailing rig to supplement the steam engine on long voyages.

Erzherzog Friedrich was armed with a main battery of seventeen 30-pounder muzzleloading guns, which were supplemented with four shell-firing, 60-pounder Paixhans guns and a single 48-pounder gun. By 1866, one of the 30-pounder guns and the 48-pounder had been removed and a pair of 24-pounder rifled guns were installed. By 1871, the ship's armament had been standardized on fourteen of the 24-pounder guns, with one 3-pounder gun. A final refit by 1877 saw the ship exchange her old muzzleloaders for a battery of twelve 15 cm (5.9 in) breechloading guns, supported by two 7 cm (2.8 in) guns.

== Service history ==
Erzherzog Friedrich in port

Erzherzog Friedrich was built at the Venetian Arsenal, beginning with her keel laying on 14 February 1854. She was launched on 11 April 1857, and was completed soon thereafter. In mid-1857, Erzherzog Friedrich and the screw frigates Radetzky and Adria went on a training cruise in the North and Baltic Seas. They stopped in Hamburg; Danzig, Prussia; Copenhagen, Denmark; and Karlskrona, Sweden, but they avoided British and French ports on their way to and from the Baltic, and did not continue on to visit Russia either; all three countries were still resentful of Austria's failure to enter the Crimean War on either the Anglo-French or Russian sides. Nevertheless, it was the first time an Austrian squadron of screw warships operated together outside of home waters.

In early 1859, tensions between Austria and the Kingdom of Sardinia rose significantly, prompting the Austrian government to order the fleet to mobilize in February to be prepared for an attack by the Royal Sardinian Navy. Sardinia had signed a secret alliance with France the month before, and in April, the Second Italian War of Independence began. Though the sizes of the Austrian and Sardinian fleets were roughly equal, the French Navy was far superior, which forced the Austrians to take a defensive posture. Erzherzog Friedrich and the other, modern steam-powered warships concentrated at Pola in the northern Adriatic. They did not sortie to attach the French or Sardinian naval forces, and the war ended quickly after the defeats at Magenta and Solferino in June.

Already in late 1862, the head of the Austrian Navy, Archduke Ferdinand Max, offered the sale Erzherzog Friedrich and several other wooden ships in an attempt to acquire funds to build a fleet of ironclad warships, though the proposal came to nothing.

After the start of the Second Schleswig War in February 1864, which saw Austria and Prussia fighting Denmark, the Austrian Navy deployed several warships to the North Sea to engage the Danish fleet. Erzherzog Friedrich joined the ship of the line Kaiser, the paddle steamer Elisabeth and a gunboat, departing Austrian waters in April under the command of Admiral Bernhard von Wüllerstorf-Urbair. Poor weather and insufficient training aboard many of the ships hampered the Austrian voyage, and by the time the ships arrived in the North Sea, the Danish fleet had withdrawn to the Baltic, leaving the Austrians to conduct operations against the islands along the coast until an armistice ended the fighting in July. The bulk of the Austrian fleet withdrew after the war ended, but Erzherzog Friedrich remained in the area until early 1866, when she, too, returned home, when it became clear that war with Italy was likely imminent.

=== Third Italian War of Independence ===
Map showing the disposition of the fleets on 20 July

After the outbreak of the Austro-Prussian War in June 1866, the Austrian Navy began to mobilize, as the conflict quickly widened to include Prussia's ally Italy on 20 June. The fleet came under command of Kontreadmiral (Rear Admiral) Wilhelm von Tegetthoff, who worked to prepare his fleet, which was largely crewed by untrained men. As the fleet made its preparations, the ships carried out extensive practice in the Fasana Channel, which was protected from an Italian attack by naval mines. Erzherzog Friedrich and the other wooden vessels were fitted with iron chains that draped down over the sides of their hulls to give them a degree of protection for the coming fight with Italy's larger fleet of ironclads.

On 17 July, the Austrian garrison on the island of Lissa telegraphed that an Italian fleet was in the area and had begun an attack on the island. Tegetthoff initially believed the attack to be a feint to draw his fleet away from Venice and Trieste, but by the 19th, it had become clear that the Italians intended to land on the island. That afternoon, he received permission to sortie and attack the Italian fleet. To offset his fleet's numerical inferiority, particularly in armored warships, Tegetthoff arranged his fleet in three lines abreast, led by the ironclads. Erzherzog Friedrich and the rest of the larger wooden ships made up the second echelon, about 900 m (1,000 yd) behind. The second line, led by Kommodore Anton von Petz aboard Kaiser, also included Erzherzog Friedrich and the screw frigates Radetzky, Adria, Donau, Schwarzenberg, and Novara. The fleet arrived off Lissa on the morning of 20 July, initiating the Battle of Lissa.

Tegetthoff led his ironclads into the center of the Italian line of battle to initiate a melee, but failed to ram any Italian ships on his first attempt. Petz then took his ships south to attack the Italian wooden frigates, which had failed to answer Persano's orders. Instead, the rearmost division of Italian ironclads turned to engage Petz's ships. The Italian ironclad Re di Portogallo engaged Erzherzog Friedrich and Elisabeth, prompting Kaiser to charge at the ironclad in an attempt to ram it. The move caused several ironclads to concentrate their fire on Kaiser, and she was badly mauled before the Austrians managed to escape. By that time, Tegetthoff's ironclads had rammed and sunk the Italian ironclad Re d'Italia and inflicted fatal damage on the coastal defense ship Palestro, prompting the Italians to disengage. As the Italians began to withdraw, Tegetthoff took his ships to Lissa to confirm that the Austrian garrison still controlled the island. He then reformed the fleet; Erzherzog Friedrich and the wooden ships formed up on the disengaged side of the line of ironclads. Tegetthoff pursued the retreating Italians, but had no chance of catching the faster Italian vessels. As night began to fall, the opposing fleets disengaged completely, heading for Ancona and Pola, respectively.

=== Later career ===
Erzherzog Friedrich, date unknown

In October 1868, Erzherzog Friedrich and Donau sailed from Trieste on a major voyage to Siam, China, and Japan to negotiate trade treaties with those countries. The trip had been planned for 1866, but the war with Italy had forced a delay. The two ships were commanded by Petz, and they sailed south, around Africa, and then crossed the Indian Ocean on their way to East Asia. They stopped in Bangkok, Siam, before continuing on to China. From there, they sailed to Yokohama, Japan. Erzherzog Friedrich was badly damaged by a typhoon off Japan and was sent home early by the same route the ships had taken before. Erzherzog Friedrich initially sailed to China, arriving in Shanghai on 24 November, where she underwent repairs to her caboose and water distiller, which were completed by 10 December. The ship then sailed south, stopping in Manila in the Philippines from 21 January 1870 to 5 February, and then passing along the coast of Cochinchina before arriving in Batavia in the Dutch East Indies on 19 February. That day, she participated in a celebration for the birthday of William III, the Dutch king. The ship then sailed to Onrust Island to replenish coal in early March. Erzherzog Friedrich then moved to Singapore, where she awaited orders to pick up ratified copies of the treaties that Petz had negotiated the previous year.

By July, the Austrian Reichsrat and the Diet of Hungary had failed to ratify the treaties before the end of their legislative sessions, so the naval command decided to send Erzherzog Friedrich back north to Japan, so she would be available in the event that the legislatures passed the treaties in the winter months (and to avoid the northeast monsoons in the southwest Pacific). The ship got underway on 3 August, and had reached Hong Kong by 15 August. She remained there for several days, waiting on mail from Shanghai for news from Europe, and on 18 August, her crew marked the birthday of Kaiser Franz Joseph. Erzherzog Friedrich left Hong Kong on 24 August, bound for Amoy, where she replenished her coal stocks on 26 August. In the meantime, the Austrian Ministry of Foreign Affairs decided to postpone ratification of the treaties, allowing the naval command to order Erzherzog Friedrich home on 11 August. The instructions did not reach the ship until early October, by which time she had arrived in Yokohama. She left Japanese waters on 6 October, bound for home. After passing through Singapore, where repairs to her rigging were made, she crossed the Indian Ocean, passed through the Suez Canal in early January 1871, and eventually arrived in Pola on 26 January. She was decommissioned there four days later. Donau, meanwhile, continued on across the Pacific, around South America (where Petz negotiated other agreements with various governments there) and anchored in Pola in March.

Erzherzog Friedrich next recommissioned on 17 June 1871 for another training cruise with naval cadets. The steamer SS Alnoch towed her from Pola to Fasana on 20 June, from which she departed under sail the following day. She initially stopped in Lissa on 24 June, before returning to Pola four days later; the ship then sailed back south to Fiume on 4 July. There, she embarked the contingent of cadets and Konteradmiral Alois von Pokorny, the commandant of the naval academy. From there, Erzherzog Friedrich embarked on a tour of the central Mediterranean, stopping first in Malta and then sailing to La Goulette, Tunisia. The ship then turned east in early August to visit Messina, Italy, and then Patras and Ithaca in Greece. Later stops included Gravosa (18 August); Kalamota (22 August); Pola (26–30 August); and Venice (30 August – 4 September). After leaving Venice, Erzherzog Friedrich sailed to Rovinj, where she conducted training exercises and shooting practice. These continued on the way to Pirano, which she reached on 7 September; the next day, she moved to Trieste. Some of the cadets were released on leave there, and by 12 September, the ship had returned to Fiume, where the remainder of the cadets were sent ashore. The next day, Pokorny left the ship as well. Erzherzog Friedrich returned to Pola on 14 September, and she was decommissioned there again four days later.

The ship next recommissioned on 30 April 1874 for another extended voyage abroad, this time on a trade mission to East Asia. After preparations for the voyage were completed, Erzherzog Friedrich sailed from Pola on 26 May. She reached Port Said five days later, where she replenished coal before passing through the Suez Canal. She stopped in Aden and then Galle, British Ceylon, on her way. While in the latter port, repairs were made before departing on 11 July. She reached Singapore on 24 July. The ship thereafter cruised in East Asian waters for several months, visiting Siam, China, and Japan. While in the region in 1875, the ship sailed to the island of Borneo to evaluate its suitability as an Austro-Hungarian colony, but when a landing party was sent ashore to explore the island, local residents killed two of the men and forced the rest to withdraw, which ended plans to colonize the island. Erzherzog Friedrich thereafter crossed the Pacific, visiting San Francisco, United States, along with several South American countries on her voyage back to the Adriatic, which she reached in 1876. The voyage saw the ship circumnavigate the globe; she was the third Austrian vessel to have done so.

In 1882–1883, Erzherzog Friedrich went on a third major voyage abroad, this time largely to South American waters. She toured several countries in the region, including stops in Brazil, and she also crossed the Atlantic to western Africa. She then sailed north to visit ports in the West Indies, ending with a stop in New York City, United States. Erzherzog Friedrich was decommissioned in 1897, and was struck from the naval register in August that year, to be converted into a transport to carry boilers from Pola to Trieste. She served in this capacity only briefly, and in 1899 she was broken up.
