= SMS Adria (1856) =

Austrian navy ship

- Adria in Trieste in 1859

History

Austria-Hungary
- Name: Adria
- Builder: Stabilimento Tecnico Triestino, Trieste
- Laid down: 1 August 1855
- Launched: 26 January 1856
- Completed: 1857
- Fate: Broken up, 1888

General characteristics
- Class & type: Radetzky-class frigate
- Displacement: 2,165 long tons (2,200 t) (full load)
- Length: 70.62 m (231 ft 8 in) length overall
- Beam: 13.06 m (42 ft 10 in)
- Draft: 5.46 m (17 ft 11 in)
- Installed power: 1,200 ihp (890 kW)
- Propulsion: 1 × marine steam engine; 1 × screw propeller
- Speed: 9 knots (17 km/h; 10 mph)
- Complement: 354
- Armament: 6 × 60-pounder Paixhans guns; 40 × 30-pounder muzzleloading guns; 4 × 24-pounder breechloading guns

SMS Adria was the second of three Radetzky class of screw frigates built for the Austrian Navy in the 1850s.

== Design ==
In 1852, the Austrian Navy secured funding to acquire its first screw frigate, which was to be built in Britain, as the Austrian shipbuilding industry did not have sufficient experience designing and building steam-powered warships. Two further ships, Adria and Donau, would then be built in domestic shipyards to the same plans.

Adria was 70.62 m (231 ft 8 in) long overall, and she had a beam of 13.06 m (42 ft 10 in) and a draft of 5.46 m (17 ft 11 in). The ship had a displacement of 2,165 long tons (2,200 t) at full load. Her crew numbered 354 officers and enlisted sailors as originally built, but this later increased to 398.

The ship was powered by a single 2-cylinder marine steam engine that drove a screw propeller. The number and type of boilers is not known, but smoke from the boilers was vented through a single funnel located forward of amidships, between the fore- and main mast. The propulsion system was capable of generating 1,200 indicated horsepower (890 kW), for a top speed of 9 knots (17 km/h; 10 mph). The ship was fitted with a three-masted sailing rig to supplement the steam engine on long voyages.

Adria was armed with a battery of fifty guns as completed. These comprised six 60-pounder Paixhans guns that fired explosive shells, forty 30-pounder muzzleloading (ML) guns of two types, and four 24-pounder breechloading (BL) guns. In 1867, her armament was revised to just thirty-two 30-pounder ML guns, fourteen 24-pounder BL rifled guns, and four 4-pounder guns.

== Service history ==
Adria was built at the Stabilimento Tecnico Triestino shipyard in Trieste; her keel laying took place on 1 August 1855, and she was launched on 26 January 1856. The ship was completed in 1857. Later that year, Adria, her sister ship Radetzky, and the screw corvette Erzherzog Friedrich went on a training cruise in the North and Baltic Seas. They stopped in Hamburg; Danzig, Prussia; Copenhagen, Denmark; and Karlskrona, Sweden, but they avoided British and French ports on their way to and from the Baltic, and did not continue on to visit Russia either; all three countries were still resentful of Austria's failure to enter the Crimean War on either the Anglo-French or Russian sides. Nevertheless, it was the first time an Austrian squadron of screw warships operated together outside of home waters.

In early 1859, tensions between Austria and the Kingdom of Sardinia rose significantly, prompting the Austrian government to order the fleet to mobilize in February to be prepared for an attack by the Royal Sardinian Navy. Sardinia had signed a secret alliance with France the month before, and in April, the Second Italian War of Independence began. Though the sizes of the Austrian and Sardinian fleets were roughly equal, the French Navy was far superior, which forced the Austrians to take a defensive posture. Adria and the other, modern steam-powered warships concentrated at Pola in the northern Adriatic. They did not sortie to attach the French or Sardinian naval forces, and the war ended quickly after the defeats at Magenta and Solferino in June.

=== Third Italian War of Independence ===
Map showing the disposition of the fleets on 20 July

After the outbreak of the Austro-Prussian War in June 1866, the Austrian Navy began to mobilize, as the conflict quickly widened to include Prussia's ally Italy on 20 June. The fleet came under command of Kontreadmiral (Rear Admiral) Wilhelm von Tegetthoff, who worked to prepare his fleet, which was largely crewed by untrained men. As the fleet made its preparations, the ships carried out extensive practice in the Fasana Channel, which was protected from an Italian attack by naval mines. Adria and the other wooden vessels were fitted with iron chains that draped down over the sides of their hulls to give them a degree of protection for the coming fight with Italy's larger fleet of ironclads. At that time, Rudolf Montecuccoli, a future commander of the navy, was serving aboard Adria.

On 17 July, the Austrian garrison on the island of Lissa telegraphed that an Italian fleet was in the area and had begun an attack on the island. Tegetthoff initially believed the attack to be a feint to draw his fleet away from Venice and Trieste, but by the 19th, it had become clear that the Italians intended to land on the island. That afternoon, he received permission to sortie and attack the Italian fleet. To offset his fleet's numerical inferiority, particularly in armored warships, Tegetthoff arranged his fleet in three lines abreast, led by the ironclads. Adria and the rest of the larger wooden ships made up the second echelon, about 900 m (1,000 yd) behind. The second line, led by Kommodore Anton von Petz aboard Kaiser, also included Adria's sister ships, the screw frigates Schwarzenberg and Novara, and Erzherzog Friedrich. The fleet arrived off Lissa on the morning of 20 July, initiating the Battle of Lissa.

Tegetthoff led his ironclads into the center of the Italian line of battle to initiate a melee, but failed to ram any Italian ships on his first attempt. Petz then took his ships south to attack the Italian wooden frigates, which had failed to answer Persano's orders. Instead, the rearmost division of Italian ironclads turned to engage Petz's ships. Kaiser bore the brunt of the Italian fire, and was badly mauled before the Austrians managed to escape. By that time, Tegetthoff's ironclads had rammed and sunk the Italian ironclad Re d'Italia and inflicted fatal damage on the coastal defense ship Palestro, prompting the Italians to disengage. As the Italians began to withdraw, Tegetthoff took his ships to Lissa to confirm that the Austrian garrison still controlled the island. He then reformed the fleet; Radetzky and the wooden ships formed up on the disengaged side of the line of ironclads. Tegetthoff pursued the retreating Italians, but had no chance of catching the faster Italian vessels. As night began to fall, the opposing fleets disengaged completely, heading for Ancona and Pola, respectively.

=== Later career ===
After the war, Tegetthoff became the commander of what was now the Austro-Hungarian Navy. Over the course of 1868, he instituted a series of reforms to improve efficiency in the fleet, which included removing Adria and Schwarzenberg from active status, as they were no longer particularly seaworthy. Adria was reduced to a gunnery training ship. In 1869, she was supported by the battery ship Feuerspeier and the gunboats Grille and Gemse. Later that year, part of Adria's crew was sent to activate the ironclad Habsburg, owing to shortages of trained crewmen. Over the course of the year, Adria trained 377 men across 25 classes, less than she would have been capable of training if she had had a full crew. The following year, Adria embarked a total of 408 men to be trained over the course of 23 classes; of them, 85 were expelled either due to poor performance or behavior problems. Adria trained 441 men in 1872 over 20 classes. In December, the ship embarked a contingent of sixteen aspirants to the naval academy for a short training period; fifteen of the men passed the course in August 1873 and went on to train at the naval academy. Over the course of the 1873 training year, Adria trained 476 men in 24 classes. For 1874, Adria trained some 685 gunners for the fleet; by that time, the ship had been equipped with more modern 15 cm (5.9 in) and 7 cm (2.8 in) guns used by newer vessels in the fleet. Grille and Gemse continued to serve as support vessels through this time. The ship was struck from the naval register in 1888 and subsequently broken up.
