= SMS Adria =

Several ships of the Austrian Navy and Austro-Hungarian Navy have been named SMS Adria:

- SMS Adria (1826), a sail corvette
- SMS Adria (1856), a Radetzky-class screw frigate built in the 1850s
- SMS Radetzky (1872), a Radetzky-class screw frigate renamed Adria in 1908
