= SMS Novara (1850) =

Austro-Hungarian sail frigate

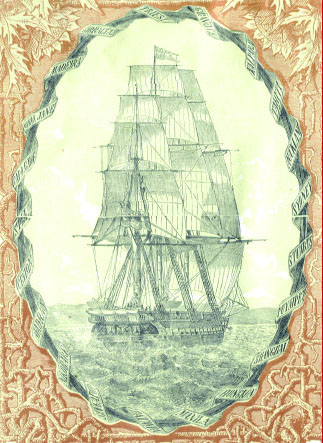
- Image of frigate Novara from expedition report Voyage of the Austrian Frigate Novara around the Earth (1861–1876), published in 21 volumes written over 15 years.

History

Austria-Hungary
- Name: Novara
- Namesake: Battle of Novara (1849)
- Builder: Venetian Arsenal, Venice
- Laid down: 20 September 1843
- Launched: 4 November 1850
- Completed: June 1851
- Commissioned: (pre-1862) Full-rigged frigate
- Decommissioned: Hulked, 22 August 1876
- Reclassified: Gunnery training ship, 22 June 1881
- Stricken: 22 October 1898
- Fate: Scrapped, 1899

General characteristics as reconstructed in 1862
- Type: Screw frigate
- Displacement: 2,615 t (2,574 long tons)
- Length: 76.79 m (251 ft 11 in)
- Beam: 14.32 m (47 ft 0 in)
- Draft: 5.8 m (19 ft 0 in)
- Installed power: 1,200 ihp (890 kW)
- Propulsion: 1 shaft, 1 steam engine
- Speed: 12 knots (22 km/h; 14 mph)
- Range: 3,300 nmi (6,100 km; 3,800 mi) at 10 knots (19 km/h; 12 mph)
- Complement: 550
- Armament: 4 × 60-pounder smoothbore Paixhans guns; 28 × 30-pounder Novara guns; 2 × 24-pounder Breech-loading guns

SMS Novara was a sail frigate of the Austro-Hungarian Navy most noted for sailing the globe for the Novara Expedition of 1857–1859 and, later for carrying Archduke Maximilian and wife Carlota to Veracruz in May 1864 to reign as Emperor and Empress of Mexico.

== History ==
=== Service ===
SMS Novara was a frigate that circumnavigated the Earth in the course of the Austrian Imperial expedition of 1857–1859, during the reign of (Kaiser) Emperor Franz Joseph I of Austria. It was a sailing ship with three masts of sails and six decks, outfitted with 42 cannons, and had a displacement of nearly 2,107 tons.

Between 1843 and 1899, SMS Novara had several different names and configurations: originally named Minerva when the lengthy construction started in Venice during 1843, the partially completed frigate was renamed Italia by Venetian revolutionaries in 1848, finally launched with the name Novara in 1850, and converted to a steam cruiser during 1861–1865.

The name Novara originated with the Battle of Novara in March 1849: following the Austrians' retaking of Venice in August 1849, Field Marshal Radetzky visited the shipyard there, and the officers petitioned him to have the nearly-completed Italia renamed in honour of his victory over King Charles Albert at the Italian town of Novara. The ship was subsequently christened "Novara" in 1849, and construction restarted in earnest under Austrian supervision. The hull left the slipway the following year, in November 1850.

The circumnavigation of the earth from April 1857 to August 1859 by Novara was one of the most important journeys for what became the Naturhistorisches Museum in Vienna. A number of eminent natural scientists joined the voyage, including Georg Ritter von Frauenfeld, curator in the invertebrate department of the Imperial museums. The material collected during the expedition was voluminous and prominent scientists continue to examine and write it to the present day; (see details below).

=== Novara expedition ===
An Austrian squadron welcomes Novara (left front) after the end of the voyage; also present are the frigates Adria (center) and Bellona (right)

The Novara expedition of 1857–1859 was the first large-scale scientific, around-the-world mission of the Austrian Imperial navy. Authorized by Archduke Maximillian, the journey lasted 2 years 4 months, from 30 April 1857 until 30 August 1859.

The expedition was accomplished by the frigate Novara, under the command of Kommodore Bernhard von Wüllerstorf-Urbair, with 345 officers and crew, plus 7 scientists aboard. Preparation for the research journey was made by the "Imperial Academy of Sciences in Vienna" and by specialized scholars under direction of the geologist Ferdinand von Hochstetter and the zoologist Georg von Frauenfeld. The first coca plant (cocaine) investigations, in particular on St. Paul Island, the Nicobar Islands, and on New Zealand (first geological mapping by Hochstetter), created the bases for future geological research. The oceanographic research, in particular in the South Pacific, revolutionized oceanography and hydrography.

The collections of botanical, zoological (26,000 preparations), and cultural material brought back enriched the Austrian museums (especially the natural-history museum). They were also studied by Johann Natterer, a scientist who collected Vienna museum specimens during 18 years in South America. The geomagnetic observations made throughout the whole expedition significantly increased the scientific knowledge in this field. Finally, the expedition's introduction of coca plant leaves made it possible to isolate cocaine in its pure form for the first time in 1860.

The results of the research journey were compiled into a 21-binder report of the Viennese Academy of Sciences, titled "Reise der österreichischen Fregatte Novara um die Erde (1861–1876)" ("journey of the Austrian frigate Novara around the earth"). Also published were many woodcuts under the same title. An account of the voyage was also published in English, in 3 volumes, by Karl Scherzer. (See § Legacy.)

The Novara-Expedition report included a drawing of the frigate Novara surrounded by an oval border with the names of locations visited: Gibraltar, Madeira, Rio de Janeiro, Cape Town, St. Paul island, Ceylon, Madras, Nicobar Islands, Singapore, Batavia, Manila, Hong Kong, Shanghai, Puynipet Island, Stewart Island or Stuart Island (16-17 October 1858), Sydney (5 November 1858), Auckland, Tahiti, Valparaíso, Gravosa, and Triest (returning on 26 August 1859).

=== Gallery showing the differences before and after the 1862 rebuild ===
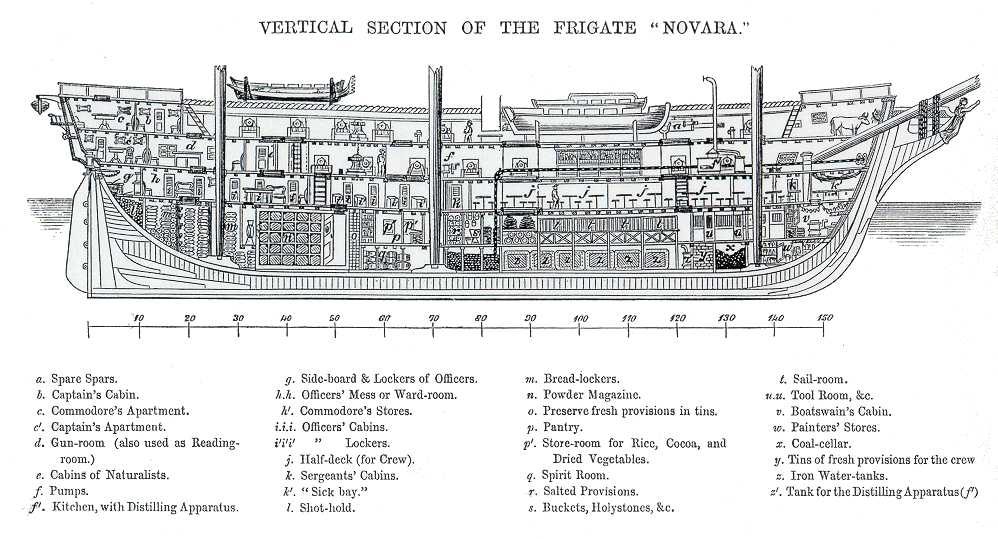
Novara, the original hull in cross-section

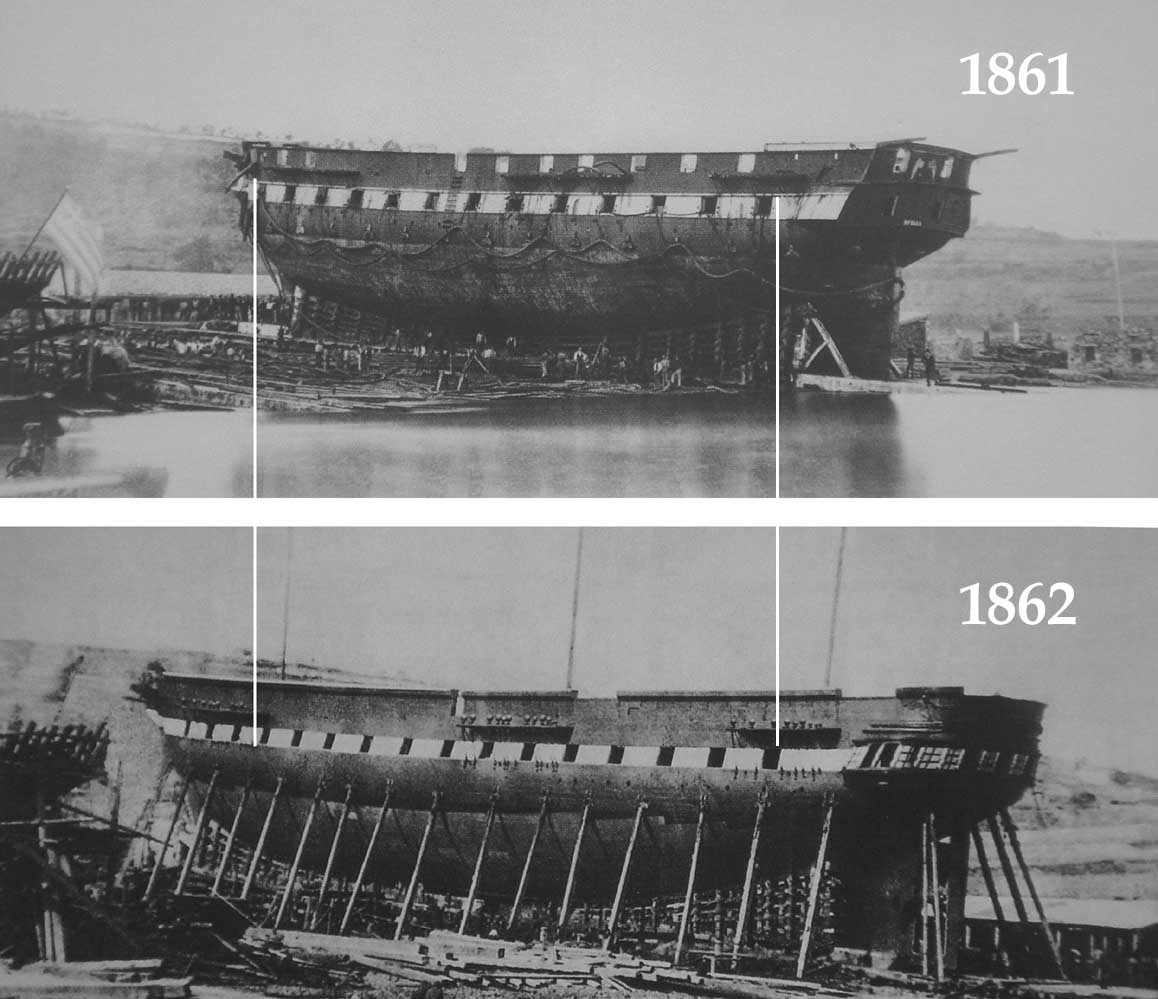
1861 vs 1862 hulls compared

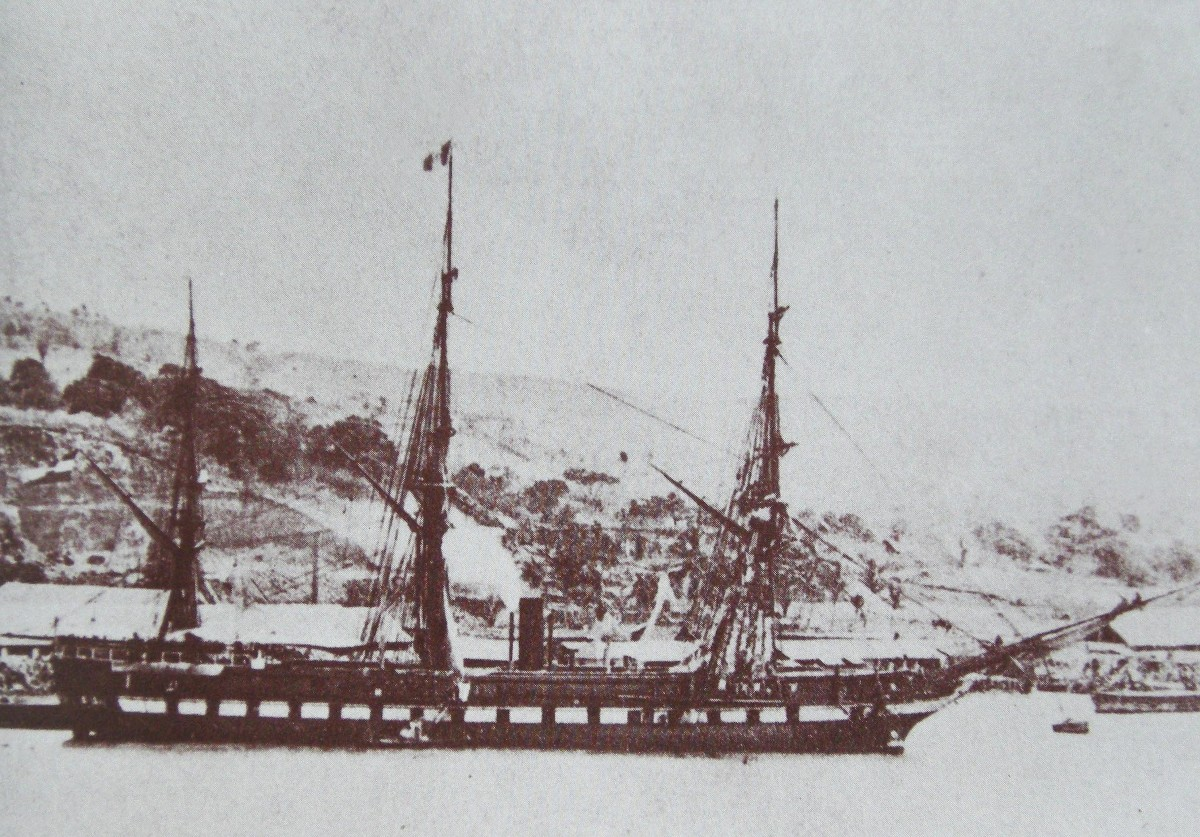
Novara in 1864 at Martinique

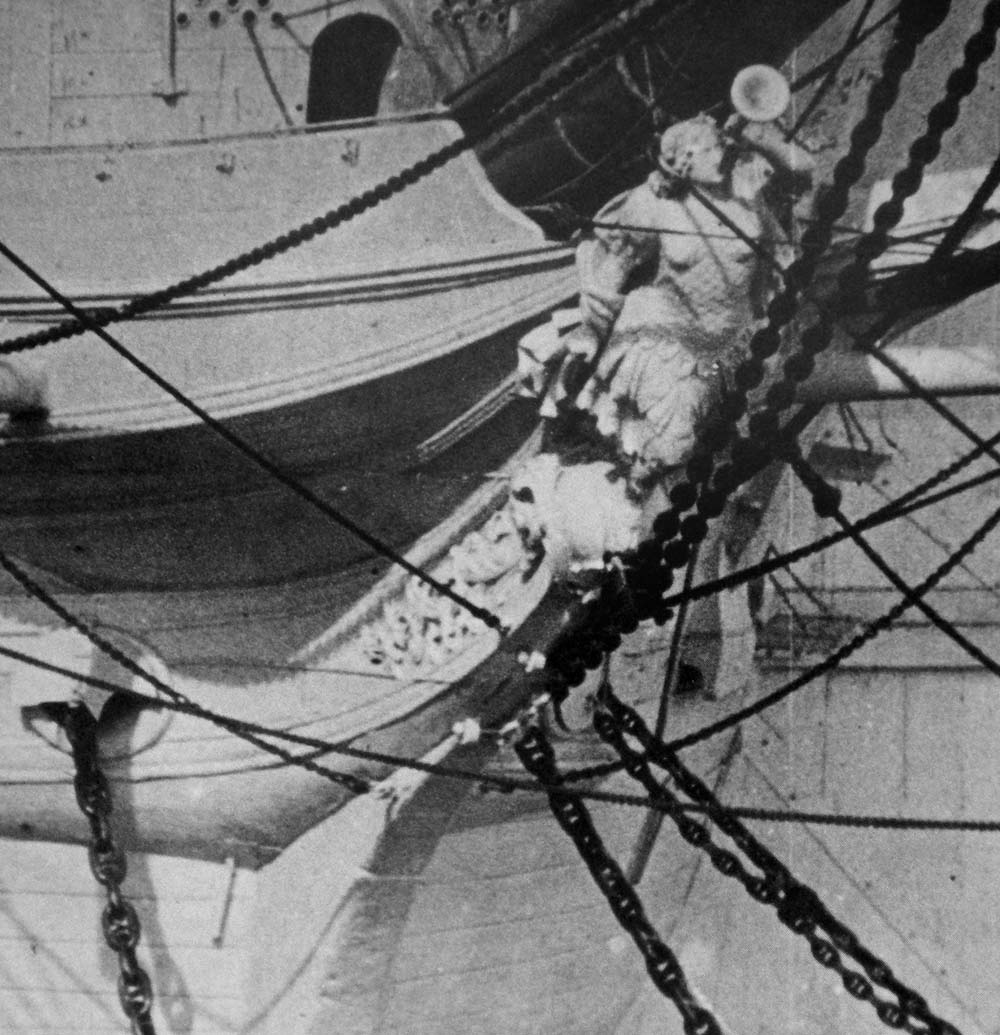
New and different figurehead

=== Voyages with Archduke Ferdinand Maximilian ===
In April 1864, Novara carried the Archduke Maximilian and his wife Charlotte to Veracruz, in the Americas, for their establishment as the new Emperor and Empress of Mexico during the Second Mexican Empire. Novara arrived at Veracruz, Mexico on 28 May 1864.

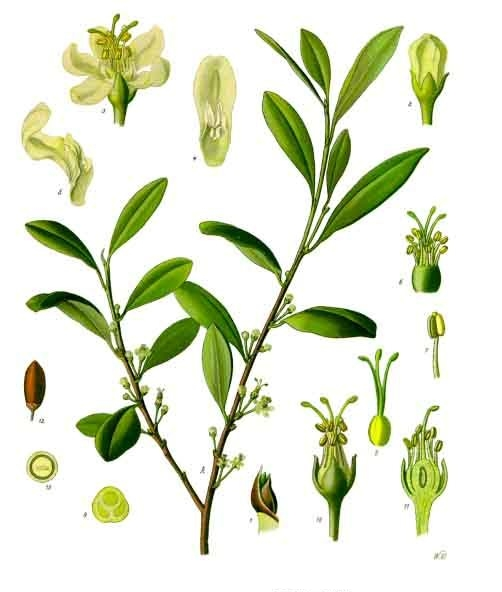
From Novara Expedition: Coca-plant

Over 3 years later, upon the capture and execution of Maximilian I of Mexico, by the constitutional Mexican government (of Benito Juárez), Admiral Wilhelm von Tegetthoff was sent with Novara to bring Maximilian's body home to Austria, arriving in the port of Trieste on 16 January 1868.

=== Battle of Lissa ===
Novara saw active service during the Battle of Lissa which took place on 20 July 1866 in the Adriatic Sea near the island of Vis (Italian: Lissa). Novara belonged to Admiral Wilhelm von Tegetthoff's 2nd Division, commanded by Baron Anton von Petz, which consisted mainly of wooden steam warships. Novara's commander, the Swedish naval officer Erik af Klint, was killed in the engagement. The battle was a decisive victory for an outnumbered Austrian Empire force over a superior Italian force. It was the first major sea battle between ironclads and one of the last to involve deliberate ramming.

=== Legacy ===
The Novara was hulked in 1881, being put into use as an immobilised training ship. The vessel was finally broken up eighteen years later.

S.M.S. Novara coin

Novara has left such a legacy behind that a depiction of her was selected for a commemorative coin: the 20 euro S.M.S. Novara coin minted on 16 June 2004. The obverse shows Novara under sail during her circumnavigation of the globe in 1857-1859. Novara was the first Austrian ship in the Austro-Hungarian Navy to circumnavigate the world. In the background, there is a representation of the Chinese coast. Seagulls, showing the nearness to land, circle the ship.

Approximately 30,000 copies of Karl von Scherzer's book on the circumnavigation of the world of the frigate Novara were sold, a huge number in that era. It is considered the second most successful popular scientific work in the German language in the 19th century; second only to Alexander von Humboldt's 5-volume Cosmography. An English edition was published shortly after, printed by Saunders, Otley and Co. in London in three volumes 1861-1863, containing more than 1200 pages. The complete title of the book is: Karl von Scherzer: "Narrative of the Circumnavigation of the Globe by the Austrian Frigate "Novara" (B. von Wullersdorf-Urbair,) Undertaken by Order of the Imperial Government, Under the Immediate Auspices of His I. and R. Highness the Archduke Ferdinand Maximilian, Commander in-Chief of the Austrian Navy."

== See also ==
- Imperial Natural History Museum, predeceding institution of the Naturhistorisches Museum.
- European and American voyages of scientific exploration
