= Erik af Klint (1816–1866) =

Swedish naval officer

- Born: Erik Johan Gustaf af Klint; 11 December 1816; Visby, Sweden
- Died: 20 July 1866 (aged 49)
- Military career
- Rank: Captain
- Commands: SMS Novara
- Conflicts: Third Italian War of Independence: Battle of Lissa

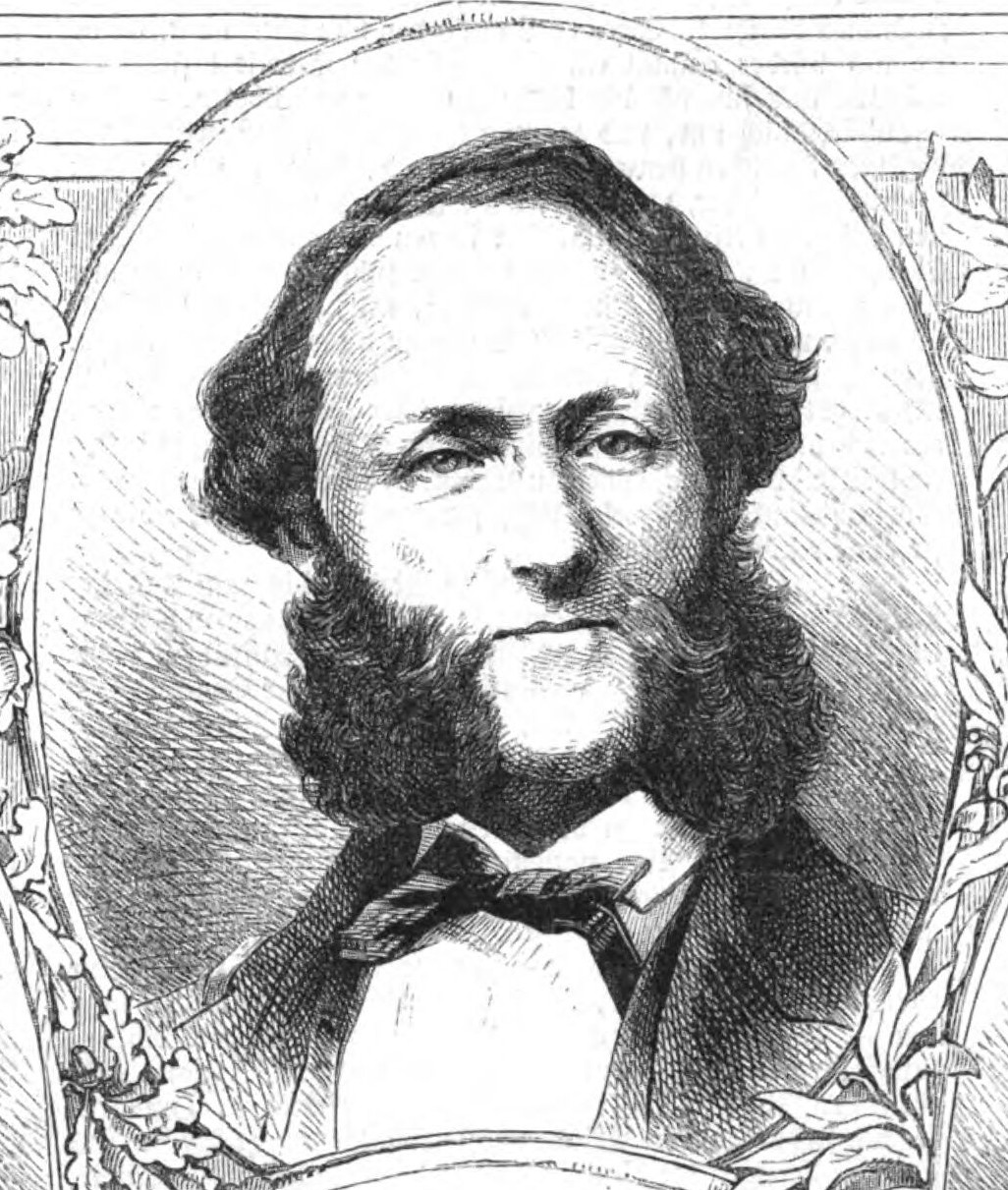

Erik Johan Gustaf af Klint (11 December 1816 – 20 July 1866) was a Swedish naval officer who also served in the Austrian Navy, reaching the rank of captain in the 1860s. He commanded the Austrian steam frigate SMS Novara at the Battle of Lissa on 20 July 1866, where he was killed in action.
