= Anton von Petz =

Anton Freiherr von Petz (21 January 1819, Venitze, Transylvania – 7 May 1885, Trieste) was an Austrian Navy officer.

In 1837, Petz graduated from the Imperial Naval Cadet School at Venice into the Imperial and Royal Navy, in which he attained the rank of vice admiral. He was created Knight of the Military Order of Maria Theresa.

He had a notable role during the Battle of Lissa in 1866, commanding the 2nd Division, which consisted of unarmored ships. He flew his flag aboard Kaiser, and during the battle his ship rammed the Italian ironclad Re di Portogallo. Later, in 1869, he undertook an expedition to the Far East and South America.

== Bibliography ==
- Christian Ortner: Der Seekrieg in der Adria 1866, in: Viribus Unitis, Jahresbericht 2010 des Heeresgeschichtlichen Museums. Wien 2011, S. 100–124, ISBN 978-3-902551-19-1 (in German)
- U. Schöndorfer: "Petz Anton Frh. von". In: Österreichisches Biographisches Lexikon 1815–1950 (ÖBL). Vol. 8, Austrian Academy of Sciences, Vienna 1983, ISBN 3-7001-0187-2, p. 14. (in German)
- Bayer v. Bayersburg, Heinrich, Österreichs Admirale, 2 Bde., Wien 1960/62 (in German)
