= Aurora-class corvette =

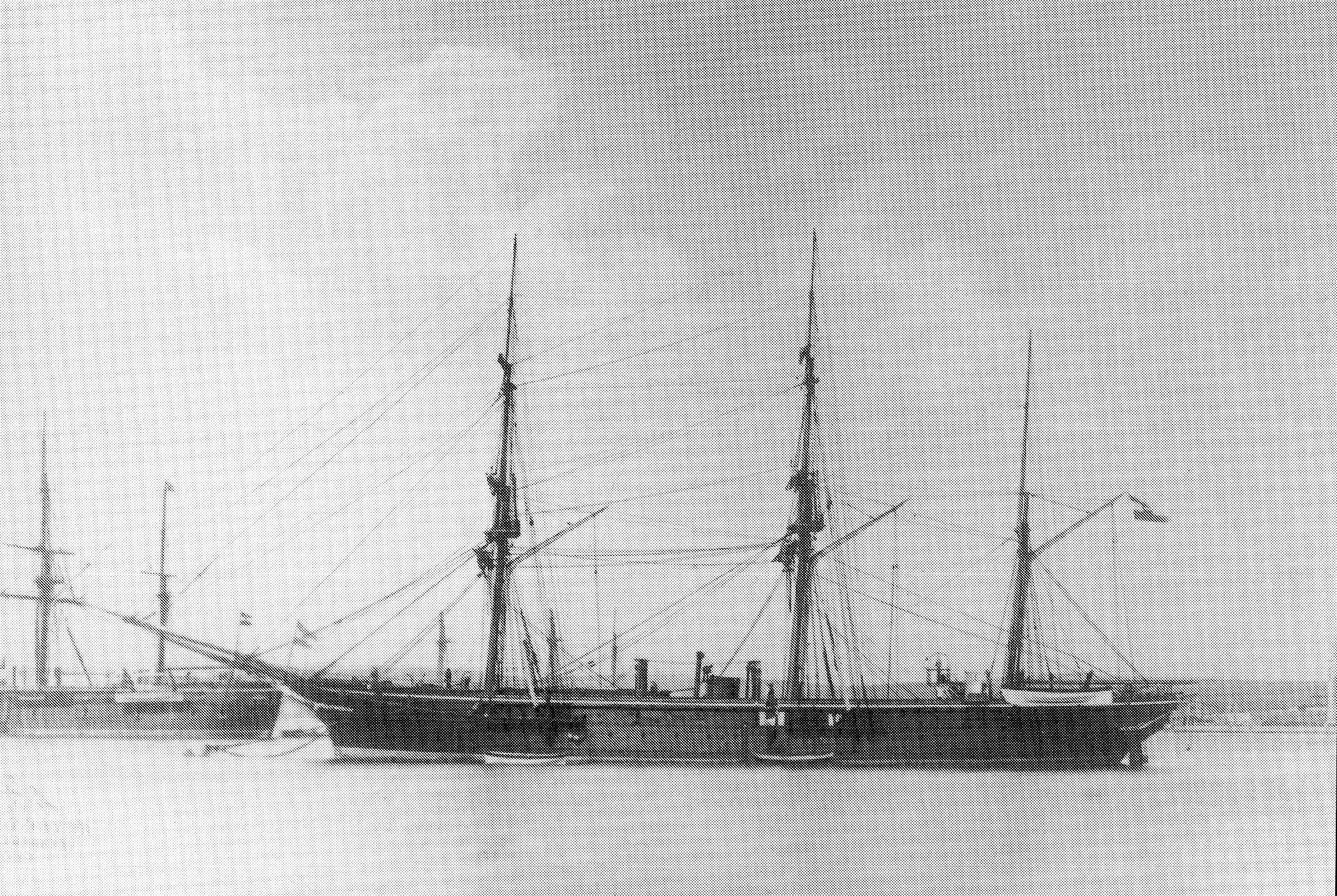
- Zrinyi in port

Class overview
- Operators: Austro-Hungarian Navy
- Preceded by: SMS Fasana
- Succeeded by: SMS Donau
- Built: 1870–1874
- In service: 1871–1905
- Completed: 3

General characteristics
- Type: Screw corvette
- Displacement: 1,353 long tons (1,375 t)
- Length: 69.08 m (226 ft 8 in)
- Beam: 10.45 m (34 ft 3 in)
- Draft: 5 m (16 ft 5 in)
- Installed power: 1,000 ihp (750 kW)
- Propulsion: 1 × triple-expansion steam engine; 1 × screw propeller
- Sail plan: Barque
- Speed: 11 knots (20 km/h; 13 mph)
- Complement: 210
- Armament: 4 × 15 cm (5.9 in) Wahrendorf Breech-loading guns; 2 × 7 cm (2.8 in) guns; 2 × 25 mm (1 in) machine guns

The Aurora class was a group of screw corvettes built for the Austro-Hungarian Navy in the early 1870s. The class comprised three ships: SMS Aurora, Frundsberg, and Zrinyi.

== Design ==
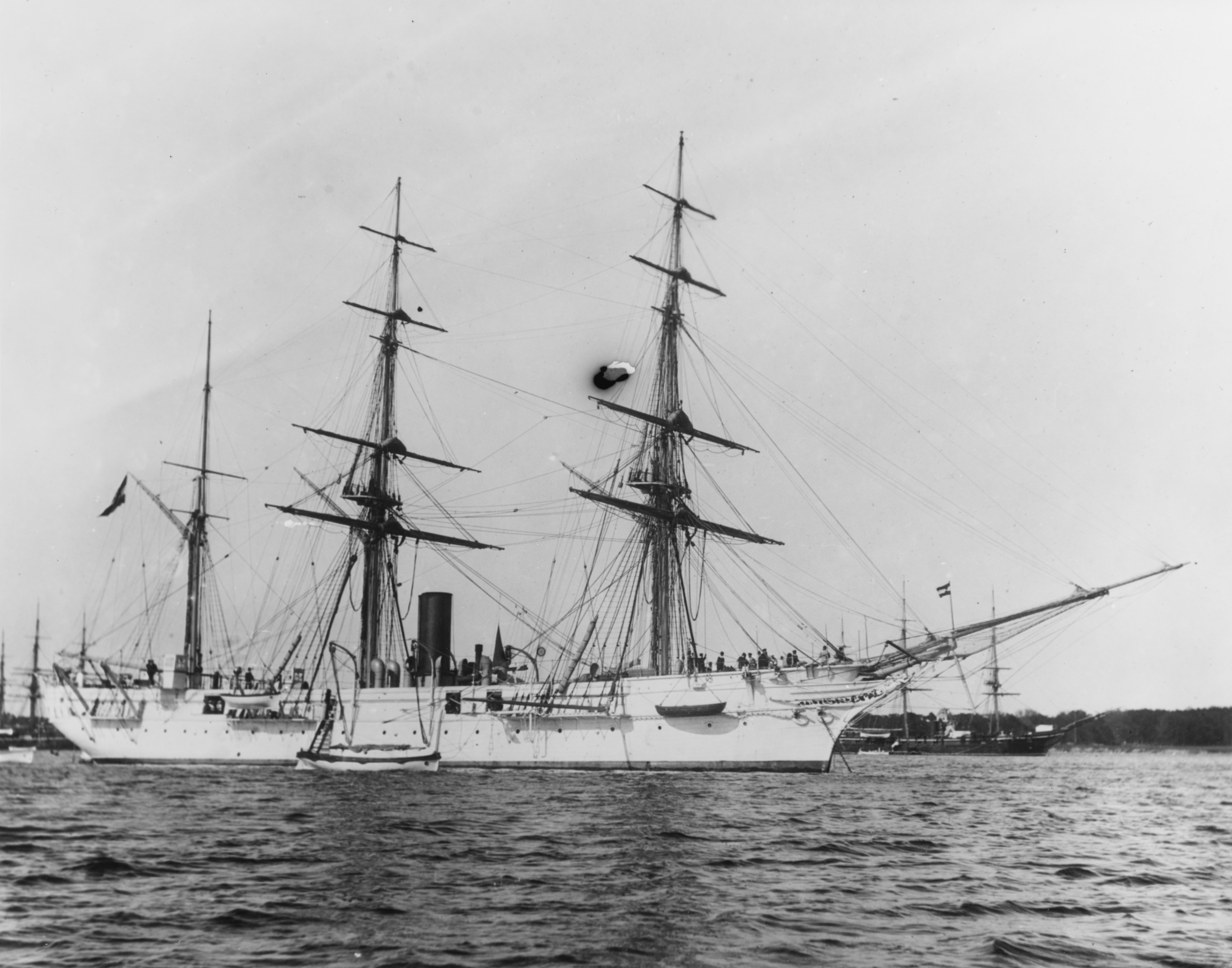
An unidentified member of the Aurora class, date unknown

Like other major navies in the 1850s, the Austrian Navy began building a series of screw frigates and corvettes (and converting existing vessels to steam power), but unlike their foreign contemporaries, the Austrian Empire neither had or sought an overseas colonial empire. Instead, the cruising vessels of the fleet were intended to be primarily used as training ships. The Aurora class, which the historians Erwin Sieche and Ferdinand Bilzer refer to as sloops, were part of this series.

The ships of the Aurora class were 69.08 m (226 ft 8 in) long overall and 59.1 m (193 ft 11 in) long between perpendiculars. They had a beam of 10.45 m (34 ft 3 in) and a draft of 5 m (16 ft 5 in). The ships had a displacement of 1,353 long tons (1,375 t). They had a flush deck and very minimal superstructure. Steering was controlled by a single rudder at the stern. Their crew numbered 210 officers and enlisted sailors.

The ships were powered by a single 2-cylinder, horizontal triple-expansion steam engine that drove a screw propeller. The number and type of boilers is not known, but smoke from the boilers was vented through a single funnel located amidships, between the fore- and main mast. The propulsion system was capable of generating 1,000 indicated horsepower (750 kW), for a top speed of 11 knots (20 km/h; 13 mph). On her initial sea trials, Aurora reached a top speed of 11.2 knots (20.7 km/h; 12.9 mph) from 1,165 ihp (869 kW); trials data for the other two ships has not survived. The ships were fitted with a three-masted barque sailing rig to supplement the steam engine on long voyages.

Aurora, Frundsberg, and Zrinyi were armed with a main battery of four 15 cm (5.9 in) Wahrendorf breechloading guns. The guns were mounted individually in sponsons in the sides of the hull. Two guns were placed just aft of the mainmast and the other pair were placed at the stern. The ships also carried a pair of 7 cm (2.8 in) guns and two 25 mm (0.98 in) machine guns. By 1891, the ships' armament had been revised significantly. Two of the 15 cm guns, one of the 7 cm guns, and both of the 25 mm machine guns were removed, and a new light battery of four 9 cm (3.5 in) guns and two 47 mm (1.9 in) Hotchkiss revolving cannon were installed.

== Ships ==
Name	Builder	Laid down	Launched	Completed
Aurora	Stabilimento Tecnico Triestino, Trieste	11 November 1871	20 November 1873	1 July 1874
Frundsberg	Stabilimento Tecnico Triestino, Trieste	19 June 1871	11 February 1873	October 1873
Zrinyi	Stabilimento Tecnico Triestino, Trieste	17 January 1870	10 December 1870	26 August 1871

== Service history ==
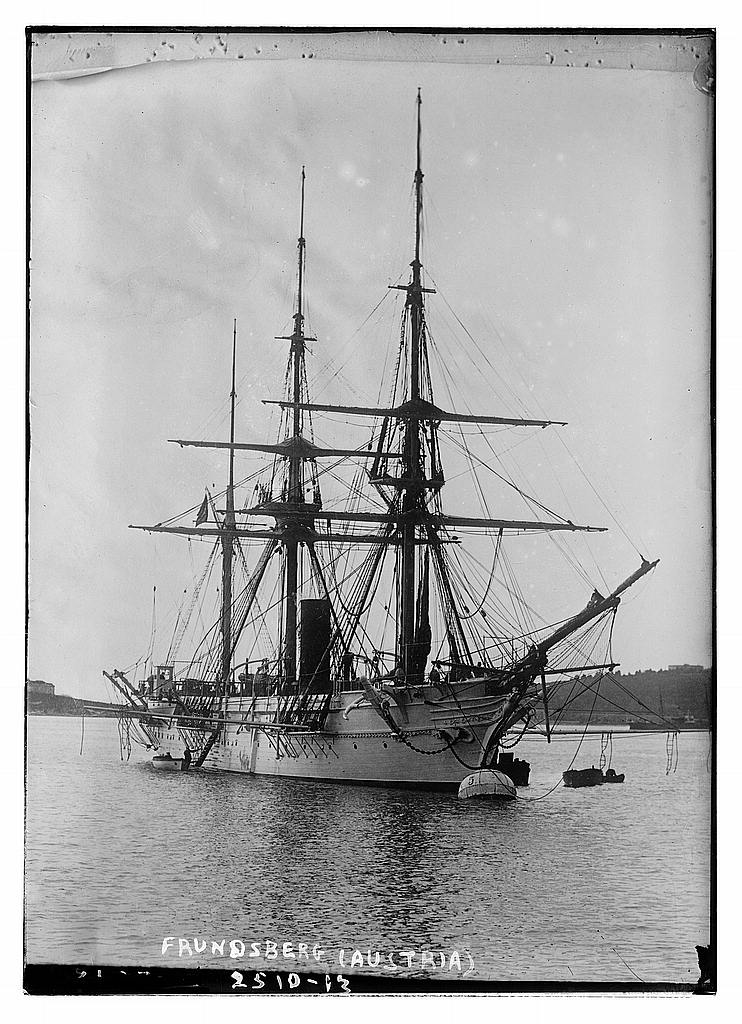
Frundsberg c. 1905
