= SMS Radetzky (1872) =

- Radetzky in port

History
- Name: Radetzky
- Builder: Stabilimento Tecnico Triestino, Trieste
- Laid down: September 1870
- Launched: 20 June 1872
- Completed: 10 August 1873

General characteristics
- Class & type: Radetzky-class frigate
- Displacement: 3,956 long tons (4,019 t)
- Length: 79.1 m (259 ft 6 in)
- Beam: 14.33 m (47 ft)
- Draft: 7 m (23 ft)
- Installed power: 3,385 ihp (2,524 kW)
- Propulsion: 1 × marine steam engine; 1 × screw propeller
- Speed: 13.37 knots (24.76 km/h; 15.39 mph)
- Complement: 450
- Armament: 15 × 15 cm (5.9 in) guns; 2 × 7 cm (2.8 in) guns; 4 × 47 mm (1.9 in) quick-firing guns; 3 × 47 mm (1.9 in) autocannon; 3 × 35 cm (13.8 in) torpedo tubes

SMS Radetzky was a screw frigate of the Austro-Hungarian Navy; she was the lead ship of the Radetzky class, which also included SMS Laudon. The ship was built in the early 1870s.

== Design ==
In the immediate aftermath of the Austro-Prussian War of 1866, Admiral Wilhelm von Tegetthoff had become the commander of the Austro-Hungarian Navy. In the late 1860s and early 1870s, he pushed for a significant expansion of the fleet, and in 1871, secured funding for the construction of two new screw frigates, among other new vessels. These frigates became the Radetzky class.

Radetzky was 79.1 m (259 ft 6 in) long overall, and she had a beam of 14.33 m (47 ft) and a draft of 7 m (23 ft). The ship had a displacement of 3,956 long tons (4,019 t) at full load. The ship had an iron frame with a wooden hull. Her crew numbered 450 officers and enlisted sailors.

The ship was powered by a single 2-cylinder marine steam engine that drove a screw propeller. The number and type of boilers is not known, but smoke from the boilers was vented through a single funnel located forward of amidships, between the fore- and main mast. The propulsion system was capable of generating 3,385 indicated horsepower (2,524 kW), for a top speed of 13.37 knots (24.76 km/h; 15.39 mph). The ship was fitted with a three-masted sailing rig to supplement the steam engine on long voyages.

Radetzky was armed with a main battery of fifteen 15 cm (5.9 in) RK 26-caliber guns manufactured by Krupp. She also carried a light battery that consisted of two 7 cm (2.8 in), 15-caliber guns, four 47 mm (1.9 in) quick-firing guns, and three 47 mm autocannon. In addition, she was fitted with three 35 cm (13.8 in) torpedo tubes; one was in the stern, and one on each broadside.

== Service history ==
Radetzky was built at the Stabilimento Tecnico Triestino shipyard in Trieste, beginning with her keel laying in September 1870. She was launched on 20 June 1872, and was completed on 10 August 1873. By the time the ship entered service, Admiral Friedrich von Pöck—Tegetthoff's successor—had instituted a policy of keeping very few ships in commission to keep operating costs to an absolute minimum. Radetzky was activated on 14 December 1873 to serve as the flagship of the active squadron for the 1874 training year, under the command of Rear Admiral Maximilian Daublebsky von Sterneck, who came aboard the ship on 21 December. The unit also included the ironclad Kaiser, the screw corvettes Fasana and Frundsberg, and the gunboat Velebich. After Radetzky suffered a machinery breakdown that necessitated lengthy repairs, Sterneck transferred his flag to Kaiser on 14 February 1874. Radetzky was placed in reserve while the repairs were carried out, which included the installation of a new piston. The ship was recommissioned on 16 July, and she initially cruised in the southern Adriatic Sea; on 2 August, she sailed to Gravosa, where she met Kaiser. Sterneck came back aboard Radetzky, which departed on 4 August to sail north to Trieste, arriving on 9 August.

The Spanish Navy offered to buy Radetzky and Laudon in 1879, but Pöck rejected the request. Following Pöck's replacement by Admiral Maximilian Daublebsky von Sterneck in 1884, the fleet took a more active role; for much of each year's training cycle, either Radetzky or Laudon would lead a division of a few unarmored vessels for operations in home waters.

In January 1886, a war scare between Greece and the Ottoman Empire prompted Britain to initiate an international effort to force Greece to back down; at that time, only Radetzky and a pair of wooden gunboats were in commission as the winter squadron, commanded by Captain Hermann von Spaun. The Austro-Hungarian fleet contributed a squadron initially composed of those three ships, but soon added the ironclad Kaiser Max, the torpedo cruiser Lussin, and six torpedo boats. After the Greeks refused to demobilize their army, the international naval force blockaded several ports in Greece. Radetzky and the other Austro-Hungarian ships were assigned the city of Volos. Greece eventually capitulated to international demands in June, allowing the Austro-Hungarian ships to withdraw by August.

In 1897, Radetzky was reduced to a gunnery training ship. She was renamed Adria in 1908 so her name could be used for the new pre-dreadnought battleship Radetzky. After the start of World War I, she was converted into a barracks ship in 1915 for German U-boat crews based in Pola. The ship's ultimate fate is unknown.
