= SMS Erzherzog Albrecht =

Ironclad warship of the Austro-Hungarian Navy

- Illustration of Erzherzog Albrecht, c. 1886

Class overview
- Preceded by: SMS Custoza
- Succeeded by: SMS Kaiser

History

Austro-Hungarian Empire
- Name: Erzherzog Albrecht
- Namesake: Archduke Albrecht
- Builder: Stabilimento Tecnico Triestino
- Laid down: 1 June 1870
- Launched: 24 April 1872
- Commissioned: June 1874
- Out of service: 1908
- Fate: Ceded to Italy, 1920

History

Italy
- Name: Buttafuoco
- Acquired: 1920
- Fate: Scrapped, 1950

General characteristics
- Type: Casemate ship
- Displacement: 5,980 long tons (6,080 t)
- Length: 87.87 m (288 ft 3 in) lwl; 89.69 m (294 ft 3 in) o/a
- Beam: 17.15 m (56 ft 3 in)
- Draft: 6.72 m (22 ft)
- Installed power: 3,969 indicated horsepower (2,960 kW)
- Propulsion: 1 × marine steam engine; 1 × screw
- Speed: 12.84 knots (23.78 km/h; 14.78 mph)
- Crew: 540
- Armament: 8 × 24 cm (9.4 in) guns; 6 × 9 cm (3.5 in) guns; 2 × 7 cm (2.8 in) guns
- Armor: Belt armor: 203 mm (8 in); Casemate: 177 mm (7 in)

SMS Erzherzog Albrecht was an ironclad warship built for the Austro-Hungarian Navy in the 1870s, the only member of her class. Her design was similar to the ironclad Custoza, but Erzherzog Albrecht was built to a smaller size; like Custoza, she was an iron-hulled casemate ship armed with a battery of eight heavy guns. The ship was laid down in June 1870, was launched in April 1872, and was commissioned in June 1874. The ship's service career was limited; tight naval budgets precluded an active fleet policy in the 1870s, which did not markedly improve in the 1880s. Her first period of active service came in 1881 and 1882, when she helped suppress a revolt in Cattaro Bay. In 1908, she was converted into a tender for the gunnery training school, having been renamed Feuerspeier. In 1915, she became a barracks ship, and after World War I ended in 1918, was ceded to Italy as a war prize. She was renamed Buttafuoco, served in the Italian Navy as a hulk through World War II before being scrapped in 1950.

== Design ==
In 1869, the Austro-Hungarian navy asked its foremost naval designer, Chief Engineer Josef von Romako, who had designed all of the earlier ironclad vessels, to prepare designs for two new ironclads. The first became the larger ironclad Custoza, and the second became Erzherzog Albrecht, built to a slightly smaller design owing to budgetary shortages. Romako incorporated the lessons of the Battle of Lissa of 1866, and decided the new ship should favor heavy armor and the capability of end-on fire to allow it to effectively attack with its ram. This required compromises in the number of guns and the power of the ship's machinery; to make up for carrying fewer guns, Romako adopted the same casemate ship design adopted with the previous vessel, Lissa. Unlike the wooden-hulled Lissa, however, Erzherzog Albrecht's hull would be constructed with iron; along with Custoza, they were the first iron-hulled ships of the Austro-Hungarian navy. Vice Admiral Wilhelm von Tegetthoff, the victor of Lissa, approved Romako's proposals for Erzherzog Albrecht and Custoza, allowing construction to begin.

=== General characteristics and machinery ===
Erzherzog Albrecht was 87.87 meters (288 ft 3 in) long at the waterline and 89.69 m (294 ft 3 in) long overall. She had a beam of 17.15 m (56 ft 3 in) and an average draft of 6.72 m (22 ft). The ship displaced 5,980 long tons (6,080 t). According to Conway's All the World's Fighting Ships, she was the second iron-built vessel to be built for the Austro-Hungarian fleet, but the historian R. F. Scheltema de Heere indicates she had a composite iron and wood hull. A small conning tower was built aft of the foremast. She had a crew of 540 officers and enlisted men.

Her propulsion system consisted of one single-expansion, horizontal, 2-cylinder steam engine that drove a single screw propeller that was 6.324 m (20.75 ft) in diameter. The engine was manufactured by Stabilimento Tecnico Triestino, the same shipyard that built the ship. Steam was provided by seven boilers with twenty-six fireboxes, which were trunked into a single funnel located amidships. Her engine produced a top speed of 12.84 knots (23.78 km/h; 14.78 mph) from 3,969 indicated horsepower (2,960 kW), though on speed trials conducted on 28 October 1874, she reached a speed of 13.38 knots (24.78 km/h; 15.40 mph) from 4,057 ihp (3,025 kW). The ship had a storage capacity of 467.9 long tons (475.4 t) of coal.

=== Armament and armor ===
Erzherzog Albrecht was armed with a main battery of eight 24-centimeter (9.4 in) 22-caliber breech-loading guns manufactured by Krupp's Essen Works. These were mounted in a central, armored battery that had two stories, four guns apiece, which allowed four guns to fire ahead or on the broadside, and two guns astern. She also carried several smaller guns, including six 9 cm (3.5 in) 24-caliber guns and two 7 cm (2.8 in) 15-caliber guns, all manufactured by Krupp. Later in her career, several small guns were added, including five 47-millimeter (1.9 in) Hotchkiss revolver cannon, four 47 mm 35-caliber quick-firing guns, and a pair of 25 mm (0.98 in) machine guns. She was also fitted with four 35 cm (14 in) torpedo tubes, with one in the bow, one on each broadside, and one in the stern.

The ship's armored belt was composed of wrought iron plate that was 203 mm (8 in) thick, and it was located at the waterline. The main battery casemate had 177 mm (7 in) of iron plating. The transverse bulkheads on either end of the casemate were 126 mm (5 in) thick.

== Service history ==
Erzherzog Albrecht as Feuerspeier sometime after 1899

The keel for Erzherzog Albrecht was laid down at the STT shipyard in Trieste on 1 June 1870. She was launched on 24 April 1872 and was completed in June 1874, less her armament, which was installed in the naval arsenal at Pola. Completion of the ship was delayed significantly by budgetary shortages, which slowed acquisition of armor plate from British manufacturers. Funding for the iron armor was approved in January 1871. Erzherzog Albrecht was finally completed in June 1874, and began sea trials on 27 October. The ironclad fleet, including Erzherzog Albrecht, was kept out of service in Pola, laid up in reserve; the only vessels to see significant service in the 1870s were several screw frigates sent abroad. In fact, she did not see active service until 1881. Late that year, Erzherzog Albrecht, the unarmored frigate Laudon, and several smaller vessels were sent to Cattaro Bay to help suppress a revolt there. During the operations, which concluded in March 1882, the ships bombarded rebel positions in the area.

The ship took part in fleet maneuvers in 1887, which included gunnery training. In June and July 1889, Erzherzog Albrecht served as the flagship during fleet training exercises, which also included the ironclads Custoza, Tegetthoff, Kaiser Max, Prinz Eugen, and Don Juan d'Austria. The ship remained in service until 1908, when she was converted into a tender for the gunnery school. Renamed Feuerspeier, she served in this capacity until October 1915, when during World War I she was repurposed for use as a barracks ship for German naval personnel operating U-boats in the Adriatic Sea. After the Central Powers lost the war in November 1918, Erzherzog Albrecht was ceded to Italy as a war prize under the terms of the Treaty of Saint-Germain-en-Laye. She was renamed Buttafuoco and served as a hulk in the Italian fleet; she survived World War II and was eventually broken up for scrap beginning in 1950.
