= Frundsberg =

Frundsberg may refer to:

- SMS Frundsberg, an Austro-Hungarian corvette
- 10th SS Panzer Division Frundsberg

== People with the surname ==
- Georg von Frundsberg
