= SMS Fasana =

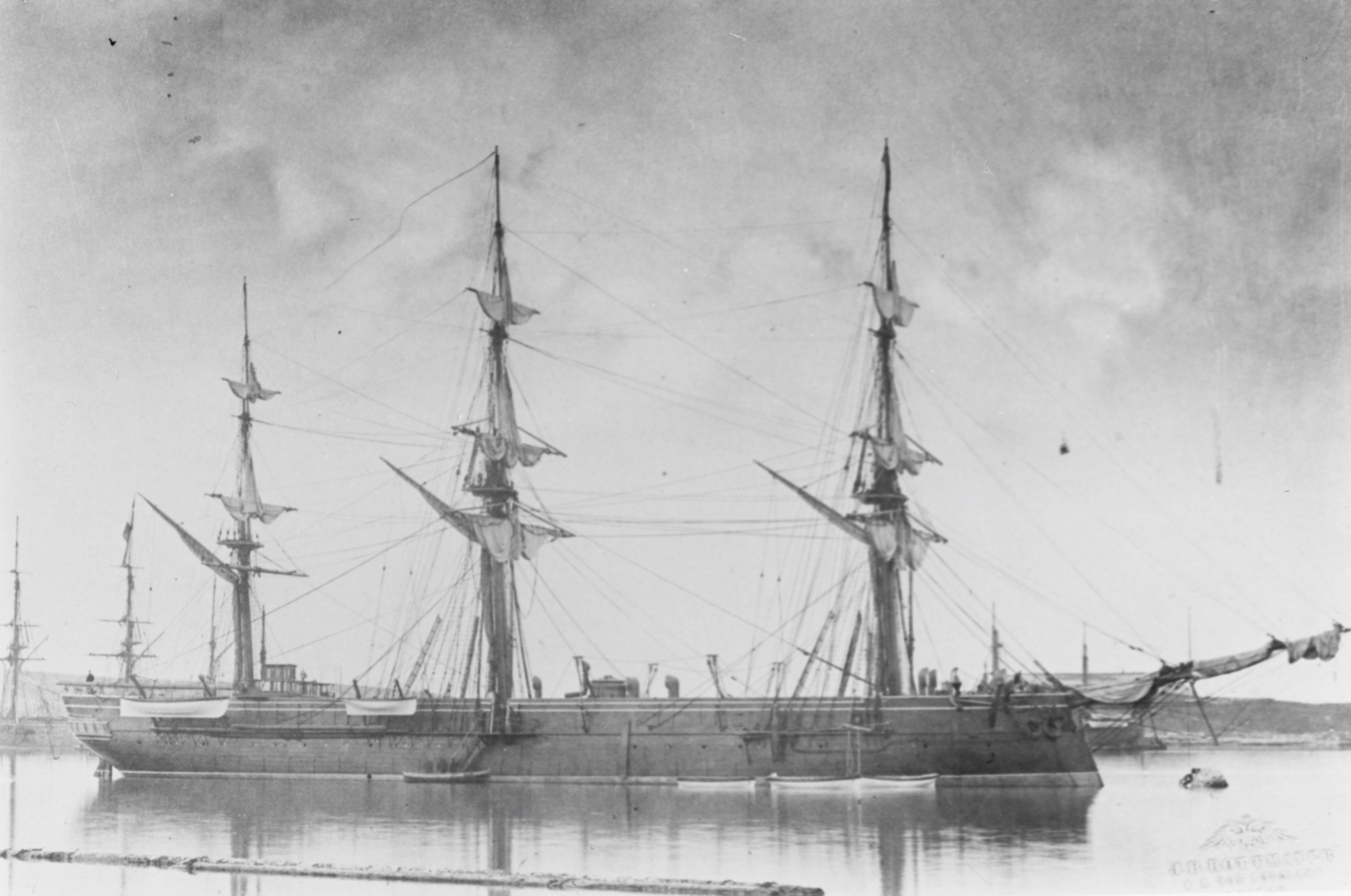
- Fasana in port

Class overview
- Operators: Austro-Hungarian Navy
- Preceded by: SMS Helgoland
- Succeeded by: Aurora class

History
- Name: Fasana
- Builder: Navale Adriatico, Trieste
- Laid down: 9 October 1869
- Launched: 1 September 1870
- Completed: 5 May 1871
- Decommissioned: 1896
- Renamed: Gamma, 7 August 1902
- Stricken: 7 August 1897
- Fate: Scrapped, 1920

General characteristics
- Type: Screw corvette
- Displacement: 2,382 long tons (2,420 t)
- Length: 68.26 m (223 ft 11 in)
- Beam: 11.69 m (38 ft 4 in)
- Draft: 5.78 m (19 ft)
- Installed power: 1,590 ihp (1,190 kW)
- Propulsion: 1 × marine steam engine; 1 × screw propeller
- Speed: 11.58 knots (21.45 km/h; 13.33 mph)
- Complement: 257
- Armament: 2 × 21 cm (8.3 in) Krupp guns; 4 × 8-pounder guns

SMS Fasana was a screw corvette of the Austro-Hungarian Navy built in the late 1860s and early 1870s, the only member of her class.

== Design ==
Fasana was a screw corvette, sometimes referred to as a sloop, of the Austro-Hungarian Navy. She was 68.26 m (223 ft 11 in) long overall, with a beam of 11.69 m (38 ft 4 in) and a draft of 5.78 m (19 ft). The ship had a displacement of 2,382 long tons (2,420 t). The ship had an inverted bow and an overhanging stern. Her crew numbered 257 officers and enlisted sailors.

The ship was powered by a single 2-cylinder, horizontal marine steam engine that drove a screw propeller. The number and type of boilers is not known, but smoke from the boilers was vented through a single funnel located amidships, between the fore- and main mast. The propulsion system was capable of generating 1,590 indicated horsepower (1,190 kW), for a top speed of 11.58 knots (21.45 km/h; 13.33 mph). The ship was fitted with a three-masted sailing rig to supplement the steam engine on long voyages.

Fasana was armed with a main battery of two 21 cm (8.3 in) 20-caliber breechloading guns manufactured by Krupp. She also carried four 8-pounder guns. By 1880, the ship had been rearmed entirely. She was then armed with four 15 cm (5.9 in), 26-caliber Krupp guns and three 7 cm (2.8 in), 15-caliber guns.

== Service history ==
=== Construction and Far East cruise ===
The keel for Fasana was laid down at the Navale Adriatico shipyard in Trieste on 9 October 1869, and she was launched on 1 September 1870. The ship was completed on 5 May 1871, and was commissioned that year. Upon entering service, Fasana was ordered to cruise to East Asia, in part to deliver the ratified treaties that had been agreed upon during an earlier diplomatic mission in 1869. Fasana sailed from Pola on 4 July and returned to Trieste to make preparations for the voyage. On the night of 7–8 August, she got underway, bound for Asia. She passed through Pelagosa on the way through the Adriatic Sea, and by 18 July, she had reached Port Said, Egypt. There, she entered the Suez Canal; she left the other end of the canal at Suez on 22 July, sailing for Aden. She eventually arrived there on 19 August, and she remained there until 25 August, when the ship departed to cross the Indian Ocean. She reached Singapore on 20 September and replenished her coal stocks there. While on the way to China, the ship was struck by a typhoon, though she suffered little damage.

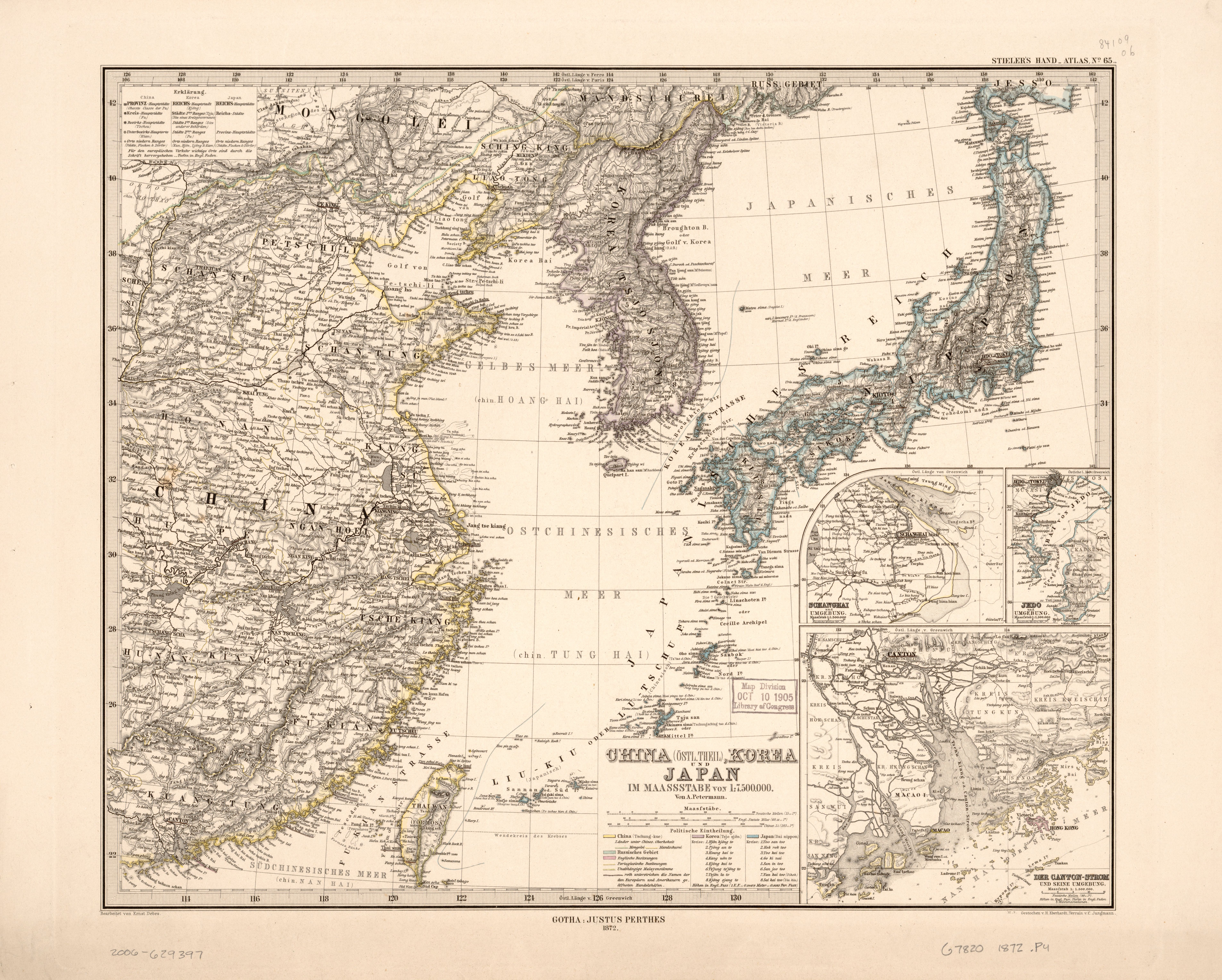
1872 map of China, Japan, and Korea

On 8 October, she reached Xiamen, China. Three days later, she moved to Hong Kong, where she met the German frigate SMS Hertha, the Danish frigate HDMS Tordenskjold, and the British gunboats HMS Curlew and Thistle. Fasana lay at Hong Kong through 21 October, and during that time, she underwent repairs to her machinery and rigging. She departed the following morning to sail north to Shanghai, arriving there four days later. There, she joined the frigate HMS Juno and the American vessels USS Benicia and Monocacy. On 8 December, the Austro-Hungarian ambassador Heinrich von Calice came aboard Fasana to be taken to Japan. She arrived in Nagasaki, Japan, on 14 December, where a number of foreign warships were also at anchor, including the Italian corvette Vettor Pisani. Fasana still had aboard a Chinese harbor pilot from Shanghai, and Vettor Pisani had a Japanese translator from Yokohama; the two ships exchanged the men, as Vettor Pisani would soon depart for Shanghai. Fasana then toured several Japanese ports, including Hirado, Shimonoseki, and Kobe. While in Kobe, Calice and the ship's captain met with the governor of Hyōgo Prefecture. On 30 December, Fasana moved to Yokohama; the ship was drydocked at the Yokosuka Naval Arsenal for repairs that lasted from 6 to 20 January 1872.

While the ship was under repair, Calice and the ship's command staff traveled to meet Emperor Mutsuhito in a ceremony marking the formal exchange of ratifications of the trade agreement previously negotiated. Fasana left Yokohama on 25 January, sailing south to visit the Philippines. She passed through the Batanes islands on 3–4 February, and by 9 February, she had reached the capital at Manila. After a stay of six days, she left on 15 February, bound for Saigon in French Cochinchina. After arriving there on 20 February, she remained in port for four days before departing to cruise along the coast of Cambodia. The ship then turned south and toured several islands in the Dutch East Indies, which culminated with a stop at the colonial capital at Batavia from 4 to 11 March. Fasana then sailed west to Singapore, and from there, she continued on to Siam, where Calice was to exchange ratifications with King Chulalongkorn. The ship arrived in Siam on 21 April, and her commander and Calice met with the king twice, on 27 and 29 April. The ship remained in Siam until 9 May.

Fasana thereafter cruised back north to Chinese waters. Along the way, she entered the Pearl River at Guangzhou on 25 May before continuing north on 2 June. She made stops in Hong Kong, Xiamen, Fuzhou, and Yantai over the course of June and early July. The ship left the last port on 18 July to return to Japanese waters, which included stops in Yokohama and Kagoshima, among others. Fasana stayed in Yokohama until 4 September, and she then left to visit a number of other Japanese ports, including Kobe, Mihara, Himeshima, and Nagasaki. While in the latter port, Calice informed the ship's captain that Fasana was to carry Siam's contribution to the 1873 Vienna World's Fair. The captain decided to wait in Nagasaki until the beginning of the northeast monsoons before sailing for Singapore, and in that time, the crew made repairs to the ship's rigging. Fasana got underway on 6 October, arriving in Singapore late on 29 October. She remained there until 14 November, when she sailed to begin the voyage home. Along the way, she stopped in Penang, Malaya; Galle, British Ceylon; and numerous ports along India's western coast including Kochi and Bombay. By 1 February 1873, Fasana had reached the British Aden Colony near the mouth of the Red Sea.

The ship proceeded up the Red Sea and arrived at Suez on 19 February, and over the following days, she passed through canal. While at Port Said, the crew repainted the ship, which had not been done since she had left Nagasaki. She got underway again on 1 March; heavy storms forced her to seek shelter at Navarino Bay on 15 March. She sailed again the next day, and eventually arrived in Pola late on 23 March. There, her crew was transferred and Fasana was placed in reserve for repairs. She was recommissioned on 5 July and assigned to the active squadron.

=== Operations off Spain ===
Fasana served in the active squadron in 1873, recommissioning on 5 July; at that time, the squadron also included the ironclad Lissa, which served as the squadron flagship, the screw corvette Zrinyi and the gunboat Velebich. On 18 August, Fasana was ordered to join Velebich off Spain, as a result of the Cantonal Revolution against the Spanish government. She departed Pola the following day, and arrived in Barcelona, Spain on 10 September. There, she met a number of other foreign warships, including a sizeable Italian squadron centered on the ironclads Roma and San Martino; also present were the French ironclad Jeanne d'Arc, the British ironclad HMS Pallas and corvette Rapid, and the United States frigate USS Wabash. Fasana went to sea on 6 October for shooting practice; the next day, she moved to Tarragona, where she met Velebich. By 8 October, Fasana had shifted to Valencia, where a squadron of Spanish rebel warships was expected to arrive. Several of the British, French, and Italian ironclads had also moved there, and their commanders discussed the possibility of joint action against the rebels. The latter squadron, consisting of the ironclads Tetuán, Numancia, and Méndez Núñez seized several Spanish-government-flagged merchant ships off Valencia between 18 and 21 October, but left without engaging the other European vessels. As the rebels departed for Cartagena, the neutral ironclads followed them, and Fasana sailed at a distance to observe. After the rebels entered Cartagena, Fasana sailed on to Gibraltar on 24 October.

The ship left Gibraltar on 5 November and returned to Spain, initially to Málaga, and then continuing on to Barcelona and later Cartagena by early December. Fasana returned to Barcelona on 11 December, where she remained for the next several months. From 8 to 9 January 1874, she sent a landing party ashore to guard the Austro-Hungarian consulate during fighting in the city. By February, the active squadron saw a reshuffling of most of the other vessels in the unit, and was now under the command of Rear Admiral Maximilian Daublebsky von Sterneck. At that time, the squadron also included the ironclad Kaiser, the screw frigate Radetzky, the screw corvette Frundsberg, and Velebich. Most of the ships were stationed in Pola in February, though Fasana and Velebich were still in Spanish waters at the time. Frundsberg, Kaiser, and the gunboat Dalmat were all sent to join them there in the coming weeks. On the morning of 5 March, Kaiser joined Fasana in Barcelona, and Frundsberg arrived later that day. Dalmat reached the port soon thereafter. Sterneck came aboard Fasana to inspect the vessel between 9 and 13 March. The four ships conducted shooting practice together while in the area. From 7 to 9 April, Frundsberg and Kaiser joined Fasana to conduct two days of tactical maneuvers. Fasana thereafter detached from the squadron to return to Gibraltar. While there, she conducted shooting practice. On 8 May, the ship made a brief cruise into the Atlantic before returning to Gibraltar on 19 May. Fasana left for home on 22 May, and after a stop in Messina on 2 June, arrived in Pola on 14 June. She was decommissioned there six days later.

=== Later career ===
Fasana embarked on an overseas training cruise in 1881 to visit a number of countries in North and South America; she had aboard the graduating class of naval cadets aboard for the voyage. In 1887, Fasana made another voyage abroad, passing through the Suez Canal to visit the Persian Gulf, the East Indies, and various ports in East Asia. She returned home in 1888, and during this voyage, Archduke Leopold Ferdinand served aboard the ship as a cadet. The ship conducted the fourth Austro-Hungarian circumnavigation of the globe in 1889–1890. Fasana embarked on another cruise to the Pacific from 1893 to 1895, which included stops in India and Australia. Fasana was decommissioned in 1896, and was struck from the naval register on 7 August 1897. She was then converted into a storage hulk. She was renamed Gamma on 7 August 1902, and was thereafter used to store naval mines. She served in this role through World War I, based at Pola, and following Austria-Hungary's defeat in 1918, she was surrendered as a war prize and probably broken up in Italy in 1920.
