= SMS Aurora =

- Aurora, with her funnel retracted, date unknown

History

Austro-Hungarian Empire
- Name: Aurora
- Builder: Stabilimento Tecnico Triestino, Trieste
- Laid down: 11 November 1871
- Launched: 20 November 1873
- Completed: 1 July 1874
- Fate: Ceded to Yugoslavia, 1920

General characteristics
- Class & type: Aurora-class corvette
- Displacement: 1,353 long tons (1,375 t)
- Length: 69.08 m (226 ft 8 in)
- Beam: 10.45 m (34 ft 3 in)
- Draft: 5 m (16 ft 5 in)
- Installed power: 1,000 ihp (750 kW)
- Propulsion: 1 × triple-expansion steam engine; 1 × screw propeller
- Sail plan: Barque
- Speed: 11 knots (20 km/h; 13 mph)
- Complement: 210
- Armament: 4 × 15 cm (5.9 in) Wahrendorf Breech-loading guns; 2 × 7 cm (2.8 in) guns; 2 × 25 mm (1 in) machine guns

SMS Aurora was a screw corvette of the Austro-Hungarian Navy built in the early 1870s; she was the lead ship of the Aurora class.

== Design ==
Aurora was an Aurora-class corvette, sometimes referred to as sloops, of the Austro-Hungarian Navy. She was 69.08 m (226 ft 8 in) long overall and 59.1 m (193 ft 11 in) long between perpendiculars. She had a beam of 10.45 m (34 ft 3 in) and a draft of 5 m (16 ft 5 in). The ship had a displacement of 1,353 long tons (1,375 t). Her crew numbered 210 officers and enlisted sailors.

The ship was powered by a single triple-expansion steam engine that drove a screw propeller. The number and type of boilers is not known, but smoke from the boilers was vented through a single funnel located amidships, between the fore- and main mast. The propulsion system was capable of generating 1,000 indicated horsepower (750 kW), for a top speed of 11 knots (20 km/h; 13 mph). On her initial sea trials, Aurora reached a top speed of 11.2 knots (20.7 km/h; 12.9 mph) from 1,165 ihp (869 kW). The ship was fitted with a three-masted sailing rig to supplement the steam engine on long voyages.

Aurora was armed with a main battery of four 15 cm (5.9 in) Wahrendorf breechloading guns. She also carried a pair of 7 cm (2.8 in) guns and two 25 mm (0.98 in) machine guns. By 1891, the ship's armament had been revised significantly. Two of the 15 cm guns, one of the 7 cm guns, and both of the 25 mm machine guns were removed, and a new light battery of four 9 cm (3.5 in) guns and two 47 mm (1.9 in) Hotchkiss revolving cannon were installed.

== Service history ==
Aurora firing a salute

The keel for Aurora was laid down at the Stabilimento Tecnico Triestino on 11 November 1871, and she was launched on 20 November 1873, the last member of her class to be launched. The ship was completed on 1 July 1874.

Aurora went on a cruise to South America in 1884, visiting many ports in the region before returning to Pola in 1885. During the cruise, she made stops in Brazil and the Canary Islands, along with Argentina and Uruguay. The following year, she began a lengthy voyage to East Asia, which lasted into 1889. One of her chief responsibilities during the cruise was to determine whether Austro-Hungarian merchant vessels should extend their routes to ports beyond Hong Kong. Aurora's mission helped the shipping companies decide to extend their routes to Japan in 1891. Aurora and the gunboat Nautilus conducted extensive surveys and scientific research in the region during this period, building on the knowledge gained during the Novara Expedition.

After a brief return home in 1899, Aurora immediately went on another cruise abroad, this time through the Suez Canal to East Africa and the Indian Ocean. During the voyage, which lasted into 1890, the ship was commanded by Captain Rudolf Montecuccoli. The ship embarked on a lengthy deployment to East Asia in 1895; at that time, Austria-Hungary adopted a policy to station at least two warships in the region at all times. Aurora joined the corvette Saida there, and returned home in 1896.

In 1902, Aurora was reduced to a storage hulk, later being used to store naval mines in Sebenico. After Austria-Hungary's defeat in World War I in 1918, the Austro-Hungarian fleet was divided between the victorious Allied powers, and Aurora was allocated to the Royal Yugoslav Navy in 1920. She was renamed Skradin while in Yugoslav service. Her ultimate fate is unknown.
