= SMS Lissa =

Ironclad warship of the Austro-Hungarian Navy

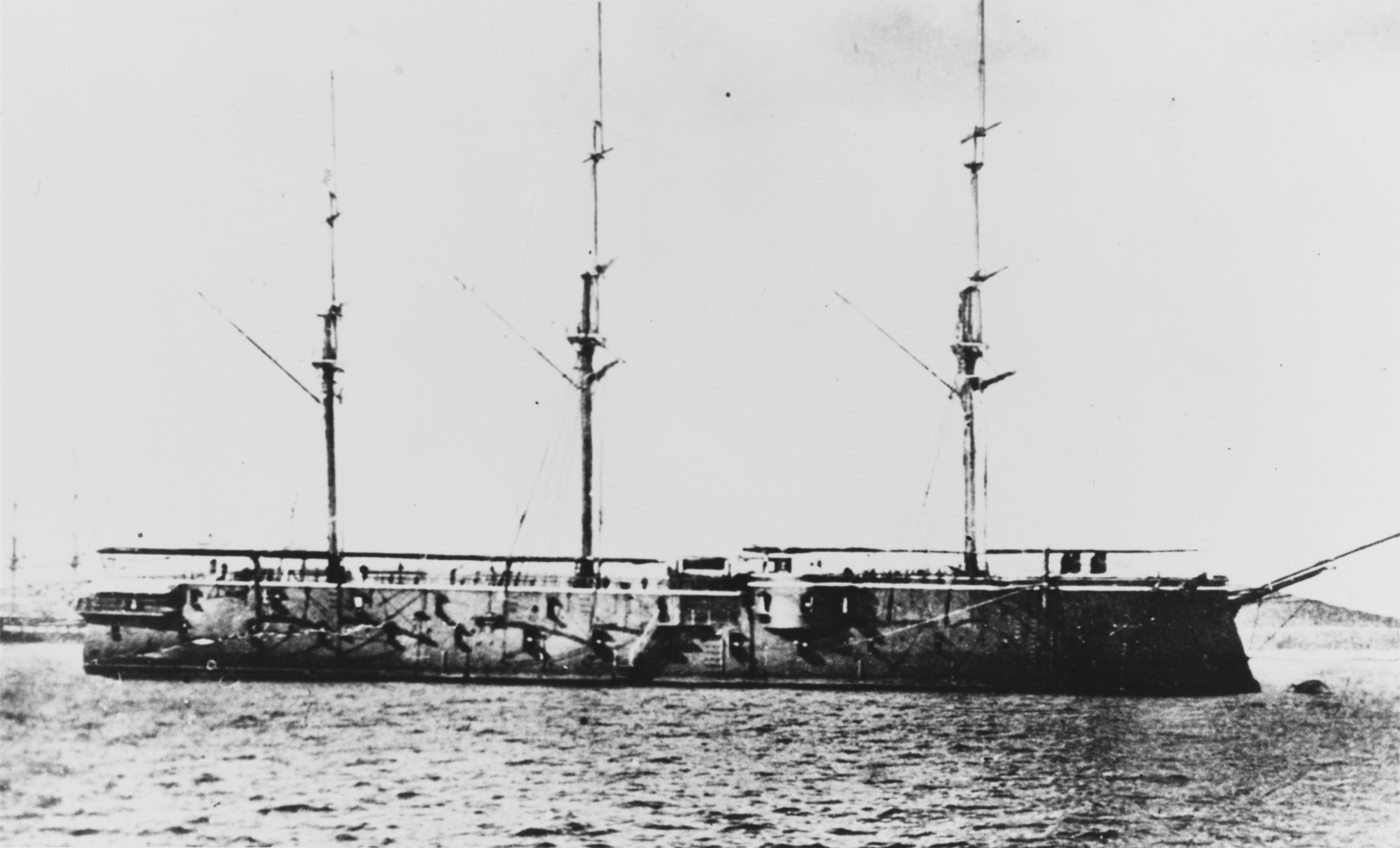
- Lissa sometime before 1875

Class overview
- Preceded by: Erzherzog Ferdinand Max class
- Succeeded by: SMS Custoza

History

Austro-Hungarian Empire
- Name: Lissa
- Namesake: Battle of Lissa
- Laid down: 27 June 1867
- Launched: 25 February 1869
- Commissioned: May 1871
- Stricken: 13 November 1892
- Fate: Scrapped, 1893–1895

General characteristics
- Type: Casemate ship
- Displacement: 7,086 long tons (7,200 t)
- Length: 89.38 m (293 ft 3 in) oa
- Beam: 17.32 m (56 ft 10 in)
- Draft: 8.5 m (27 ft 11 in)
- Installed power: 3,619 indicated horsepower (2,699 kW)
- Propulsion: 1 × marine steam engine; 1 × screw propeller
- Speed: 12.83 knots (23.76 km/h; 14.76 mph)
- Crew: 620
- Armament: 12 × 9-inch (229 mm) guns; 4 × 8-pounder guns; 3 × 3-pounder guns
- Armor: Side: 152 mm (6 in); Casemate: 127 mm (5 in); Bulkheads: 114 mm (4.5 in)

SMS Lissa, named for the Battle of Lissa, was a unique ironclad warship built for the Austro-Hungarian Navy in the 1860s and 1870s, the only member of her class. She was the first casemate ship built for Austria-Hungary, she was armed with a main battery of twelve 9-inch (229 mm) guns in a central armored casemate, unlike the earlier broadside ironclads. Construction of the ship lasted from June 1867 to May 1871, and was delayed by budgetary shortfalls; the lack of funding also plagued the ship during her career, preventing her from taking an active role in the fleet. She spent the majority of her time in service laid up in Pola, apart from a lengthy reconstruction in 1880–1881. Lissa was ultimately stricken from the fleet in 1892 and broken up for scrap starting the following year.

== Design ==
=== General characteristics and machinery ===
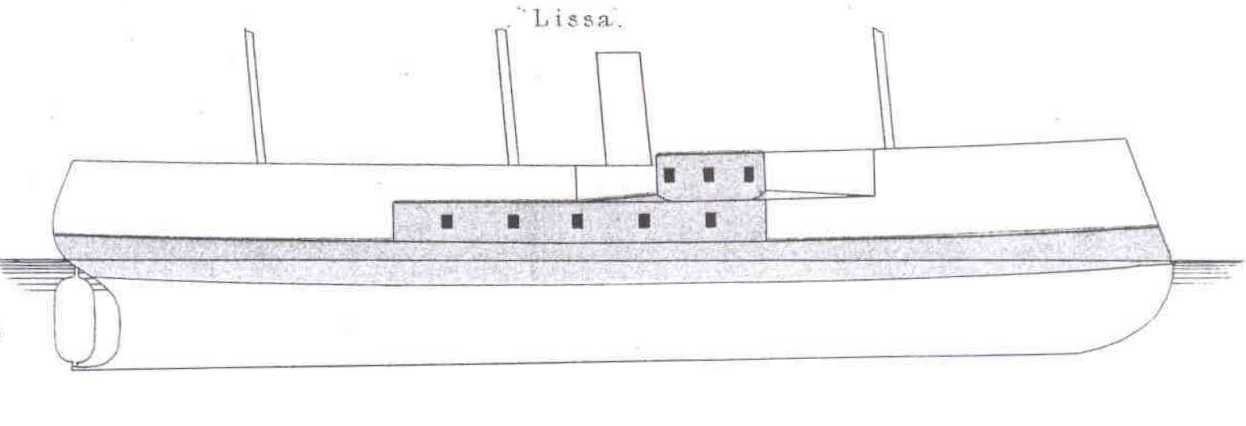
Line-drawing of Lissa

Lissa was 86.76 meters (284 ft 8 in) long at the waterline and 89.38 m (293 ft 3 in) long overall. She had a beam of 17.32 m (56 ft 10 in) and an average draft of 8.5 m (27 ft 11 in). Her draft was fairly deep compared to other Austro-Hungarian ironclads of the time. She displaced 7,086 long tons (7,200 t). Her hull and most of the upper works, including the casemate, were wooden with iron plating attached, though the sides on either end of the casemate were iron-built. The ship was fitted with a ram bow. She had a crew of 620 officers and enlisted men.

Her propulsion system consisted of one single-expansion, horizontal, 2-cylinder steam engine that drove a single screw propeller that was 6.62 m (21.7 ft) in diameter. Steam was provided by seven boilers with thirty fireboxes; the boilers were trunked into a single funnel located amidships. Her engine produced a top speed of 12.83 knots (23.76 km/h; 14.76 mph) from 3,619 indicated horsepower (2,699 kW), though on speed trials conducted on 9 May 1871, the ship reached a speed of 13.29 knots (24.61 km/h; 15.29 mph) from 3,663 ihp (2,731 kW). At top speed, the ship had a cruising radius of 1,420 nautical miles (2,630 km; 1,630 mi). To supplement the steam engine, Lissa was originally fitted with a full ship rig with 3,112 square meters (33,500 sq ft). In 1886, her rigging was cut down significantly to 1,404 m^{2} (15,110 sq ft).

=== Armament and armor ===
Lissa was a casemate ship, and she was armed with a main battery of twelve 9-inch (229 mm) breech-loading guns manufactured by Krupp's Essen Works. Ten of these were mounted in a central, armored battery that fired on the broadside only, with the gun ports 1.96 m (6 ft 5 in) above the waterline. The other two guns were placed in a smaller redoubt mounted directly above the main casemate that hung over the lower casemate and allowed for limited end-on fire for some of the guns. These guns could penetrate up to 264 mm (10.4 in) of iron armor. She also carried several smaller guns, including four 8-pounder muzzle-loading, rifled (MLR) guns and two 3-pounder MLR guns. The ship's armored belt was composed of wrought iron plate that was 152 mm (6 in) thick, backed with 770 mm (30.3 in) of wood. The belt extended for 1.74 m (5 ft 9 in) below the waterline. The main battery casemate had 127 mm (5 in) of iron plating, backed with 724 mm (28.5 in) of wood. Transverse bulkheads on either end of the casemate were 114 mm (4.5 in) thick.

== Service history ==
Lissa was laid down on 27 June 1867 at the Stabilimento Tecnico Triestino (STT) shipyard in San Marco. She was launched on 25 February 1869 and began fitting-out work. The following month, Kaiser Franz Joseph I visited the shipyard where Lissa was being built. Completion of the ship was delayed due to limited budgets for the Navy and the significant expense of importing the vessel's armor plate from Britain, and Lissa was not completed until May 1871. Not only did objections to naval expenditures from the Hungarian half of the Dual Monarchy delay construction of Lissa, but they also constrained the general naval budget, which prevented the fleet from being active in peacetime. The death of the fleet commander, Wilhelm von Tegetthoff, in 1871 exacerbated the budgetary problems, as his replacement, Friedrich von Pöck, lacked the prestige to convince the government to increase funding. The ironclad fleet, including Lissa, was largely kept out of service in Pola, laid up in reserve; the only vessels to see significant service in the 1870s were several steam frigates sent abroad.

Nevertheless, Lissa was assigned to the active squadron in November 1871, relieving the ironclad Habsburg as the flagship of the unit, commanded by Konteradmiral (Rear Admiral) Alois von Pokorny. Lissa and the rest of the unit, which also included the screw corvettes Zrinyi and Dandolo and the gunboat Hum, spent the remainder of the year carrying out tactical training in the Adriatic Sea. Lissa remained the flagship of the active squadron in 1872, which was strengthened by the addition of the screw frigate Novara. On 15 January 1872, the entire squadron sailed from Pola to the Dalmatian islands for tactical training exercises. The squadron, less Zrinyi, was sent to the Levant in the eastern Mediterranean, then part of the Ottoman Empire, at the end of February. Lissa arrived in Smyrna in the Ottoman Empire on 1 March, where she was eventually joined by Novara. By 26 March, Zrinyi had rejoined the squadron, and Lissa led Zrinyi and Hum on patrols in the Greek and Ottoman islands in the eastern Mediterranean. The active squadron had left the area by mid-July to carry out tactical training off the island of Corfu, Greece, beginning on 16 July. The ships then sailed to visit Messina on Sicily from 21 to 29 July, followed by a visit at Palermo, Italy on 3 August. Lissa and the rest of the squadron remained there through 12 August for repairs to Lissa's engines. The ships got underway again that day, bound for Goletta in Tunisia. There, the crews held celebrations for Kaiser Franz Joseph's birthday.

Lissa and the rest of the squadron left Tunisia on 23 August and sailed back to Corfu, arriving there on 28 August. From there, Lissa and Novara sailed on to Smyrna, where they assisted the capsized Italian brigantine Providenza. During this period, Lissa had a serious accident on the night of 3–4 September 1872. While anchored off Corfu, a major fire broke out aboard the ship near the propellant magazine, though the crew was able to put it out before it could reach the highly explosive propellant charges. The crew fought the blaze for around two hours, but the ship was not seriously damaged in the incident. The ships of the squadron reunited on 10 September for a cruise in the eastern Mediterranean. On 19 September, the ships stopped in Larnaca on Cyprus; they had moved to Agria by 27 September, and then back to Smyrna two days later. In early October, Lissa received orders to bring the squadron back to Pola. By early December, they had arrived in the Fasana Channel, where the ships were placed in reserve.

Lissa served as the flagship of the active squadron of the Austro-Hungarian fleet in 1873; that year, it also included the screw corvettes Zrinyi and Fasana and the gunboat Velebich. In early September, Lissa was at Smyrna in the Ottoman Empire, while Zrinyi was in Greek waters and Fasana was en route to join Velebich off Spain. On 24 September, she sailed for Port Said in Ottoman Egypt, where she replenished her coal stocks and conducted shooting practice. She thereafter returned to Smyrna, where she remained until 3 November. She then cruised off the coast of Ottoman Syria before sailing for Souda Bay, Crete, to coal. There, she met a small Ottoman squadron, consisting of an ironclad turret ship, two screw corvettes, and a paddle steamer From there, she went to Piraeus, Greece, where on 18 November she was visited by the King and Queen of Greece. The ship then returned to Syria, before ultimately returning to Smyrna on 21 November. Lissa departed Smyrna two days later, bound for Malta, where she marked the 25th anniversary of the reign of Franz Joseph in company with the Russian ironclad Kniaz Pozharsky. Lissa thereafter sailed north to Corfu, Greece, and then home to Pola, arriving there on 11 December. After taking on practice artillery rounds, she sailed on to Trieste the following day. The ship carried out shooting practice there on 15 December and then returned to Pola five days later. There, she was removed from the active squadron and disarmed.

In 1875, the ship received new boilers, and the following year her rigging was modified. By 1880, the ship's hull was badly rotten, and so Lissa was taken into drydock at the Pola Arsenal, where the shipyard workers stripped off much of the vessel's armor plate to replace the deteriorated timber with new wood. The work was completed the following year, allowing the ship to return to service. While in drydock, the ship's armament was also revised; the original twelve 9-inch guns were retained, but the light battery was completely revised. The old MLRs were replaced with four 9 cm (3.5 in) 24-caliber guns and a pair of 7 cm (2.8 in) 15-cal. guns, and three 47 mm (1.9 in) Hotchkiss guns and a pair of 25 mm (0.98 in) auto-cannon were added.

After completing the overhaul, she returned to her place in the active squadron. Lissa took part in the fleet exercises held in June 1885, where she served as the flagship of the ironclad squadron. The maneuvers revolved around a mock attack by torpedo boats on the ironclad squadron off the island of Lissa. She remained on active service until 1888, when she was reassigned to the II Reserve. She received further modifications during this period, with torpedo launchers added in 1885 and new quick-firing versions of her main battery guns were installed. She was visited by Rudolf, Crown Prince of Austria on 27 March 1885. The ship remained in the Austro-Hungarian inventory, seeing little activity before she was stricken from the naval register on 13 November 1892. Lissa was broken up for scrap between 1893 and 1895.
