= SMS Frundsberg =

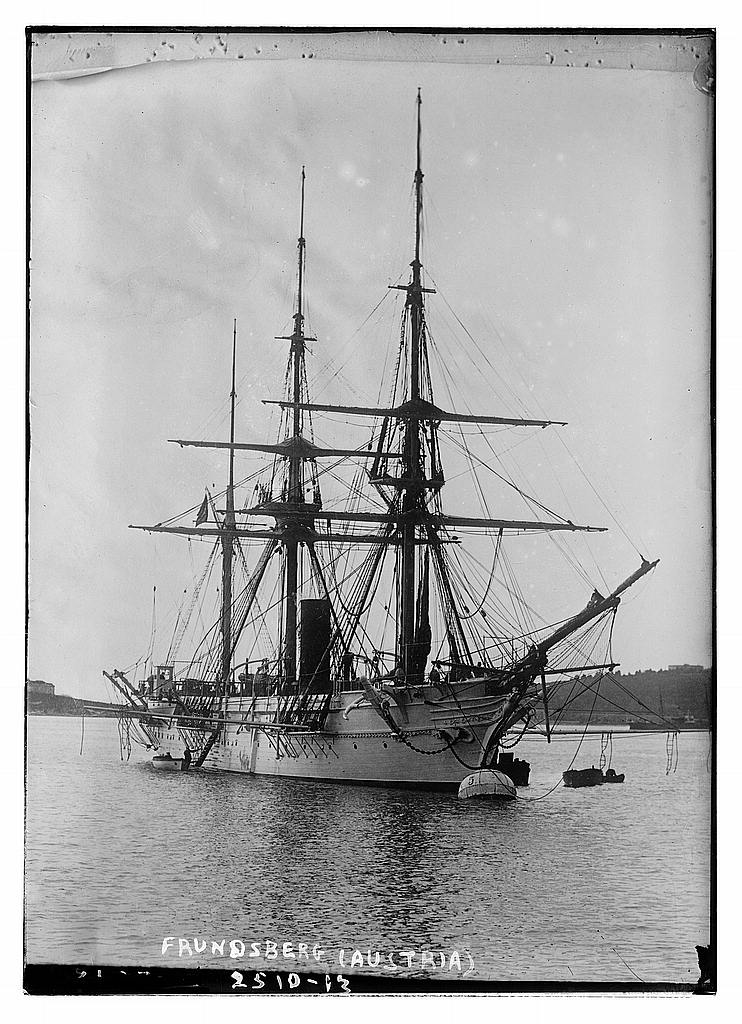
- Frundsberg circa 1905

History

Austro-Hungarian Empire
- Name: Frundsberg
- Builder: Stabilimento Tecnico Triestino, Trieste
- Laid down: 19 June 1871
- Launched: 11 February 1873
- Completed: October 1873
- Reclassified: Hulked, 1905
- Fate: Ceded to Yugoslavia, 1920

General characteristics
- Class & type: Aurora-class corvette
- Displacement: 1,353 long tons (1,375 t)
- Length: 69.08 m (226 ft 8 in)
- Beam: 10.45 m (34 ft 3 in)
- Draft: 5 m (16 ft 5 in)
- Installed power: 1,000 ihp (750 kW)
- Propulsion: 1 × triple-expansion steam engine; 1 × screw propeller
- Sail plan: Barque
- Speed: 11 knots (20 km/h; 13 mph)
- Complement: 210
- Armament: 4 × 15 cm (5.9 in) Wahrendorf Breech-loading guns; 2 × 7 cm (2.8 in) guns; 2 × 25 mm (1 in) machine guns

SMS Frundsberg was an Austro-Hungarian corvette built by Stabilimento Tecnico Triestino.

== Design ==
Frundsberg was an Aurora-class corvette, sometimes referred to as sloops, of the Austro-Hungarian Navy. She was 69.08 m (226 ft 8 in) long overall and 59.1 m (193 ft 11 in) long between perpendiculars. She had a beam of 10.45 m (34 ft 3 in) and a draft of 5 m (16 ft 5 in). The ship had a displacement of 1,353 long tons (1,375 t). Her crew numbered 210 officers and enlisted sailors.

The ship was powered by a single triple-expansion steam engine that drove a screw propeller. The number and type of boilers is not known, but smoke from the boilers was vented through a single funnel located amidships, between the fore- and main mast. The propulsion system was capable of generating 1,000 indicated horsepower (750 kW), for a top speed of 11 knots (20 km/h; 13 mph). The ship was fitted with a three-masted sailing rig to supplement the steam engine on long voyages.

Frundsberg was armed with a main battery of four 15 cm (5.9 in) Wahrendorf breechloading guns. She also carried a pair of 7 cm (2.8 in) guns and two 25 mm (0.98 in) machine guns. By 1891, the ship's armament had been revised significantly. Two of the 15 cm guns, one of the 7 cm guns, and both of the 25 mm machine guns were removed, and a new light battery of four 9 cm (3.5 in) guns and two 47 mm (1.9 in) Hotchkiss revolving cannon were installed.

== Service history ==
The keel for Frundsberg was laid down at the Stabilimento Tecnico Triestino shipyard on 19 June 1871. She was launched on 11 February 1873, and was completed in October that year.

On 5 January 1874, Frundsberg was assigned to the active squadron of the Austro-Hungarian fleet. At that time, the unit also included the ironclad Kaiser, the screw frigate Radetzky, the screw corvette Fasana, and the gunboat Velebich. Most of the ships were stationed in Pola in February, though Fasana and Velebich were in Spanish waters at the time, as a result of the Cantonal Revolution against the Spanish government. Frundsberg, Kaiser, and the gunboat Dalmat were all sent to join them there in the coming weeks. Frundsberg sailed on 4 February, bound for Barcelona, Spain, where she awaited the arrival of Kaiser, the squadron flagship, which reached the port on 4 March. The two ships carried out shooting practice on 28 and 29 March, and on 7 April, the two ships departed together to conduct two days of tactical maneuvers in company with Fasana. The Austro-Hungarian ships patrolled the southern Spanish coast over the summer, and visited a number of Spanish ports, including Cádiz, Cartagena, Tarragona, and Valencia, along with Gibraltar and Tangier in Morocco.

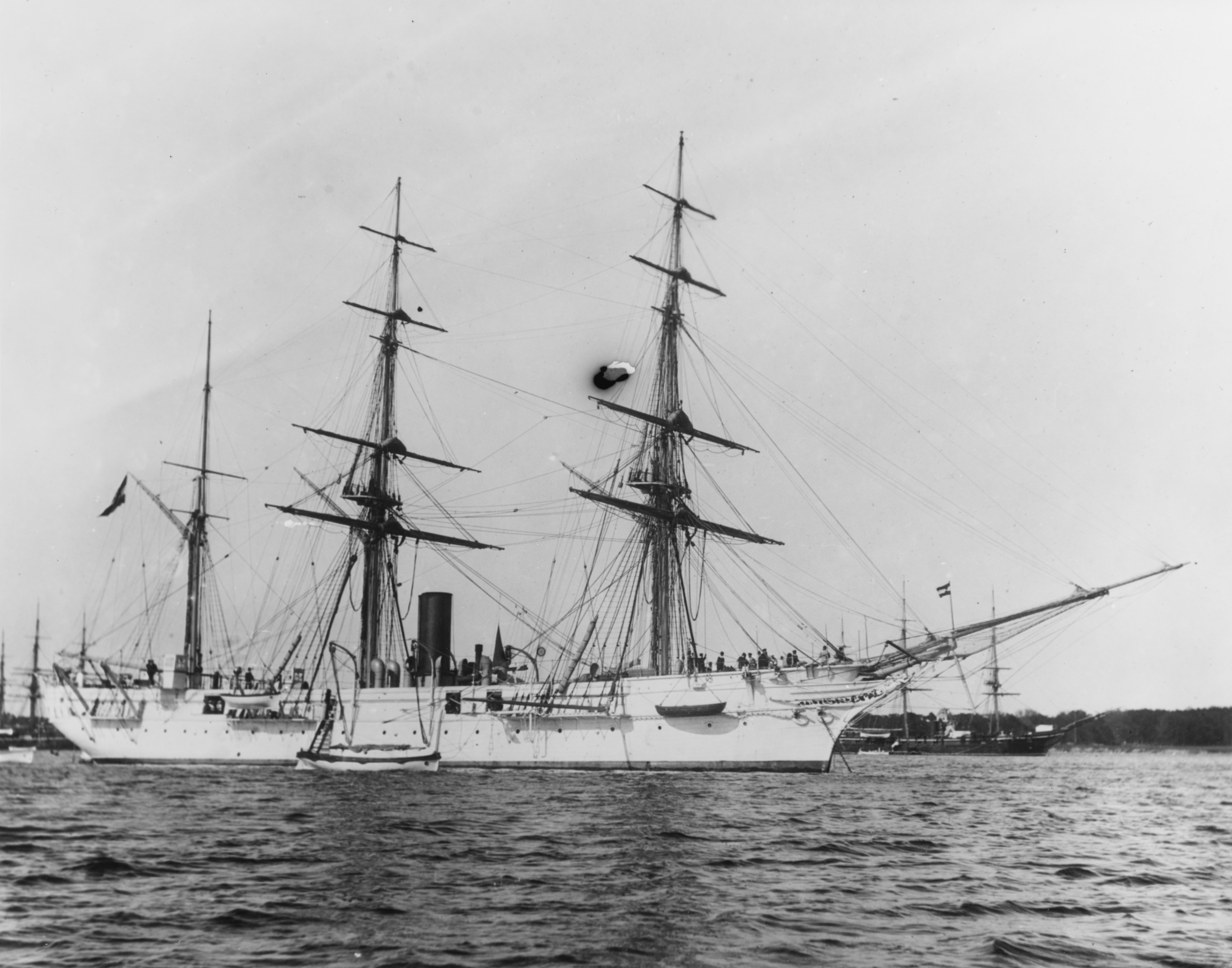
An unidentified member of the Aurora class, date unknown

While in Valencia in early May, Frundsberg was delayed departing by a Spanish mob that attacked the Austro-Hungarian consulate there on the 4th. She remained there until 9 May, when she left to return to Barcelona. She remained there for the next two months, eventually sailing again on 11 July to return to Valencia. Upon returning to Barcelona on 18 July, Frundsberg received orders to return home, and she departed three days later in company with Kaiser. While underway, she received orders from Kaiser to maneuver independently, so Frundsberg detached from Kaiser, using her sails only, and passed south of Sardinia and then through the Strait of Messina to stop in Messina. From there, she proceeded to Gravosa, ultimately arriving in Pola on 19 August. In early September, she moved to the Fasana Channel, where she rejoined Kaiser. The deployment to Spain was used, in part, to evaluate the recently completed Frundsberg, and it was found that she maneuvered just as well under sail as under steam, and her top speeds were comparable.

In 1884, Frundsberg embarked on a major voyage overseas. She passed through the Suez Canal and the Red Sea and toured eastern Africa before returning to Pola in 1885. During this voyage, she visited Madagascar and other islands off the coast, including Zanzibar and the Seychelles. On 12 August that year, she departed Pola for another lengthy trip abroad, this time to East Asia. She once again passed through the Suez Canal and the Red Sea, stopping in Suakin in Mahdist Sudan and Massawa in Italian Eritrea on the way, but instead sailed east to British India, stopping in many ports in the country, including Madras, Pondicherry, and Calcutta. She arrived back in Austria-Hungary in 1886.

The ship returned to the east coast of Africa for a cruise in 1892, though this year she sailed around the southern tip of the continent to visit ports in West Africa. Frundsberg made another overseas cruise in 1896 and 1897, which included visits to ports in western and southern Africa, the West Indies, and South America. In 1898, Frundsberg and the screw corvette Saida went on a deployment to East Asia. In July, Frundsberg visited Manila in the Philippines in the aftermath of the Battle of Manila Bay during the Spanish–American War. She was one of many neutral warships from Germany, Britain, France, and Japan that stopped in the islands to observe the situation and protect their nationals in the city. They were joined there in 1899 by the protected cruiser Kaiserin Elisabeth, though all three ships returned home later that year, having been replaced by the new cruiser Zenta. In 1905 Frundsberg was reduced to a storage hulk. After the outbreak of World War I in July 1914, she was used to store naval mines, based in Šibenik. Following Austria-Hungary's defeat in 1918, she was transferred to the new Royal Yugoslav Navy and renamed Zlarin. Her ultimate fate is not known.
