= SMS Helgoland (1867) =

Class overview
- Operators: Austro-Hungarian Navy
- Preceded by: Erzherzog Friedrich class
- Succeeded by: SMS Fasana

History
- Name: Helgoland
- Builder: Pola Navy Yard, Pola
- Laid down: 17 September 1866
- Launched: 23 December 1867
- Completed: 3 April 1869
- Decommissioned: 1890
- Fate: Scrapped, 1897

General characteristics
- Type: Screw corvette
- Displacement: 1,798 long tons (1,827 t)
- Length: 74.26 m (243 ft 8 in)
- Beam: 11.38 m (37 ft 4 in)
- Draft: 5.3 m (17 ft 5 in)
- Installed power: 1,127 ihp (840 kW)
- Propulsion: 1 × marine steam engine; 1 × screw propeller
- Speed: 10.5 knots (19.4 km/h; 12.1 mph)
- Complement: 235
- Armament: 2 × 7 in (178 mm) Armstrong guns; 4 × 8-pounder guns; 1 × 3-pounder gun

SMS Helgoland was a screw corvette of the Austro-Hungarian Navy built in the late 1860s. She was the only member of her class.

== Design ==
Helgoland was a screw corvette, sometimes referred to as a sloop, of the Austro-Hungarian Navy. She was 74.26 m (243 ft 8 in) long overall, with a beam of 11.38 m (37 ft 4 in) and a draft of 5.3 m (17 ft 5 in). The ship had a displacement of 1,798 long tons (1,827 t). Her wooden hull was given copper sheathing to protect the wood from biofouling and damage from marine parasites like shipworm. Her crew numbered 235 officers and enlisted sailors.

The ship was powered by a single 2-cylinder, horizontal marine steam engine that drove a screw propeller. The number and type of boilers is not known, but smoke from the boilers was vented through a single funnel located amidships, between the fore- and main mast. The propulsion system was capable of generating 1,127 indicated horsepower (840 kW), for a top speed of 10.5 knots (19.4 km/h; 12.1 mph). The ship was fitted with a three-masted sailing rig to supplement the steam engine on long voyages.

Helgoland was armed with a main battery of two 7 in (178 mm) muzzle-loading guns manufactured by Armstrong. She also carried four 8-pounder guns and a single 3-pounder gun.

== Service history ==
=== Construction and operations in the Mediterranean ===
Helgoland was built at the Pola Navy Yard, with her keel laid on 17 September 1866. She was launched on 23 December 1867, and she was completed on 3 April 1869. Upon entering service in 1869, Helgoland was assigned to a squadron sent to patrol the Levant in the eastern Mediterranean under the command of Rear Admiral Friedrich von Pöck. The squadron also included the ironclad warships Erzherzog Ferdinand Max and Salamander, the gunboats Streiter, Reka, and Hum, and the screw schooner Kerka. In August, Helgoland sailed to Alexandria in Ottoman Egypt, where she met the transport ship Bravo. Isma'il Pasha of Egypt had given four ancient Egyptian columns as a gift to Kaiser Franz Joseph, and Bravo was to carry them to Austria-Hungary. Helgoland took Bravo under tow for the first leg of the voyage, departing Alexandria on 27 August. Severe storms during the voyage forced the ships to shelter at Cape Krio and the island of Gavdos; they then passed through Zakynthos before reaching Corfu on 7 September. From there, Bravo sailed on alone, allowing Helgoland to return to the squadron after a stay in Corfu for eight days.

Having taken aboard mail for the other ships, she met the two ironclads in Smyrna later that month. She and Erzherzog Ferdinand Max departed on 28 September to visit Mytilene, arriving on 2 October. From there, the ships sailed on to Urla before returning to Smyrna. On 21 October, Pöck came aboard Helgoland, along with four pilots that Hum had brought to Smyrna; Helgoland departed that day for Varna to meet Franz Joseph's yacht Greif. Helgoland joined Greif and the steamers Kaiserin Elisabeth and Gargnano to on a voyage to Constantinople, the capital of the Ottoman Empire; they were escorted from Varna by the Ottoman imperial yacht, Sultaniye. There, they were to meet Franz Joseph, who would then board Greif to tour the eastern Mediterranean. Helgoland remained outside the Dardanelles, and in early November, Pöck, who had since returned to Erzherzog Ferdinand Max, ordered Helgoland and Hum to sail on to Beirut in Ottoman Syria. Over the following days, Franz Joseph visited a number of cities in Egypt and Syria, including Port Said, Jaffa, and Jerusalem. After Greif, Gargnano, and Kaiserin Elisabeth arrived in Beirut, heavy seas prevented the latter vessels from leaving, so Helgoland escorted Greif back south to Port Said on 15 November. Following the opening ceremonies for the Suez Canal, Helgoland escorted the Kaiser's entourage back across the Mediterranean, leaving Alexandria on 25 November and stopping in Corfu to take on coal. The ships arrived in Trieste on 3 December. Helgoland then left for Pola on 6 December for repairs after her cruise.

Helgoland remained under repair at Pola well into 1870, and after work was completed later that year, she made a trial voyage from Pola to Kumbor. After completing the test, she joined the ironclad Habsburg, Hum, and Kerka at Gravosa on 20 May. The ships soon dispersed, and Helgoland followed Habsburg to Fasana, where they conducted shooting practice. Helgoland thereafter returned to Pola, but she got underway again on 18 June, bound for Port Said, which she reached on 16 July. After a six-day stay, she sailed north for the coast of Syria, including a stop in Beirut. The ship then returned to Port Said on 4 August. In early September, Helgoland left Port Said and returned to Corfu on 9 September, where she joined the rest of the active squadron. By that time, the squadron had been altered slightly, and now consisted of Habsburg, the screw corvette Dandolo, Hum, Reka, and Kerka. Helgoland continued on to Pola, arriving on 27 September. After remaining there for nearly a month, she was assigned to serve as the station ship in Marseille, France, departing on 20 October. On the way, she passed through numerous ports, including Lussin, Austria-Hungary; Messina, Sicily; and Cagliari, Sardinia. The latter stop had not been intended, but while sailing from Messina to Marseille, Helgoland encountered a severe storm that destroyed her jibboom and damaged her rudder. Her crew made repairs to the ship while in Cagliari, allowing her to continued on to Marseille, eventually arriving on 16 November. Helgoland remained in Marseille until 1 April, when she began a lengthy tour of the Mediterranean. First she sailed west to Barcelona, Spain, before turning south to Mahón on the island of Menorca. From there, she sailed east, stopping in Naples and Palermo, Italy, before continuing on to Smyrna. There, the Austro-Hungarian squadron commander inspected the ship, and he found her to be in need of repairs. Helgoland departed for Pola maintenance, arriving there on 2 June and being decommissioned three days later.

=== 1872–1873 training cruise ===
Helgoland was dry-docked in Pola on 7 March 1872, to begin a series of extensive repairs. First, her copper bottom was cleaned and her screw was replaced, and then she was returned to the water. On 30 March, she was dry-docked again for further work, which included repairs to her masts, some of which needed to be replaced; repairs and re-caulking of her hull; general repairs to her interior spaces and guns; and the installation of a new deck house on her stern. By that time, sharply reduced naval budgets had curtailed most activities for the Austro-Hungarian Navy, apart from occasional training cruises for the fleet's cruising vessels, which had begun in 1869 at the Kaiser's direction. Helgoland was reactivated for one such voyage later on 22 October 1872. Before departing, the crew took the ship on a short trial voyage and made other preparations for the lengthy cruise. Bad weather further delayed the ship's departure by several days.

On 3 November, Helgoland got underway and cruised westward across the Mediterranean, largely under sail alone. Contrary winds and bad weather slowed her progress, and she reached Cartagena, Spain, only on 8 December. The ship stopped there to disembark a seriously ill sailor, and thereafter continued westward on 10 December. Severe storms on 14 December forced her again to take shelter, this time at the anchorage at Roquetas de Mar, along with fifty other ships that had been in the area. The weather calmed the following morning, allowing Helgoland to proceed to Gibraltar; she arrived there in the early hours of 16 December. While the ship was there, her crew replenished food and other supplies, and were permitted to tour the British fortifications of the colony. She got underway again on 22 December, and by 4 February 1873, she had reached the coast of Bahia, Brazil. She stopped in Salvador, where several vessels of the Brazilian Navy greeted the ship. The crew made repairs to Helgoland and replenished supplies before departing on 12 February, sailing north for Barbados. After nearly a month's sailing, she arrived there on 11 March.

Helgoland stayed in Barbados until 17 March, when she sailed for her next stop at Kingston, Jamaica. She arrived there on 23 March, and further repairs were carried out. On 31 March, the ship moved to Port Royal, Jamaica to replenish the crew's drinking water. She departed later that day, bound for Havana, Cuba. Helgoland arrived there and was greeted by the Spanish Rear Admiral Don Manuel de la Rigada; his flagship, the screw frigate Gerona, exchanged salutes with Helgoland. The ship then got underway again on 26 April, continuing in her northward journey and arriving off the East coast of the United States by early May. She reached her destination, New York City, on 8 May, and the Austro-Hungarians were greeted by Vice Admiral Stephen Clegg Rowan aboard his flagship, USS Frolic; Rowan was the commander of the New York Navy Yard, and he invited the officers of Helgoland to tour the shipyard. While she was in New York, the Austro-Hungarian ambassador to the United States, Karl von Lederer, visited the ship. Helgoland left New York on 3 June and stopped next in Newport, Rhode Island two days later.

The ship left Newport on 21 June and began her voyage back across the Atlantic. After a month of cruising, Helgoland approached the coast of Portugal, and she rounded Cape St. Vincent on 21 July. She arrived at Gibraltar two days later to replenish fuel and supplies. The crew also made repairs to the rigging and repainted the hull after their long voyage. While the ship was still there on 28 July, the captain received orders to sail for Cádiz, as revolutionary unrest threatened Austro-Hungarians and other foreign nationals in the city. Helgoland was joined there by the gunboat Velebich, the British ironclad HMS Triumph, the American corvette USS Shenandoah, the German corvette SMS Elisabeth, among other vessels. By 4 August, the situation had calmed in the city, allowing Helgoland to depart. She arrived back in Gibraltar the following day, but stayed there for only a few hours before getting underway again to return home. She finally reached Pola on 29 August, where she was decommissioned on 3 September.

=== 1873–1874 training cruise ===
Helgoland was recommissioned on 3 November 1873 for another overseas training cruise. She embarked on the voyage on 11 November, and after stops in Fasana and Lissa, reached Port Said on 23 November. After passing through the Suez Canal, she sailed from Suez on 3 December and stopped in Aden on 16 December, where repairs to her boilers were carried out. This work lasted until 25 December, when she departed, sailing south to visit Zanzibar. The ship arrived there on the morning of 13 January 1874, and upon arrival she exchanged salutes with the coastal fort outside the harbor. Helgoland stayed in the port for several days, and on 15 January, the commander and his staff were invited to meet Sultan Barghash bin Said. Two days later, the ship received word that the French barque Benecia had run aground on a coral reef outside the port. Helgoland sent a launch with thirty-five men, who were able to re-float the barque. Helgoland left Zanzibar on 31 January and crossed over to Bagamoyo on the mainland, anchoring off the mouth of the Kingani River for three days. The ship made a brief return to Zanzibar before continuing on further south.

By 10 February, the ship had reached the Comoro Islands, and four days later, the crew spotted the coast of Madagascar. Later that day, Helgoland anchored off Nosy Be, staying there until 22 February. She continued along the coast, stopping in Sulara, Mahajanga, and Tullear in late February and mid-March. Helgoland left Tullear on 26 March, bound for Mauritius, arriving there on 16 May. She remained there for more than a month, making repairs to her boilers and water distiller, and her foremast was replaced, as it was found to have begun rotting. Helgoland departed on 17 June, but had to return on the 22nd when it became apparent that the distiller was not working reliably to permit the ship to reach the British colony of Natal. One of the ship's coal bunkers was converted to hold water, which would permit the ship to sail for seventy days. She left again on 18 July, and on 18 August, the ship arrived in Simon's Town, Cape Colony. From there, Helgoland continued north into the Atlantic Ocean. While sailing off the Azores on 17 November, the ship was struck by a severe cyclone, which damaged her rudder, leaving her unable to steer. The ship reached São Miguel Island, Azores, where she stayed for some four months to have her rudder repaired. She was finally able to resume her voyage on 14 March 1875; after stops in Tangiers and Gibraltar, she reached Pola on 7 May. Over the course of the voyage, the ship had sailed 24,699 nautical miles (45,743 km; 28,423 mi).

=== Later career ===
The ship next went abroad in 1879 for a cruise to Australia, where she represented Austria-Hungary at the Sydney International Exhibition, which lasted until 1880. Helgoland thereafter returned to Pola. Helgoland embarked on another overseas cruise in 1886, once again visiting ports in western and southern Africa. Helgoland was decommissioned in 1890, and was broken up for scrap in 1897.
