= SMS Zrinyi (1870) =

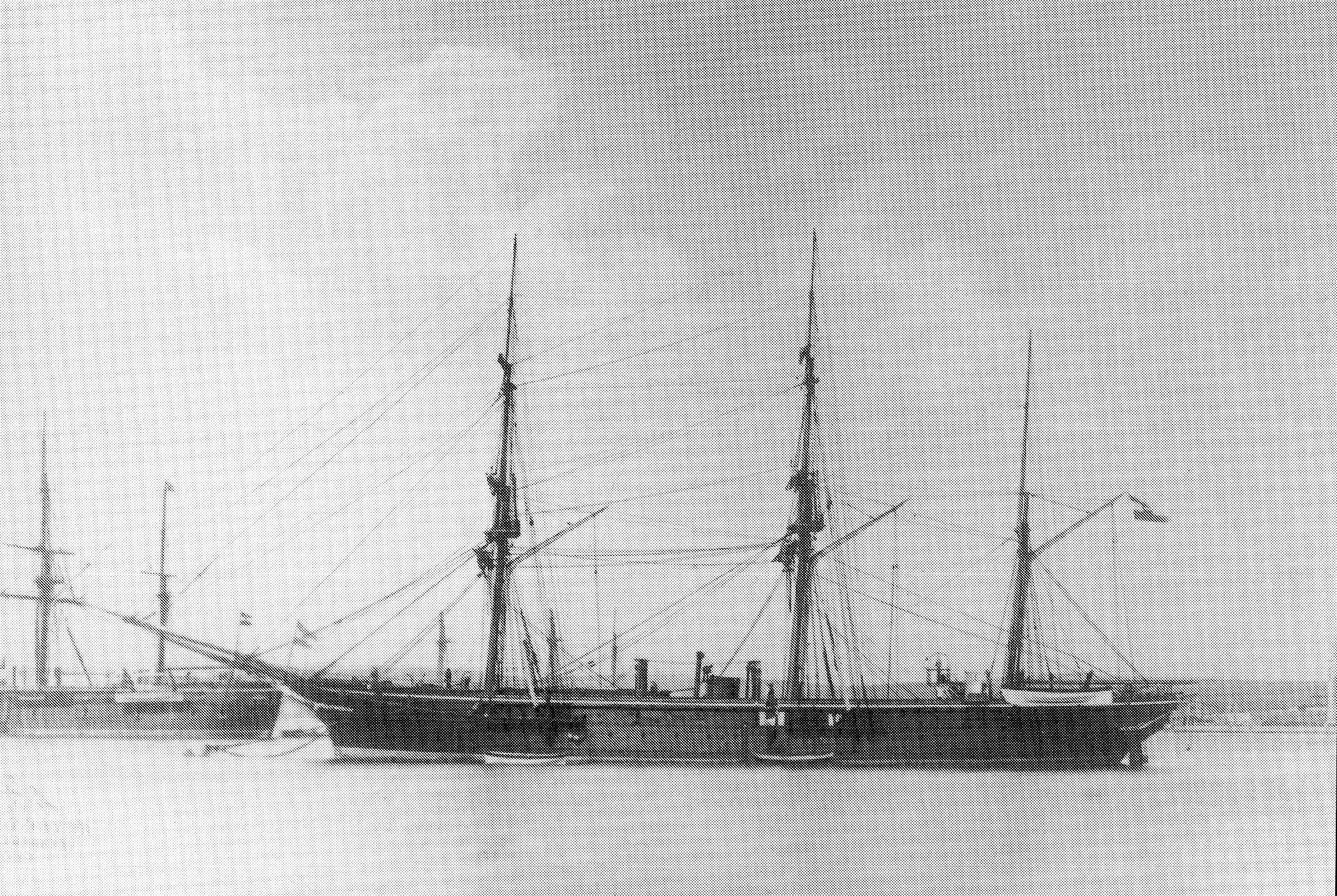
- Zrinyi in port

History

Austro-Hungarian Empire
- Name: Zrinyi
- Builder: Stabilimento Tecnico Triestino, Trieste
- Laid down: 17 January 1870
- Launched: 10 December 1870
- Completed: 26 August 1871
- Renamed: Delta, 1908

General characteristics
- Class & type: Aurora-class corvette
- Displacement: 1,353 long tons (1,375 t)
- Length: 69.08 m (226 ft 8 in)
- Beam: 10.45 m (34 ft 3 in)
- Draft: 5 m (16 ft 5 in)
- Installed power: 1,000 ihp (750 kW)
- Propulsion: 1 × triple-expansion steam engine; 1 × screw propeller
- Sail plan: Barque
- Speed: 11 knots (20 km/h; 13 mph)
- Complement: 210
- Armament: 4 × 15 cm (5.9 in) Wahrendorf Breech-loading guns; 2 × 7 cm (2.8 in) guns; 2 × 25 mm (1 in) machine guns

SMS Zrinyi was a screw corvette of the Aurora class and was built for the Austro-Hungarian Navy in the early 1870s.

== Design ==
Zrinyi was an Aurora-class corvette, sometimes referred to as sloops, of the Austro-Hungarian Navy. She was 69.08 m (226 ft 8 in) long overall and 59.1 m (193 ft 11 in) long between perpendiculars. She had a beam of 10.45 m (34 ft 3 in) and a draft of 5 m (16 ft 5 in). The ship had a displacement of 1,353 long tons (1,375 t). Her crew numbered 210 officers and enlisted sailors.

The ship was powered by a single triple-expansion steam engine that drove a screw propeller. The number and type of boilers is not known, but smoke from the boilers was vented through a single funnel located amidships, between the fore- and main mast. The propulsion system was capable of generating 1,000 indicated horsepower (750 kW), for a top speed of 11 knots (20 km/h; 13 mph). The ship was fitted with a three-masted sailing rig to supplement the steam engine on long voyages.

Zrinyi was armed with a main battery of four 15 cm (5.9 in) Wahrendorf breechloading guns. She also carried a pair of 7 cm (2.8 in) guns and two 25 mm (0.98 in) machine guns. By 1891, the ship's armament had been revised significantly. Two of the 15 cm guns, one of the 7 cm guns, and both of the 25 mm machine guns were removed, and a new light battery of four 9 cm (3.5 in) guns and two 47 mm (1.9 in) Hotchkiss revolving cannon were installed.

== Service history ==
=== Construction and early career ===
Zrinyi was built at the Stabilimento Tecnico Triestino in Trieste; her keel was laid down on 17 January 1870, and she was launched less than a year later on 10 December. The first member of the class to enter service, Zrinyi was completed on 26 August 1871. After entering service, Zrinyi was assigned to the active squadron of the fleet on 1 September, which also included the ironclad Habsburg and the gunboats Velebich and Hum. Zrinyi did not arrive with the unit until 3 October, and the following month, the squadron was further strengthened by the corvette Dandolo.

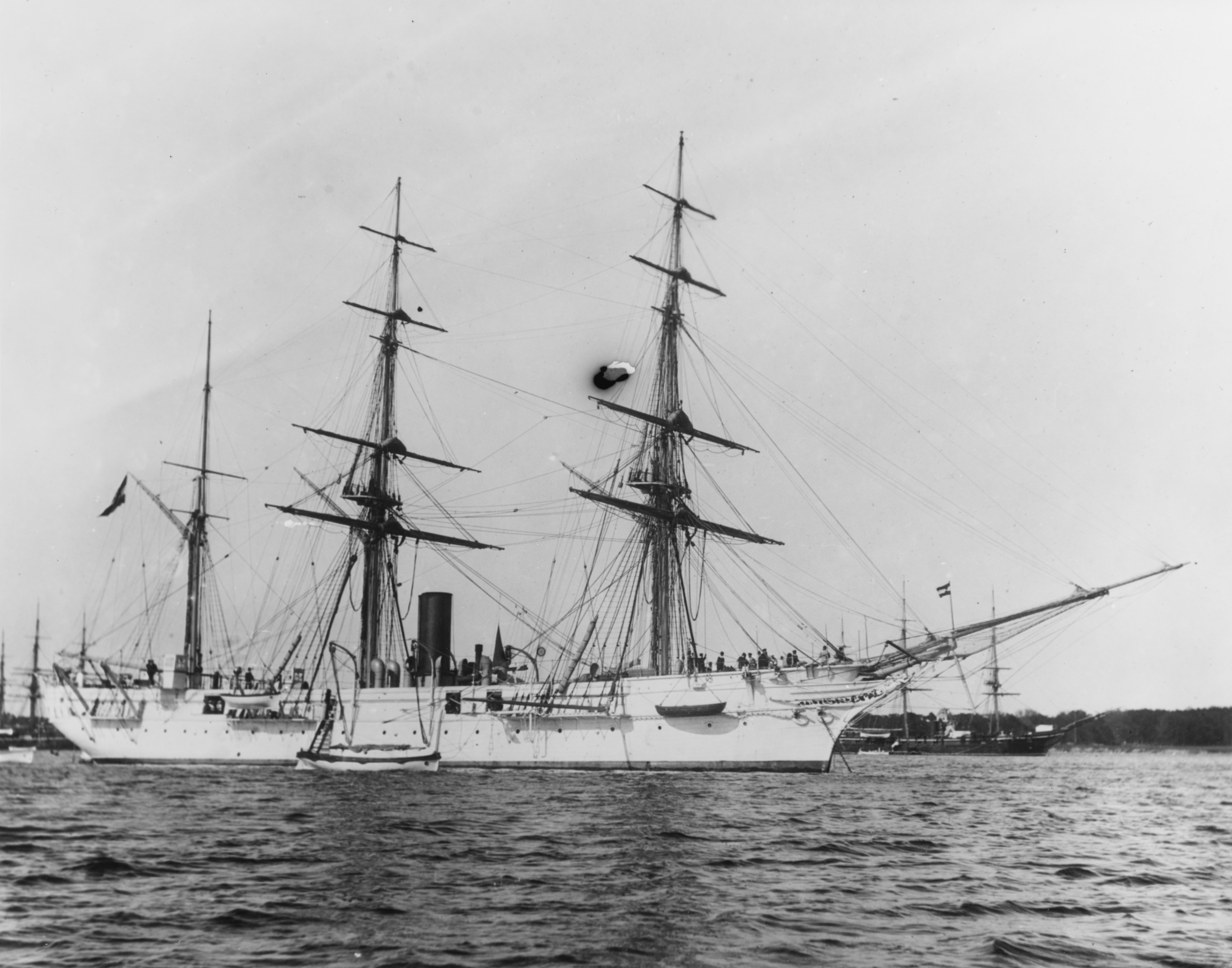
An unidentified member of the Aurora class, date unknown

In mid-January 1872, the active squadron was reorganized. The old screw frigate Novara joined the unit on 13 January and the ironclad Lissa relieved Habsburg. On 15 January, the united squadron, consisting of Lissa—the flagship—Zrinyi, Novara, Dandolo, and Hum, sailed from Pola to the Dalmatian islands for tactical training exercises. The squadron soon began to disperse, and on 9 February Zrinyi was detached to return to Pola, where modifications were made to make her suitable to host Archduke Johann on a visit to Piraeus, Greece. She later sailed and arrived there on 14 March. She completed her mission there by 26 March, when she rejoined the active squadron, which had been sent to the eastern Mediterranean. She thereafter cruised with Lissa and Hum on patrols in the Greek and Ottoman islands in the region. Zrinyi spent the month of May in Alexandria in Ottoman Egypt.

The active squadron had left the area by mid-July to carry out tactical training off the island of Corfu, Greece, beginning on 16 July. The ships then sailed to visit Messina on Sicily from 21 to 29 July, followed by a visit at Palermo, Italy on 3 August. Zrinyi and the rest of the squadron remained there through 12 August for repairs to Lissa's engines. The ships got underway again that day, bound for Goletta in Tunisia. There, the crews held celebrations for Kaiser Franz Joseph's birthday. Zrinyi and the rest of the squadron left Tunisia on 23 August and sailed back to Corfu, arriving there on 28 August. The ships went on a cruise in the eastern Mediterranean on 10 September. On 19 September, the ships stopped in Larnaca on Cyprus; they had moved to Agria by 27 September, and then back to Smyrna two days later. In early October, the ships received orders to return to Pola. By early December, they had arrived in the Fasana Channel, where the ships were placed in reserve.

At the end of 1872, Zrinyi and Dandolo were ordered to return to the eastern Mediterranean. Zrinyi was sent to patrol the coast of Syria and Egypt; she left Trieste on 2 January 1873 and passed through Lissa before reaching in Smyrna on 21 January. While there, Zrinyi received instructions to sail back to Italy, where the Austro-Hungaria barque Ortodossia had run aground in Foggia in bad weather. The merchant vessel had been broken in half by heavy seas and could not be saved, but Zrinyi assisted in the recovery of its cargo of marble and iron over the course of two days. Zrinyi returned to Smyrna on 26 January. She departed again on 3 February to cruise down the coast of Syria to Alexandria, but heavy storms on 6 February forced her to seek shelter at Vathy on the island of Samos. The island had recently been hit by an earthquake that had badly damaged the buildings there; while she was there, her crew assisted with relief work. The ship departed again on 10 February, stopping in Amorgos on the way and arriving in Alexandria ten days later. She remained there until 8 March and then sailed back north to Smyrna, passing through Fethiye, kos, Bodrum, and Vathi on the way.

Zrinyi remained in Smyrna for the next month, departing on 21 April for the Dardanelles, where she embarked Alexander Conze and members of his archaeological expedition to take them to the island of Samothrace. She carried the team on 25 April and remained off the island through mid-June while they carried out the excavations there. The archaeologists loaded their discoveries aboard Zrinyi on 12 June, which departed for home, passing through Piraeus, Lissa, and Spalato on the way before reaching Muggia on 6 July, where the archaeologists disembarked. In mid-August, Zrinyi received orders to join Lissa, still the flagship of the active squadron, for a cruise in the eastern Mediterranean. She left Trieste on 23 August and rendezvoused with Lissa the following day; the two ships then sailed to Pola to replenish fuel and supplies for the voyage. They were underway again by 31 August, bound for the coast of Syria. Zrinyi initially sailed independently, passing along the Greek coast and stopping in Piraeus on 16 September. She remained there for four days and carried out shooting practice while there. On 28 September, she got underway again and reached the Syrian coast on 4 October. While cruising there, she made a visit to Suda Bay from 8 to 16 October and then Poros, Greece, from 21 to 25 October. She returned to Syria on 29 October and later stopped in Milos from 17 to 20 November. From there, she sailed to Navarino and encountered heavy seas on the night of 23–24 November. Zrinyi anchored in Navarino later on the 24th. Two days later, she departed, bound for home. On the way, she stopped in Zakynthos, Argostoli, Corfu, and Lissa before arriving back in Pola on 20 December. She was laid up there four days later.

=== Later career ===
Zrinyi went on a lengthy cruise in the West Indies in 1885, returning to Pola the following year. From 1890 to 1891, the ship embarked on a cruise to East Asia. The ship made another visit to South American waters during a long cruise in 1893 and 1894. The voyage also saw visits to ports in western and southern Africa. Austria-Hungary's growing trade with South America was a significant reason for the trip, and while she was in Rio de Janeiro, Brazil, she encountered a trio of Austro-Hungarian merchant vessels that were stranded there because of riots in the city that prevented them from being loaded. Zrinyi sent a landing party ashore to help load the vessels and guard them until they could sail for home. After returning to Austria-Hungary in 1894, Zrinyi made another trip to South America and West Africa in 1897–1898.

In 1905, Zrinyi was hulked, and three years later, she was renamed Delta to free her name for the new pre-dreadnought battleship Zrinyi. Delta was later used as a naval mine storage hulk in Pola during World War I. Her fate following Austria-Hungary's defeat in 1918 is unknown.
