= SMS Dandolo =

- Dandolo

History
- Name: Dandolo
- Namesake: Enrico Dandolo
- Builder: Venetian Arsenal, Venice
- Laid down: 26 September 1854
- Launched: 7 August 1858
- Completed: February 1859
- Decommissioned: 1879
- Fate: Scrapped, 1900–1901

General characteristics
- Class & type: Erzherzog Friedrich-class corvette
- Displacement: 1,697 long tons (1,724 t)
- Length: 67.8 m (222 ft 5 in)
- Beam: 12.16 m (39 ft 11 in)
- Draft: 5.08 m (16 ft 8 in)
- Installed power: 920 ihp (690 kW)
- Propulsion: 1 × marine steam engine; 1 × screw propeller
- Speed: 8 to 9 knots (15 to 17 km/h; 9.2 to 10.4 mph)
- Complement: 294
- Armament: 17 × 30-pounder guns; 4 × 60-pounder Paixhans guns; 1 × 48-pounder gun

SMS Dandolo was the second and final member of the Erzherzog Friedrich class of screw corvettes built for the Austrian Navy in the 1850s.

== Design ==
Dandolo was 67.8 m (222 ft 5 in) long overall, with a beam of 12.16 m (39 ft 11 in) and a draft of 5.08 m (16 ft 8 in). The ship had a displacement of 1,697 long tons (1,724 t). Her crew numbered 294 officers and enlisted sailors.

The ship was powered by a single 2-cylinder, horizontal marine steam engine that drove a screw propeller. The number and type of boilers is not known, but smoke from the boilers was vented through a single funnel located amidships, between the fore- and main mast. The propulsion system was capable of generating 920 indicated horsepower (690 kW), for a top speed of 8 to 9 knots (15 to 17 km/h; 9.2 to 10.4 mph). The ship was fitted with a three-masted sailing rig to supplement the steam engine on long voyages.

Dandolo was armed with a main battery of seventeen 30-pounder muzzleloading guns, which were supplemented with four shell-firing, 60-pounder Paixhans guns and a single 48-pounder gun. By 1866, one of the 30-pounder guns and the 48-pounder had been removed and a pair of 24-pounder rifled guns were installed. By 1871, the ship's armament had been standardized on fourteen of the 24-pounder guns, with one 3-pounder gun. A final refit by 1877 saw the ship exchange her old muzzleloaders for a battery of twelve 15 cm (5.9 in) breechloading guns, supported by two 7 cm (2.8 in) guns.

== Service history ==
=== Construction and early career ===
The keel for Dandolo was laid down at the Venetian Arsenal on 29 September 1854. She was launched on 7 August 1858, and was completed in February 1859. At the same time, tensions between Austria and the Kingdom of Sardinia rose significantly, prompting the Austrian government to order the fleet to mobilize in February to be prepared for an attack by the Royal Sardinian Navy. Sardinia had signed a secret alliance with France the month before, and in April, the Second Italian War of Independence began. Though the sizes of the Austrian and Sardinian fleets were roughly equal, the French Navy was far superior, which forced the Austrians to take a defensive posture. Dandolo and the other, modern steam-powered warships concentrated at Pola in the northern Adriatic. They did not sortie to attach the French or Sardinian naval forces, and the war ended quickly after the defeats at Magenta and Solferino in June.

Already in late 1862, the head of the Austrian Navy, Archduke Ferdinand Max, offered the sale Dandolo and several other wooden ships in an attempt to acquire funds to build a fleet of ironclad warships, though the proposal came to nothing. Ferdinand Max left Austria in 1864 to become the Emperor of Mexico; his brother, Kaiser Franz Joseph of Austria, ordered that a ship be stationed in Mexican waters until his reign was solidified (so that he could be quickly evacuated in the event the Second Mexican Empire collapsed). Dandolo was sent in early 1865 to relieve the screw frigate Novara. She departed Trieste on 4 January and arrived in Veracruz in on 19 May. Dandolo remained there through 1866, the only break being a period from 20 November to 18 December, when she sailed to Sisal, Mexico. The ship was not recalled when the Third Italian War of Independence broke out in June; as a result, she was the only modern Austrian warship not present at the Battle of Lissa. Dandolo eventually left Mexican waters on 14 March 1867.

=== 1869–1870 training cruise and the Franco-Prussian War ===
Dandolo was reactivated on 17 June 1869 for a short training cruise in the eastern Mediterranean. She embarked a group of naval cadets from the Naval Academy and sailed to Corfu; from there, she departed for Alexandria and Port Said in Ottoman Egypt. The trainees traveled through the Suez Canal aboard a local steamer before returning to Dandolo. The ship left Egypt on 31 July, passing through Rhodes, Zakynthos, Patras, and Brindisi on the way back to Pola. The ship then conducted shooting practice off Fasana before returning to Pola to make preparations for a longer voyage to South America. Dandolo got underway again on 3 November, passing through Corfu, Algiers, and Cartagena before arriving in Gibraltar. While there, the ship received word that the British steamer SS Crimean was in distress some 30 nautical miles (56 km; 35 mi) away, so she sailed to take the steamer under tow back to Gibraltar. While Dandolo was in Gibraltar, the port was visited by other vessels on training cruises, including the French screw ship of the line Jean Bart and the North German training ship Rover.

After leaving Gibraltar on 14 December, Dandolo arrived off the coast of Brazil on 12 January 1870. Over the following months, the ship toured several ports along the eastern coast of South America, including Rio de Janeiro, Brazil; Buenos Aires, Argentina; and Montevideo, Uruguay, among others. While in the region, the ship's crew struggled with outbreaks of Yellow fever that killed one of the cadets and sickened several others. Dandolo departed from Montevideo on 13 March and crossed the Atlantic to Simon's Bay, South Africa, arriving on 12 April. She later moved to Port Elizabeth, where on 5 May, a heavy storm broke two of the ship's anchor chains, and she was forced to steam at full power to avoid being blown aground. Dandolo departed for home on 24 May, passing through Cape Verde on 4 July and Faial Island on 26 July. While there, the ship received news of the outbreak of the Franco-Prussian War, so she used her engine to steam back to Gibraltar, arriving on 30 July.

During the Franco-Prussian War, the Kingdom of Italy began to make preparations to seize the Papal States, most significantly Rome. France had traditionally been the guarantor of the Pope's defense, but after the disastrous early campaign against Prussia, Franz Joseph decided to try to intimidate the Italians until the war ended and France was able to resume its historical role. Accordingly, the Austro-Hungarian Army mobilized along the Italian border and several warships were ordered to conduct a naval demonstration. Dandolo, then in Gibraltar, was recalled to join the flotilla, which was centered on the ironclad Habsburg. Novara and the gunboat Kerka joined them for the operation, which lasted from 19 August to 3 September. The four ships stopped in Naples from 27 to 31 August. By 3 September, the French had been decisively defeated at the Battle of Sedan, which convinced Franz Joseph to abandon the issue, since he was unwilling to go to war to prevent the Italian annexation of Rome.

=== Operations in the 1870s and fate ===
Dandolo remained in commission for the training squadron of 1870–1871; as of September 1870 the squadron also included Habsburg, the corvette Helgoland, Kerka, and the gunboats Reka and Hum. Dandolo initially left Naples in company with Kerka, but the two vessels separated when the latter required towing from Habsburg to transit the Strait of Messina. Dandolo sailed on alone, eventually arriving in Smyrna in the Ottoman Empire on 30 September, where she joined Habsburg. The two ships operated together for the next two months, cruising along the Ottoman coast, until 19 November, when Dandolo was detached to return home. After arriving in Pola, she was removed from active service on 18 January 1871 for repairs. By September, Dandolo had returned to the active squadron, which consisted of the same vessels as it had in 1870, with the exception of the gunboat Velebich replacing Helgoland. On 3 October, Dandolo was assigned to the reserve fleet for an annual inspection, which she passed on 4 November. The ship returned to the active squadron, but in January 1872, the squadron was reorganized, with largely new ships assigned to it. Dandolo was joined by the new ironclad Lissa, the frigate Novara, and the new corvette Zrinyi. But already on 5 February, Dandolo was detached for a training cruise to northern European waters. She sailed to Pola the next day to take on supplies for the voyage.

On 17 February, Dandolo got underway and sailed south through the Adriatic. After passing Messina, Sicily, and the southern coast of Sardinia, she anchored at Gibraltar on 16 March. There, she replenished food, water, and other supplies over the following four days before departing on 20 March. After passing Tarifa and entering the Atlantic, Dandolo encountered severe storms on 23 March that caused minor damage to her rigging and slowed progress north. By 1 April, she had reached the English Channel, and on the morning of 5 April, she entered the Thames, stopping first at Gravesend. The ship then moved upriver to London, where she stayed for the next three weeks. Departing on 25 April, she crossed over to visit Texel, the Netherlands, and then on the 27th she anchored in Nieuwediep. Dandolo got underway again on 2 May, sailing north back to Britain; four days later, she arrived in Leith, Scotland, where she lay until 25 May. The ship sailed back south to Gravesend, where she participated in celebrations marking the birthday of Queen Victoria on 1 June. The Austro-Hungarian ambassador to Britain, Friedrich Ferdinand von Beust, visited Dandolo in Gravesend on 9 June. The ship departed on 29 June and stopped in Cherbourg, France, from 3 to 9 July. By 1 August, she had moved to Portsmouth, UK, where the ship was visited by Crown Prince Edward. Dandolo departed for home soon thereafter, stopping in Lisbon, Portugal, on 22 August on the way. The ship eventually arrived back in Pola and on 14 November, she rejoined the active squadron.

The ships of the active squadron, including Dandolo, assembled off Fasana on 7 December. Dandolo was sent to Rovigno on 15 December to assist a Greek ship that had run aground near the city. Dandolo's crew refloated the Greek vessel, and the former escorted the latter into Rovigno later that evening. In late December, Dandolo and Zrinyi were ordered to sail to the eastern Mediterranean to patrol the Aegean Sea and the coast of Ottoman Syria and Egypt. Dandolo left Pola on 2 January 1873, bound for Piraeus, Greece; along the way, she stopped in Lissa, Corfu, and Argostoli. The ship arrived in Piraeus on 6 February, and over the following months, visited several ports in the region, including Salamis, Salonika, Syros, Souda, and Santorini. On 25 April, the ship departed Greek waters and sailed to Smyrna to protect Austro-Hungarian nationals in the area. On the night of 29 April, a fire broke out in the city, and Dandolo contributed men to fight the fire, which was successfully contained to a small area. On 5 May, Dandolo received orders to sail to Spain to protect Austro-Hungarians there; after sailing for eleven days, she stopped in Malta. An inspection there revealed the ship's boilers to be in an unusable condition. The naval command canceled her orders and sent the gunboat Velebich to Spain in her place; Dandolo returned to Pola on 6 June, where she was decommissioned on 19 June for repairs.

In the mid-1870s, Dandolo embarked on a series of training cruises for cadets from the naval academy. She recommissioned on 24 June 1874 for the first of these, which took the ship on a trip in the central Mediterranean. The voyage began on 29 June and saw the ship visit ports in Italy, including Messina in mid-July and Naples later that month. While in the latter port, Dandolo assisted an Italian merchant vessel that was in danger of being blown ashore by strong winds. Vice Admiral Enrico Di Brocchetti, the commander of naval forces in Naples, came aboard Dandolo to thank the crew for their assistance. The ship then sailed to Valletta, Malta in early August, where she met the British Mediterranean Fleet. Dandolo moved to Zakynthos on 8 August. Later that month, she began the voyage back to Pola, stopping in Corfu, Gravosa, Sebenico, and Fasana, along the way. She eventually arrived in Pola on 4 September. The ship sailed to Fiume on 7 September to disembark the cadets, before returning to Pola the following day.

Another voyage into the North and South Atlantic followed in 1875–1876. Finally, from 1877 to 1878, she made a third visit to North and South America, stopping in numerous foreign ports during the voyage. After returning home, Dandolo was decommissioned in 1879, and was converted into a gunnery training ship later that year. This role lasted for just two years, and over the course of 1881 and 1882, her propulsion system was removed so she could be used as a barracks ship. She was renamed Schwarzenberg in 1890 and thereafter stationed in Sebenico, once again as a training ship. She was eventually broken up in 1900–1901.
