= SMS Habsburg (1865) =

Ironclad warship of the Austro-Hungarian Navy

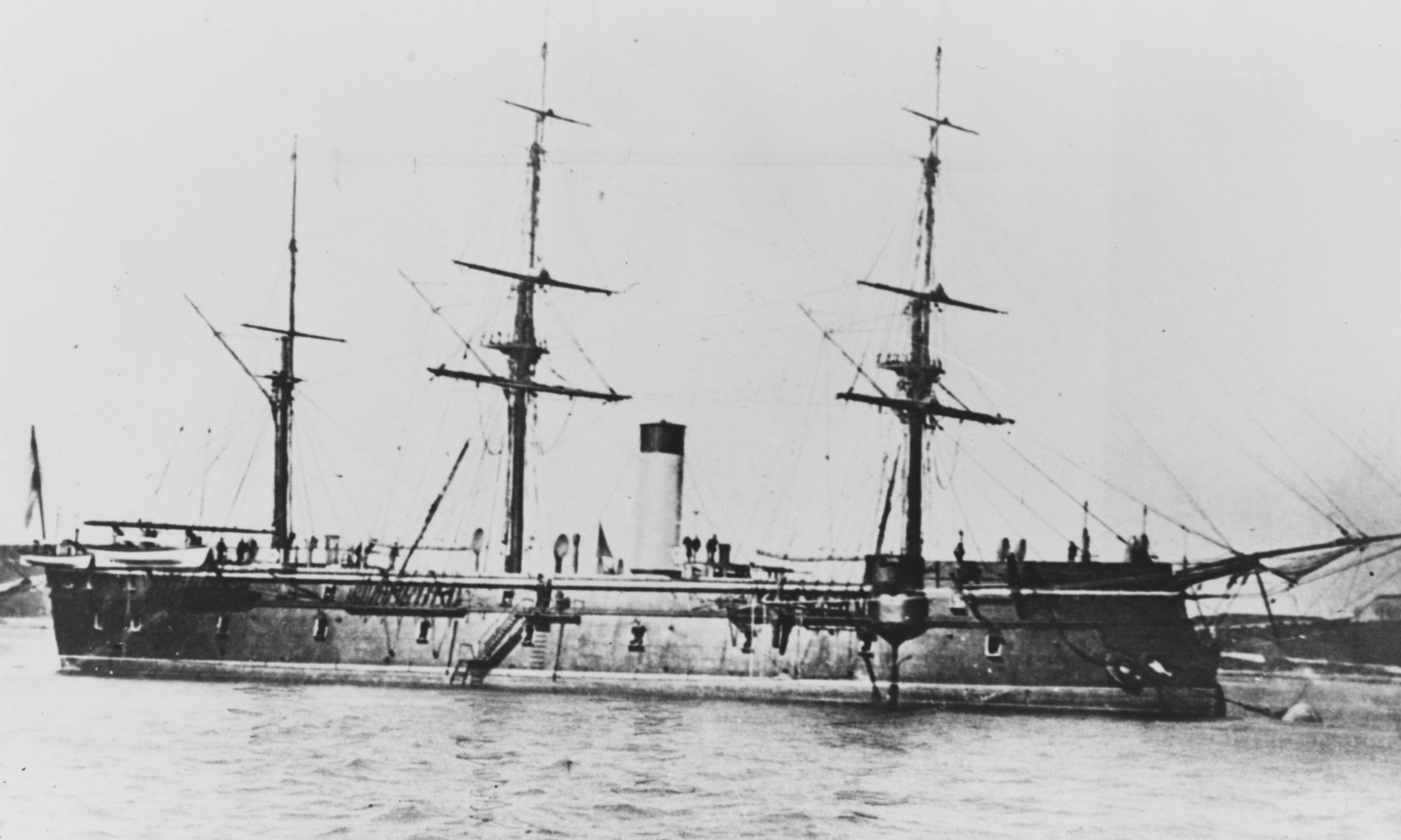
- Habsburg after her modernization

History

Austrian Empire
- Name: Habsburg
- Namesake: Habsburg
- Builder: Stabilimento Tecnico Triestino, Trieste
- Laid down: June 1863
- Launched: 24 June 1865
- Commissioned: June 1866
- Stricken: 22 October 1898
- Fate: Scrapped, 1899–1900

General characteristics
- Class & type: Erzherzog Ferdinand Max class
- Displacement: 5,130 long tons (5,210 t)
- Length: 83.75 meters (274 ft 9 in) oa
- Beam: 15.96 m (52 ft 4 in)
- Draft: 7.14 m (23 ft 5 in)
- Installed power: 2,925 indicated horsepower (2,181 kW)
- Propulsion: 1 × marine steam engine; 1 × screw propeller
- Speed: 12.54 knots (23.22 km/h; 14.43 mph)
- Crew: 511
- Armament: 16 × 48-pounder guns; 4 × 8-pounder guns; 2 × 3-pounder guns
- Armor: Battery: 123 mm (5 in); Ends: 87 mm (3.4 in)
- Notes: (Note: Figures are for the ship as built.)

SMS Habsburg was the second and final member of the Erzherzog Ferdinand Max class of broadside ironclads built for the Austrian Navy in the 1860s. She was built by the Stabilimento Tecnico Triestino; her keel was laid down in June 1863, she was launched in June 1865, and commissioning in June 1866 at the outbreak of the Third Italian War of Independence and the Austro-Prussian War, fought concurrently. The ship was armed with a main battery of sixteen 48-pounder guns, though the rifled guns originally intended, which had been ordered from Prussia, had to be replaced with old smoothbore guns until after the conflicts ended.

Habsburg saw action at the Battle of Lissa in July 1866, though she was not significantly engaged during the battle. In 1870, she was used in a show of force to try to prevent the Italian annexation of Rome while the city's protector, France, was distracted with the Franco-Prussian War, though the Italians took the city regardless. The ship's armament was revised several times in the 1870s and 1880s, before she was ultimately withdrawn from frontline service and employed as a guard ship and a barracks ship in Pola in 1886. She served in this role until 1898 when she was stricken from the naval register and broken up for scrap in 1899–1900.

== Description ==
Line-drawing of Erzherzog Ferdinand Max

The construction of the five ironclad warships of the Drache and Kaiser Max classes in the Austro-Italian ironclad arms race prompted the Austrian government to convene a commission in early 1862 to study future naval development, and crucially, the question of whether the navy should be oriented toward power projection from the Adriatic or purely defensive of the Austrian Littoral. The commission had deadlocked by April, but the recent Battle of Hampton Roads in the American Civil War—the first engagement between two ironclads—had demonstrated the ascendancy of the new ships and convinced the Reichsrat (Imperial Council) to grant a significant increase for the naval budget, which allowed two new ironclads to be ordered in 1863, which became the Erzherzog Ferdinand Max class.

Habsburg was 83.75 meters (274 ft 9 in) long overall; she had a beam of 15.96 m (52 ft 4 in) and an average draft of 7.14 m (23 ft 5 in). She displaced 5,130 long tons (5,210 t). She had a crew of 511 officers and enlisted men. Her propulsion system consisted of one single-expansion steam engine that drove a single screw propeller. The number and type of her coal-fired boilers have not survived, but they were vented through a single funnel located amidships. Her engine produced a top speed of 12.54 knots (23.22 km/h; 14.43 mph) from 2,925 indicated horsepower (2,181 kW).

Habsburg was a broadside ironclad, and she was armed with a main battery of sixteen 48-pounder muzzle-loading smooth-bore guns, eight guns per broadside. She also carried several smaller guns, including four 8-pounder guns and two 3-pounders. The ship's hull was sheathed with wrought iron armor that was 123 mm (4.8 in) thick on the battery and reduced to 87 mm (3.4 in) at the bow and stern.

== Service history ==
Map showing the disposition of the fleets on 20 July

Habsburg was built by the Stabilimento Tecnico Triestino shipyard in Trieste. Her keel was laid down in June 1863, and she was launched on 24 June 1865. The builders were forced to complete fitting-out work quickly, as tensions with neighboring Prussia and Italy erupted into the concurrent Austro-Prussian War and the Third Italian War of Independence in June 1866. Habsburg's rifled heavy guns were still on order from Krupp, and they could not be delivered due to the conflict with Prussia. Instead, the ship was armed with old smooth-bore guns. Rear Admiral Wilhelm von Tegetthoff, the commander of the Austrian Fleet, immediately began to mobilize his fleet. As the ships became fully crewed, they began to conduct training exercises in Fasana. On 26 June, Tegetthoff sortied with the Austrian fleet and steamed to Ancona in an attempt to draw out the Italians, but the Italian commander, Admiral Carlo Pellion di Persano, did not sortie to engage Tegetthoff. The Italian failure to give battle is frequently cited as an example of Persano's cowardice, but in fact, the Italian fleet was taking on coal and other supplies after the voyage from Taranto, and was not able to go to sea. Tegetthoff made another sortie on 6 July, but again could not bring the Italian fleet to battle.

=== Battle of Lissa ===
On 16 July, Persano took the Italian fleet, with twelve ironclads, out of Ancona, bound for the island of Lissa, where they arrived on the 18th. With them, they brought troop transports carrying 3,000 soldiers. Persano then spent the next two days bombarding the Austrian defenses of the island and unsuccessfully attempting to force a landing. Tegetthoff received a series of telegrams between the 17 and 19 July notifying him of the Italian attack, which he initially believed to be a feint to draw the Austrian fleet away from its main base at Pola and Venice. By the morning of the 19th, however, he was convinced that Lissa was in fact the Italian objective, and so he requested permission to attack. As Tegetthoff's fleet arrived off Lissa on the morning of 20 July, Persano's fleet was arrayed for another landing attempt. The latter's ships were divided into three groups, with only the first two able to concentrate in time to meet the Austrians. Tegetthoff had arranged his ironclad ships into a wedge-shaped formation, with Habsburg on the right flank; the wooden warships of the second and third divisions followed behind in the same formation.

While he was forming up his ships, Persano transferred from his flagship, Re d'Italia, to the turret ship Affondatore. This created a gap in the Italian line, and Tegetthoff seized the opportunity to divide the Italian fleet and create a melee. He made a pass through the gap, but failed to ram any of the Italian ships, forcing him to turn around and make another attempt. Habsburg was not as heavily engaged in the ensuing melee; she did not attempt to ram any Italian vessels, instead employed converging fire, though without success. During this period, the leading Italian ironclads, Principe di Carignano and Castelfidardo, opened fire at long range on Habsburg, Kaiser Max, and Salamander, though they only inflicted splinter damage on Salamander.

The battle ended after Tegetthoff's flagship, Erzherzog Ferdinand Max, rammed and sank Re d'Italia and heavy Austrian fire destroyed the coastal defense ship Palestro with a magazine explosion. Persano broke off the engagement, and though his ships still outnumbered the Austrians, he refused to counter-attack with his badly demoralized forces. In addition, the fleet was low on coal and ammunition. The Italian fleet began to withdraw, followed by the Austrians; Tegetthoff, having gotten the better of the action, kept his distance so as not to risk his success. In the course of the battle, Habsburg had fired 170 shells and had been hit 38 times in response, though she was not damaged and sustained no casualties. The Austrian fleet proceeded to Lissa and anchored in the harbor in Saint George Bay. That evening, Habsburg, Prinz Eugen, and a pair of gunboats patrolled outside the harbor.

=== Later 1860s ===
Habsburg in port, date unknown

After returning to Pola, Tegetthoff kept his fleet in the northern Adriatic, where it patrolled against a possible Italian attack. The Italian ships never came, and on 12 August, the two countries signed the Armistice of Cormons; this ended the fighting and led to the Treaty of Vienna. Though Austria had defeated Italy at Lissa and on land at the Battle of Custoza, the Austrian army was decisively defeated by Prussia at the Battle of Königgrätz. As a result of Austria's defeat, Kaiser Franz Joseph was forced to accede to Hungarian demands for greater autonomy, and the country became Austria-Hungary in the Ausgleich of 1867. The two halves of the Dual Monarchy held veto power over the other, and Hungarian disinterest in naval expansion led to severely reduced budgets for the fleet. In the immediate aftermath of the war, the bulk of the Austrian fleet was decommissioned and disarmed.

In 1869, Kaiser Franz Joseph took a tour of the Mediterranean Sea in his imperial yacht Greif; Habsburg was initially not assigned to the squadron that escorted him, but she had to be commissioned to replace Salamander after she developed machinery problems. The squadron also included Erzherzog Ferdinand Max, the screw corvette Helgoland, and a pair of paddle steamers, which escorted the Kaiser for the trip to Port Said at the mouth of the Suez Canal. The two ironclads remained in the Mediterranean while the other vessels passed through the Canal into the Red Sea in company with Empress Eugenie of France aboard her own yacht. The Austro-Hungarian ships eventually returned to Trieste in December. Habsburg and Erzherzog Ferdinand Max were detached on 16 November, steaming first to Souda Bay on the island of Crete, but severe storms forced them to seek shelter at Navarin on 25 November. They then sailed for Corfu, where they met Greif and the rest of the squadron, which soon departed. Habsburg and Erzherzog Ferdinand Max sailed independently to Pola, but heavy storms prompted Pöck to be concerned for the safety of Franz Joseph, so he sailed on to Trieste to see whether Greif had arrived or not. After he received word of Franz Joseph's arrival, Pöck took his ships back to Pola for maintenance following their cruise.

=== 1870s and fate ===
In January 1870, after repairs to Habsburg were completed, she sailed south to Cattaro Bay to reinforce a group of smaller vessels that had been sent there earlier in 1869 to suppress a rebellion against Austro-Hungarian rule. At that time, Habsburg was the sole Austro-Hungarian ironclad in active service, the rest having been disarmed and laid up in Pola. Over the summer, Habsburg cruised in the western Mediterranean with the screw-schooner Kerka. After repairs to her capstan were carried out, Habsburg left Pola and sailed first to Kumbor, where she met Kerka. The two ships then departed for Malta on 25 June, arriving there on 30 June. They left on 10 July for Tunis in the Beylik of Tunis, where they stayed for two days. The ships then sailed north to Cagliari on Corsica on 16 July. After arriving the next day, they stayed for four days and eventually arrived in Toulon, France, late on 2 August. Habsburg and Kerka stayed there for eight days, and then moved to Portoferraio, Italy, where they anchored from 11 to 14 August. By the 19th, they had moved to Naples.

These latter stops in Italian ports was part of a show of force intended to convince Italy not to try to annex Rome. The start of the Franco-Prussian War earlier that summer had prompted the withdrawal of the French garrison that guaranteed Rome's independence. Italy seemed likely to annex the city from the Papal States, so Franz Joseph decided to attempt to deter an Italian attack on Rome. Since Habsburg was the only capital ship available, she was sent to several Italian ports. She left Italian waters in September at the same time the Prussians decisively defeated the French at the Battle of Sedan. With the collapse of the Second French Empire, and Franz Joseph unwilling to unilaterally attack Italy to defend Rome, the Austro-Hungarians backed down and Italy seized the city.

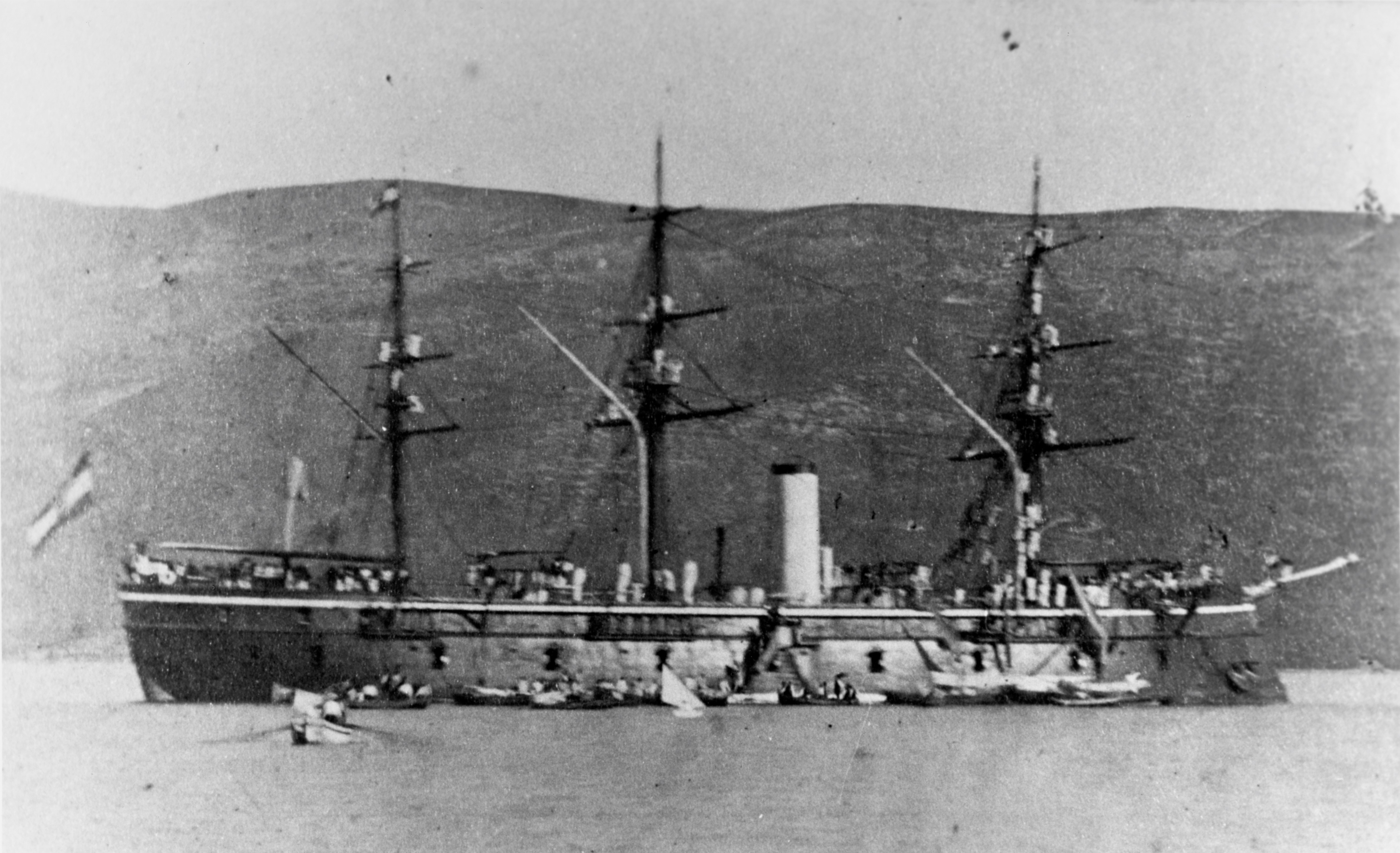
Habsburg, date unknown

Habsburg remained in commission for the training squadron of 1870–1871; as of September 1870 the squadron also included the corvettes Helgoland and Dandolo, Kerka, and the gunboats Reka and Hum. During this period, she served as the flagship of Commodore Georg von Millosicz, who was promoted to rear admiral in October. In the aftermath of the failed operation in Italy, Habsburg left Naples on 3 September and sailed for Smyrna in the Ottoman Empire. Soon after leaving port, Habsburg met Kerka, which required towing to pass through the Strait of Messina. After separating, Habsburg proceed to visit Messina, Corfu, and Milos before arriving in Smyrna on 19 September. Over the following months, she embarked on a series of short cruises along the Ottoman coast in company with Dandolo until late November, when the latter vessel left the area. Habsburg left Smyrna on 4 February 1871 to exchange crews and replenish stores in home waters. She passed through Corfu and Lissa on the way, arriving off Fasana on 13 February. There, her crew was replaced and additional supplies were taken aboard. Habsburg then continued on to Pola, where she had new fire-control equipment installed. The ship then sailed south to conduct shooting practice off Lissa.

After Habsburg concluded shooting practice on 24 March, Millosicz transferred to the gunboat Velebich, which had recently arrived in Lissa. Habsburg sailed for Gravosa, where she was soon joined by Velebich. Habsburg next moved to Souda Bay on Crete, where she met Kerka. The two ships then continued on to Smyrna to resume patrols along the Ottoman coast, sailing as far south as Ottoman Palestine. During periods in Smyrna, the ship's crew helped fight fires in the city, and later, assisted with flood recovery efforts. While in Beirut on 25 June, Habsburg participated in ceremonies marking the anniversary of the beginning of the reign of Sultan Abdulaziz. The ship then sailed back north, ultimately arriving in Urla, where she conducted training exercises. She then returned to Smyrna. By this time, her boilers were in poor condition and she stayed in Smyrna only briefly before departing to return home for repairs. Passing through Piraeus, Navarino, and Zakynthos, among other ports, she arrived in Pola on 21 August.

In 1874 Habsburg was rearmed with a battery of fourteen 7 in (178 mm) muzzle-loading Armstrong guns and four light guns. Her battery was revised again in 1882, with the addition of four 9 cm (3.5 in) breech-loading guns, two 7 cm (2.8 in) breech-loaders, a pair of 47 mm (1.9 in) quick-firing revolver guns, and three 25 mm (0.98 in) auto-cannon. Habsburg was withdrawn from service in 1886 and thereafter served as a guard ship and barracks ship in Pola. That year, these were removed and a single 26 cm (10.2 in) gun and a 24 cm (9.4 in) gun were installed. She was stricken from the naval register on 22 October 1898 and broken up for scrap in 1899–1900.
