= Stabilimento Tecnico Triestino =

Shipbuilding company

- Type: Defunct (merged 1929)
- Industry: Naval and commercial shipbuilding
- Founded: 1857
- Headquarters: Trieste, Austria (later Italy)
- Services: Ship repair

Stabilimento Tecnico Triestino (STT) ("Technical Establishment of Trieste") was a private shipbuilding company based in Trieste from the mid-19th to early 20th century, and the most important naval shipbuilding firm of the Austro-Hungarian Empire.

After World War I, Trieste was annexed by Italy and the firm built naval and commercial vessels for its new host country. STT was merged with another Italian shipbuilding firm, Cantiere Navale Triestino, in 1929 to form Cantieri Riuniti dell'Adriatico (CRDA). As CRDA Trieste, its shipyards remained active well into the postwar period, becoming part of the Fincantieri group in 1984.

== History ==
=== Austro-Hungarian ownership ===
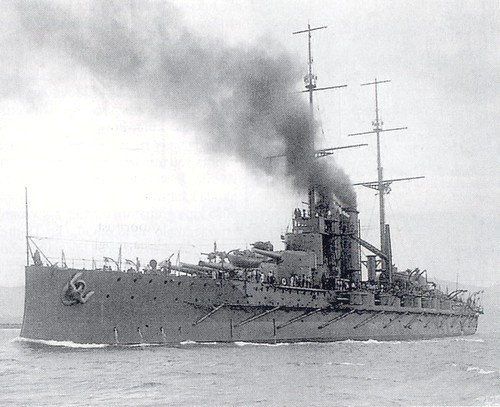
SMS Viribus Unitis, a dreadnought built by STT for the Austro-Hungarian Navy in 1911

Stabilimento Tecnico Triestino had its origins in a private shipyard founded by Gaspare Tonello at San Marco on the coastline west of Trieste, in 1838. In 1857 the shipyard was merged with a local manufacturer of marine engines to become STT. A second shipyard was also acquired, at San Rocco near the town of Muggia just south of Trieste.

STT was the largest and most important shipbuilder in the Austrian Empire and its successor state, the Austro-Hungarian Empire. The company built most of the Austro-Hungarian Navy's capital ships, as well as many merchant vessels. In the 1860s and 1870s, STT built five of the Austro-Hungarian Navy's seven centre-battery ships (a forerunner of the battleship), as well as a number of ironclads, cruisers, frigates and corvettes. Between 1884 and 1914, the company built 13 of the Austro-Hungarian Navy's 16 battleships, including all three battleships of the Habsburg class, all three of the Radetzky class, and three of the four Tegetthoff class. It also built the three coastal defence battleships of the Monarch class.

In 1909 Rudolf Montecuccoli, chief of the Austro-Hungarian Navy, pressured STT (together with Škoda) to start work on two dreadnoughts, Viribus Unitis and Tegetthoff, even though approval of the budget for them was held up in the Austro-Hungarian Reichstag who was concerned about Italy and France embarking on dreadnought projects of their own. Montecuccoli was compelled to resort to an intricate web of propaganda and deception to camouflage the fact that the new ships did not have Reichstag approval. He asserted that industry was financing the construction of two dreadnoughts on speculation; this was completely untrue, and both STT and Skoda were extremely nervous about the subterfuge. In the event, the two ships could not be laid down until after Montecuccoli took an expensive 32 million crown credit in 1910 upon his own responsibility. The parliamentary approval was only granted in March 1911, when the dreadnoughts were already under construction. STT then also got the contract for the Prinz Eugen.

By 1914, the San Rocco shipyard had five slipways of between 350 and 500 feet (three of which served to construct battleships) as well as a 350-foot dry dock and a 400-foot floating dock. The company had its own plant in Muggia for the manufacturer of engines and boilers, and a licence from the United Kingdom to produce Parsons steam turbines. In the years prior to World War I, the company's workforce had been gradually expanded from 2,700 to approximately 3,200.

Following Italy's entry into World War I against the Central Powers (which included Austria-Hungary), STT was stripped of its Italian name and given the patriotic German name Austriawerft. Austriawerft was contracted to build two new battleships during the war, but these were cancelled in 1915, probably due to the company's loss of skilled workers, most of whom were Italian. Two submarines contracted to the company later in the war also had to be cancelled due to the lack of experienced submarine technicians.

=== Italian ownership ===
After the Austro-Hungarian Empire broke up at the close of World War I, the region of Trieste was ceded to Italy and Austriawerft became an Italian firm, whereupon its original name, Stabilimento Tecnico Triestino, was restored. During the 1920s, STT built the heavy cruiser Trieste for the Italian navy, and the luxury commercial liner SS Conte Grande.

In 1929, STT merged with another Italian company, Cantieri Navale Triestino based at Monfalcone, to form Cantieri Riuniti dell' Adriatico (CRDA) (United Shipbuilders of the Adriatic), and the STT component was named CRDA Trieste. CRDA Trieste built a number of light and heavy cruisers for the Regia Marina Italia (Royal Italian Navy) between the wars, as well as some 27 submarines. The ocean liner SS Conte di Savoia was also constructed there in 1932.

During the Second World War, CRDA Trieste built two battleships for the Regia Marina, Vittorio Veneto and Roma. CRDA Trieste survived the postwar shakeup in the shipbuilding industry and went on to build several more commercial liners in the 1950s and 1960s, as well as a few naval vessels. In 1984, CRDA was sold to the Fincantieri Group, and its Trieste shipyards were no longer considered important ship construction or repair facilities. However, as of 2000, the shipyards still retained three dry docks capable of serving ships up to 25,000, 35,000 and 170,000 tons respectively.

== Production ==
=== STT (Austria-Hungary) ===
The following table lists the capital ships built for the Austro-Hungarian Navy. An asterisk denotes a unique ship.

Capital ships
Ship	Type	Class	Built	Disp.	Notes
Erzherzog Ferdinand Max	Ironclad	Erzherzog Ferdinand Max	1866	N/A	Scrapped 1917
Habsburg	Ironclad	Erzherzog Ferdinand Max	1866	N/A	Scrapped 1900
Vasilissa Olga	Ironclad	*	1869	2,000	Built for Greek Navy, scrapped 1925
Zrinyi (or Niclas Zrinyi)	Screw corvette	Zrinyi	1871	1,450	Scrapped after 1920
Lissa	Centre-battery	*	1871	7,178	Scrapped 1895
Radetzky	Screw frigate	Radetzky	1873	4,000	To Italy in 1919, scrapped 1921
Erzherzog Albrecht	Centre-battery	*	1874	6,500	To Italy in 1920, scrapped 1955
Laudon	Screw frigate	Radetzky	1875	4,000	To SHS 1919, to Italy in 1921, scrapped 1924
Custoza	Centre-battery	*	1875	7,700	To Italy in 1919, scrapped after collision, 1925
SMS Don Juan d'Austria	Centre-battery	Kaiser Max	1876	4,000	Sunk, 1919
Kaiser Max	Centre-battery	Kaiser Max	1878	4,000	To Serbo-Croatia 1920, sunk as breakwater, 1945
SMS Tegetthoff	Centre-battery	Tegetthoff	1881	8,000	To Italy in 1919, scrapped after 1921
SMS Kronprinzessin Erzherzogin Stephanie	Battleship	*	1887	5,631	To Italy in 1919, scrapped 1926
SMS Tiger	Torpedo cruiser	*	1888	1,683	To Italy in 1919, scrapped 1920
SMS Kaiser Franz Joseph I	Torpedo/ram cruiser	Kaiser Franz Joseph I	1890	4,500	Capsized and sank, Oct 1919
SMS Kaiserin Elisabeth	Torpedo/ram cruiser	Kaiser Franz Joseph I	1892	4,500	Scuttled Nov 1914 at Qingdao, China
SMS Kaiserin und Königin Maria Theresia	Armoured cruiser	*	1895	6,000	To United Kingdom in 1919, scrapped 1921
SMS Monarch	Coastal defence	Monarch	1898	5,878	To United Kingdom in 1919, scrapped 1921
SMS Wien	Coastal defence	Monarch	1898	5,878	Torpedoed 1916, salvaged 1925, fate unknown
SMS Budapest	Coastal defence	Monarch	1898	5,878	To United Kingdom in 1919, scrapped 1921
SMS Kaiser Karl VI	Armoured cruiser	*	1900	7,000	To United Kingdom in 1919, scrapped 1922
SMS Habsburg	Battleship	Habsburg	1902	N/A	To United Kingdom in 1919, scrapped 1922
SMS Árpád	Battleship	Habsburg	1903	N/A	To United Kingdom in 1919, scrapped 1922
SMS Babenberg	Battleship	Habsburg	1904	N/A	To United Kingdom in 1919, scrapped 1922
SMS Erzherzog Karl	Battleship	Erzherzog Karl	1906	11,000	To France in 1919, scrapped 1921
SMS Erzherzog Friedrich	Battleship	Erzherzog Karl	1907	11,000	To France in 1919, scrapped 1921
SMS Erzherzog Ferdinand Max	Battleship	Erzherzog Karl	1907	11,000	To United Kingdom in 1919, scrapped 1921
SMS Erzherzog Franz Ferdinand	Battleship	Radetzky	1908	15,000	To Italy in 1918, scrapped 1922
SMS Radetzky	Battleship	Radetzky	1911	16,000	To South Slavic 1918, scrapped 1922
SMS Zrínyi	Battleship	Radetzky	1911	16,000	To South Slavic 1918, scrapped 1922
SMS Tegetthoff	Battleship	Tegetthoff	1913	21,000	To South Slavic in 1918, to Italy in 1918, scrapped in 1924
SMS Viribus Unitis	Battleship	Tegetthoff	1912	21,000	To South Slavic in 1918, scrapped 1920–1922
SMS Prinz Eugen	Battleship	Tegetthoff	1914	21,000	To South Slavic in 1918, to Italy in 1919, to France in 1920, sunk as target 1922
SMS Ersatz Monarch	Battleship	Ersatz Monarch	N/A	25,000	Cancelled 1915
SMS Ersatz Budapest	Battleship	Ersatz Monarch	N/A	25,000	Cancelled 1915

References: Conway's All the World's Fighting Ships 1860–1905 Historical Handbook of World Navies website, Naval History Flixco website

=== STT (Italy) ===
The following table lists ships built by STT after the Italian takeover.

Production
Ship	Type	Class	Built	Disp.	Notes
Trieste	Cruiser	Trento	1926	13,545	Sunk by bombing, 1943
SS Conte Grande	Ocean liner	N/A	1928	25,661	Scrapped 1961

Reference: Winklareth p. 292

=== CRDA Trieste ===
The following table lists ships built at the former STT shipyards after the company's 1929 merger with Cantieri Navale Triestino to form CRDA.

Production
Ship	Type	Class	Built	Disp.	Notes
Various	Submarines	N/A	1931–40	N/A	27 submarines
Fiume	Cruiser	Zara	1931	14,530	Sunk 1941
Luigi Cadorna	Light cruiser	Condottieri	1931	7,113	Scrapped, 1951
SS Conte di Savoia	Ocean liner	N/A	1932	48,502	Scuttled 1943
Muzio Attendolo	Light cruiser	Montecuccoli	1935	8,994	Sunk by bombing, 1942
Giuseppe Garibaldi	Light cruiser	Duca degli Abruzzi	1937	11,735	Converted to guided missile cruiser, 1957, scrapped 1972
Vittorio Veneto	Battleship	Littorio	1940	45,752	Scrapped 1946?
Roma	Battleship	Littorio	1942	45,752	Sunk by bombing, 1943
Donizetti	Ocean liner	N/A	1951	N/A	N/A
Rossini	Ocean liner	N/A	1951	N/A	N/A
Verdi	Ocean liner	N/A	1951	N/A	N/A
MS Augustus	Ocean liner	N/A	1952	27,090	operating as restaurant ship, MS Philippines, in 1999. Sold for scrap in 2012
SS Raffaello	Ocean liner	N/A	1965	45,933	Sold to Iran and converted as floating barracks, 1977, sunk by bombing in 1983

Reference: Winklareth pp. 292–293
