= SM U-28 (Austria-Hungary) =

Austro-Hungarian U-27 class submarine

History

Austria-Hungary
- Name: SM U-28
- Ordered: 12 October 1915
- Builder: Cantiere Navale Triestino, Pola
- Launched: 8 January 1917
- Commissioned: 26 June 1917
- Fate: Scrapped 1920

Service record
- Commanders: Zdenko Hudeček; 26 June 1917 – 31 October 1918; Franz Rzemenowsky von Trautenegg; 2 July – 31 October 1918
- Victories: 9 merchant ships sunk (41,060 GRT); 1 auxiliary warship sunk (3,683 GRT); 1 merchant ship damaged (5,592 GRT)

General characteristics
- Type: U-27-class submarine
- Displacement: 264 t (260 long tons) surfaced; 301 t (296 long tons) submerged
- Length: 121 ft 1 in (36.91 m)
- Beam: 14 ft 4 in (4.37 m)
- Draft: 12 ft 2 in (3.71 m)
- Propulsion: 2 × propeller shafts; 2 × diesel engines, 270 bhp (200 kW) total; 2 × electric motors, 280 shp (210 kW) total
- Speed: 9 knots (17 km/h; 10 mph) surfaced; 7.5 knots (14 km/h; 9 mph) submerged
- Complement: 23–24
- Armament: 2 × 45 cm (17.7 in) bow torpedo tubes; 4 torpedoes; 1 × 75 mm/26 (3.0 in) deck gun; 1 × 8 mm (.323 cal) machine gun

SM U-28 or U-XXVIII was a U-27-class U-boat or submarine for the Austro-Hungarian Navy. U-28, built by the Austrian firm of Cantiere Navale Triestino (CNT) at the Pola Navy Yard, was launched in January 1917 and commissioned in June.

She had a single hull and was just over 121 feet (37 m) in length. She displaced nearly 265 metric tons (261 long tons) when surfaced and over 300 metric tons (295 long tons) when submerged. Her two diesel engines moved her at up to 9 knots (17 km/h; 10 mph) on the surface, while her twin electric motors propelled her up to 7.5 knots (13.9 km/h; 8.6 mph) while underwater. She was armed with two bow torpedo tubes and could carry a load of up to four torpedoes. She was also equipped with a 75-millimetre (3.0 in) deck gun and a machine gun.

During her service career, U-28 sank the British Q-ship HMS Bradford City and nine other ships, sending a combined tonnage of 44,743 to the bottom. U-28 was surrendered at Venice in 1919, granted to Italy as a war reparation and broken up the following year.

== Design and construction ==
Austria-Hungary's U-boat fleet was largely obsolete at the outbreak of World War I. The Austro-Hungarian Navy satisfied its most urgent needs by purchasing five Type UB I submarines that comprised the U-10 class from Germany, by raising and recommissioning the sunken French submarine Curie as U-14, (Note: Curie had been caught in an anti-submarine net while trying to enter the harbor at Pola on 20 December 1914. See: Gardiner, p. 343.) and by building four submarines of the U-20 class that were based on the 1911 Danish Havmanden class. (Note: The plans for the Danish Havmanden-class submarines, three of which were built in Austria-Hungary, were seized from Whitehead & Co. in Fiume. See: Gardiner, pp. 344, 354.)

After these steps alleviated their most urgent needs, the Austro-Hungarian Navy selected the German Type UB II design for its newest submarines in mid 1915. The Germans were reluctant to allocate any of their wartime resources to Austro-Hungarian construction, but were willing to sell plans for up to six of the UB II boats to be constructed under license in Austria-Hungary. The Navy agreed to the proposal and purchased the plans from AG Weser of Bremen.

U-28 displaced 264 metric tons (260 long tons) surfaced and 301 metric tons (296 long tons) submerged. She had a single hull with saddle tanks, and was 121 feet 1 inch (36.91 m) long with a beam of 14 feet 4 inches (4.37 m) and a draft of 12 feet 2 inches (3.71 m). For propulsion, she had two shafts, twin diesel engines of 270 brake horsepower (200 kW) for surface running, and twin electric motors of 280 shp (210 kW) for submerged travel. She was capable of 9 knots (17 km/h; 10 mph) while surfaced and 7.5 knots (13.9 km/h; 8.6 mph) while submerged. Although there is no specific notation of a range for U-28 in Conway's All the World's Fighting Ships 1906–1921, the German UB II boats, upon which the U-27 class was based, had a range of over 6,000 nautical miles (11,000 km; 6,900 mi) at 5 knots (9.3 km/h; 5.8 mph) surfaced, and 45 nautical miles (83 km; 52 mi) at 4 knots (7.4 km/h) submerged. U-27-class boats were designed for a crew of 23–24.

U-28 was armed with two 45 cm (17.7 in) bow torpedo tubes and could carry a complement of four torpedoes. She was also equipped with a 75 mm (3.0 in)/26 caliber deck gun and an 8 mm (0.31 in) machine gun.

After intricate political negotiations to allocate production of the class between Austrian and Hungarian firms, U-28 was ordered from Cantiere Navale Triestino (CNT) on 12 October 1915. She was laid down by early 1916 at the Pola Navy Yard, (Note: By this time, the CNT shipyards at Monfalcone had been overrun by the Italian Army. See: Baumgartner and Sieche, as excerpted here (reprinted and translated into English by Sieche). Retrieved 17 January 2008.) and launched on 8 January 1917.

== Service career ==
After her completion, U-28 was commissioned into the Austro-Hungarian Navy on 26 June 1917 under the command of Linienschiffsleutnant Zdenko Hudeček. Previously in command of U-17, Hudeček was a 30-year-old native of Theresienstadt (present-day Terezín in the Czech Republic). Four days after the U-boat's commissioning, Hudeček achieved his first kill at the helm of U-28. On 30 June, while on patrol about 40 nautical miles (74 km) east of Malta, U-28 came upon the 4,809 GRT British steamer Haigh Hall. The turret hull ship was carrying wheat from Bombay to Naples when torpedoed and sunk by Hudeček. Three days later, the British India passenger ship Mongara met the same fate. Even though escorted by an Italian destroyer and a trawler, Mongara was torpedoed and sunk by U-28 just 1.5 nautical miles (2.8 km) from the breakwater at Messina. The 8,205 GRT liner—the largest ship sunk by U-28—was en route from Sydney to London when she went down, but was spared any loss of life in the attack. In eight days in commission, U-28's tally was over 13,000 GRT, already exceeding the totals of all four U-boats of the U-20 class.

The following month, U-28 sank the 3,881 GRT collier Maston 35 nautical miles (65 km) from Cape Spartivento, Calabria, on 13 August, killing two men of the British ship's crew. Three days after Maston went down, U-28 sank HMS Bradford City, a 3,683 GRT British Q ship in the Straits of Messina, with no loss of life. HMS Bradford City, operating under the pseudonym Saros, had been particularly detached to the Straits to hunt U-28 and had ignored orders to proceed to port from officers unaware of her naval status. After the torpedo struck, the ship's "panic party" had taken to the boats in the hope of luring her attacker to the surface, but the arrival of the French naval trawler Hiver drove U-28 away before the gun crews aboard HMS Bradford City could engage the submarine. HMS Bradford City sank within 30 minutes off San Remo. In October, U-28 closed out her 1917 list of victims with Bontnewydd, a British steamer sunk 60 nautical miles (110 km) north-northeast of Susa. The 3,296 GRT steamer was sailing in ballast from Marseille for Karachi.

In January 1918, U-28 sank an additional three ships. Bosforo, an Italian steamer of 2,723 GRT headed for Salonika, was sent to the bottom near Cape Spartivento on 12 January. The following day, U-28 dispatched the British steamer Rapallo 1.5 nautical miles (2.8 km) south of Cape Peloro. One sailor aboard the one-year-old ship died in the attack, which occurred while the ship was headed to Messina in ballast. On 21 January, West Wales, a collier headed from Barry to Alexandria, was sunk 140 nautical miles (260 km) from Malta, taking her load of coal and two of her crew to the bottom.

On 8 March, U-28 attacked two ships, sinking one of them. The first ship, Mitra, a 5,592 GRT tanker was hit by U-28 but was able to make port in Malta with her cargo of oil. (Note: Mitra lived somewhat of a charmed life. The 1912 ship had survived the explosion of a mine laid by German U-boat UC-25 in June 1917, in addition to weathering the attack from U-28. The ship, renamed Liberatador in 1935, remained in service until 1950, when she was scrapped at Buenos Aires. See: "Mitra (1132749)". Miramar Ship Index.) Later in the month, U-28 sank Uganda 32 nautical miles (59 km) from Linosa, killing one sailor in the attack. The 1905 British ship was carrying cotton and cottonseed from Alexandria for London when the attack occurred. Three days later, Stolt Nielsen, a 5,684 GRT steamship, was sent to the bottom 38 nautical miles (70 km) from Malta. Carrying a general cargo for the Admiralty when she went down, the British ship turned out to be the final ship to be sunk by U-28.

At the war's end, U-28 was surrendered to Italy at Venice in 1919. Later awarded to Italy as a war reparation, she was scrapped at Venice in 1920. In her 18-month career, U-28 sank ten ships with a combined tonnage of 44,743, and damaged an eleventh.

== Summary of raiding history ==
Ships sunk or damaged by SM U-28
Date	Name	Nationality	Tonnage (Note: Merchant ship tonnages are in gross register tons. Military vessels are listed by tons displacement.)	Fate
30 June 1917	Haigh Hall	United Kingdom	4,809	Sunk
3 July 1917	Mongara	United Kingdom	8,205	Sunk
13 August 1917	Maston	United Kingdom	3,881	Sunk
16 August 1917	HMS Bradford City	Royal Navy	3,683	Sunk
5 October 1917	Bontnewydd	United Kingdom	3,296	Sunk
12 January 1918	Bosforo	Kingdom of Italy	2,723	Sunk
13 January 1918	Rapallo	United Kingdom	3,811	Sunk
21 January 1918	West Wales	United Kingdom	4,336	Sunk
8 March 1918	Mitra	United Kingdom	5,592	Damaged
8 March 1918	Uganda	United Kingdom	4,315	Sunk
11 March 1918	Stolt Nielsen	United Kingdom	5,684	Sunk
		Sunk: Damaged: Total:	44,743; 5,592; 50,335	

== Bibliography ==
- Baumgartner, Lothar; Sieche, Erwin (1999). Die Schiffe der k.(u.)k. Kriegsmarine im Bild = Austro-Hungarian warships in photographs (in German). Wien: Verlagsbuchhandlung Stöhr. ISBN 978-3-901208-25-6. OCLC 43596931.
- Gardiner, Robert, ed. (1985). Conway's All the World's Fighting Ships 1906–1921. Annapolis, Maryland: Naval Institute Press. ISBN 978-0-87021-907-8. OCLC 12119866.
- Gibson, R. H.; Prendergast, Maurice (2003) [1931]. The German Submarine War, 1914–1918. Annapolis, Maryland: Naval Institute Press. ISBN 978-1-59114-314-7. OCLC 52924732.
- Gilbert, Martin (2004) [1994]. The First World War: A Complete History. New York: Owl Books. ISBN 978-0-8050-7617-2. OCLC 57246229.
- Grant, Robert M. (2002) [1964]. U-boats Destroyed: The Effect of Anti-submarine Warfare, 1914–1918. Penzance: Periscope. ISBN 978-1-904381-00-6. OCLC 50215640.
- Halpern, Paul G. (1994). A Naval History of World War I. Annapolis, Maryland: Naval Institute Press. ISBN 978-0-87021-266-6. OCLC 28411665.
- Hepper, David (2006). British Warship Losses in the Ironclad Era 1860 – 1919. London: Chatham Publishing. ISBN 978-1-86176-273-3.
- Miller, David (2002). The Illustrated Directory of Submarines of the World. St. Paul, Minnesota: MBI Pub. Co. ISBN 978-0-7603-1345-9. OCLC 50208951.
