= SM U-41 (Austria-Hungary) =

Austro-Hungarian U-27 class submarine

History

Austria-Hungary
- Name: SM U-41
- Builder: Cantiere Navale Triestino, Pola
- Laid down: 23 February 1917
- Launched: 11 November 1917
- Commissioned: 19 February 1918
- Fate: Scrapped 1920

Service record
- Commanders: Edgar Wolf; 19 February – 31 October 1918
- Victories: 1 merchant ship sunk (4,604 GRT)

General characteristics
- Type: U-27-class submarine
- Displacement: 280 t (276 long tons) surfaced; 326 t (321 long tons) submerged
- Length: 121 ft 1 in (36.91 m)
- Beam: 14 ft 4 in (4.37 m)
- Draft: 12 ft 2 in (3.71 m)
- Propulsion: 2 × propeller shafts; 2 × diesel engines, 270 bhp (200 kW) total; 2 × electric motors, 280 shp (210 kW) total
- Speed: 9 knots (17 km/h) surfaced; 7.5 knots (14 km/h) submerged
- Complement: 23–24
- Armament: 2 × 45 cm (17.7 in) bow torpedo tubes; 4 torpedoes; 1 × 75 mm/26 (3.0 in) deck gun; 1 × 8 mm (0.31 in) machine gun

SM U-41 or U-XLI was a U-27 class U-boat or submarine for the Austro-Hungarian Navy. U-41, built by the Austrian firm of Cantiere Navale Triestino (CNT) at the Pola Navy Yard, was launched in November 1917. When she was commissioned in February 1918, she became the last boat of her class to enter service. She was also the last domestically constructed Austro-Hungarian U-boat to enter service.

She had a single hull just over 122 feet (37 m) in length. She displaced 280 metric tons (276 long tons) when surfaced and over 325 metric tons (320 long tons) when submerged. Her two diesel engines moved her at up to 9 knots (17 km/h) on the surface, while her twin electric motors propelled her at up to 7.5 knots (13.9 km/h) while underwater. She was armed with two bow torpedo tubes and could carry a load of up to four torpedoes. She was also equipped with a 75 mm (3.0 in) deck gun and a machine gun.

During a short service career marred by repeated engine breakdowns, U-41 sank one ship, the French steamer Amiral Charner of 4,604 gross register tons (GRT). U-41 was at Cattaro at war's end, and was ceded to France as a war reparation in 1920. She was towed to Bizerta and broken up within a year.

== Design and construction ==
Austria-Hungary's U-boat fleet was largely obsolete at the outbreak of World War I. The Austro-Hungarian Navy satisfied its most urgent needs by purchasing five Type UB I submarines that comprised the U-10 class from Germany, by raising and recommissioning the sunken French submarine Curie as U-14, (Note: Curie had been caught in an anti-submarine net while trying to enter the harbor at Pola on 20 December 1914. See: Gardiner, p. 343.) and by building four submarines of the U-20 class that were based on the 1911 Danish Havmanden class. (Note: The plans for the Danish Havmanden class submarines, three of which were built in Austria-Hungary, were seized from Whitehead & Co. in Fiume. See: Gardiner, pp. 344, 354.)

Once these steps had alleviated their most urgent needs, the Austro-Hungarian Navy selected the German Type UB II design for its newest submarines in mid 1915. The Germans were reluctant to allocate any of their wartime resources to Austro-Hungarian construction, but were willing to sell plans for up to six of the UB II boats to be constructed under license in Austria-Hungary. The Navy agreed to the proposal and purchased the plans from AG Weser of Bremen, one of the two German shipyards building UB II submarines.

U-41 displaced 280 metric tons (276 long tons) surfaced and 326 metric tons (321 long tons) submerged. She had a single hull with saddle tanks, and was planned to be 121 feet 1 inch (36.91 m) long with a beam of 14 feet 4 inches (4.37 m) and a draft of 12 feet 2 inches (3.71 m). For propulsion, she had two shafts, twin diesel engines of 270 bhp (200 kW) for surface running, and twin electric motors of 280 shp (210 kW) for submerged travel. She was capable of 9 knots (16.7 km/h) while surfaced and 7.5 knots (13.9 km/h) while submerged. Although there is no specific notation of a range for U-41 in Conway's All the World's Fighting Ships 1906–1921, the German UB II boats, upon which the U-27 class was based, had a range of over 6,000 nautical miles (11,000 km) at 5 knots (9.3 km/h) surfaced, and 45 nautical miles (83 km) at 4 knots (7.4 km/h) submerged. U-27-class boats were designed for a crew of 23–24.

U-41 was armed with two 45 cm (17.7 in) bow torpedo tubes and could carry a complement of four torpedoes. She was also equipped with a 75 mm/26 (3.0 in) deck gun and an 8 mm (0.31 in) machine gun.

U-41 was ordered from Cantiere Navale Triestino (CNT) as a replacement for U-6 (which had been sunk in May 1916). She was laid down on 23 February 1917 at the Pola Navy Yard. (Note: By this time, the CNT shipyards at Monfalcone had been overrun by the Italian Army. See: Baumgartner and Sieche, as excerpted here (reprinted and translated into English by Sieche). Retrieved 21 January 2008.) During construction, U-41 was lengthened by nearly 30 centimetres (12 in) to accommodate diesel engines that had been ordered for U-6 before her loss. U-41 was launched on 11 November.

== Service career ==
On 19 February 1918, SM U-41 was commissioned into the Austro-Hungarian Navy under the command of Linienschiffsleutnant Edgar Wolf. Previously in command of U-4 for a week in April 1915, the 28-year-old Wolf was a native of Fiume (present-day Rijeka, Croatia). When she entered service, U-41 was the last boat of her class to do so. She was also the last domestically constructed U-boat completed and commissioned into the Austro-Hungarian Navy. Wolf and U-41 departed Pola on 17 March for a patrol in the Mediterranean. On 30 March, Wolf attempted to torpedo a steamer off the coast of Africa, but missed his target. Three days later, the left diesel engine failed and Wolf steered his boat back to port, arriving at Cattaro on 5 April. U-41 sailed for Pola on 9 April and, completing the journey two days later, underwent repairs over the next six weeks. While conducting a diving trial out of Pola on 25 May, the boat sprang a leak at the depth of 50 metres (160 ft). She returned to Pola and underwent more extensive repairs, remaining there until August.

After making way to the submarine base at Brioni, U-41 set out on another patrol into the Mediterranean on 29 August, but put into Šibenik the next day for engine repairs. Resuming her patrol after a day's delay, U-41 reached her patrol area east of Malta. Wolf and U-41 scored their first success on 13 September, when they torpedoed and sank the steamer Amiral Charner west of Pantellaria. The 4,604 gross register tons (GRT) French ship was carrying horses and a general cargo from Marseille for Salonika when she was attacked. Six were killed in the attack on the French ship. On 26 September, U-41 attacked another steamer west of Kefalonia, but was apparently unsuccessful. (Note: Uboat.net reports no ships sunk in the Mediterranean on 26 September 1918. See: Helgason, Guðmundur. "Ships hit by KUK U41". German and Austrian U-boats of World War I - Kaiserliche Marine - Uboat.net.) U-41 ended her patrol at Cattaro on 28 September.

On October 6, Wolf and U-41 set out from Cattaro to patrol off Durazzo and the Albanian coast. After nine days without success, the boat returned to Cattaro, and remained there through the end of the war. On 1 November, U-41 was taken over by a British commission, who controlled the vessel until she was ceded to France as a war reparation in 1920. U-41 and sister boats U-29 and U-31 were towed to Bizerta. U-29 foundered en route, but U-31 and U-41 reached their destination and were scrapped within the next year.

== Summary of raiding history ==
Ships sunk or damaged by SM U-41
Date	Name	Nationality	Tonnage	Fate
13 September 1918	Amiral Charner	France	4,604	Sunk
		Sunk: Total:	4,604; 4,604	

== Bibliography ==
- Baumgartner, Lothar; Erwin Sieche (1999). Die Schiffe der k.(u.)k. Kriegsmarine im Bild = Austro-Hungarian warships in photographs (in German). Wien: Verlagsbuchhandlung Stöhr. ISBN 978-3-901208-25-6. OCLC 43596931.
- Gardiner, Robert; Gray, Randal, eds. (1985). Conway's All the World's Fighting Ships 1906–1921. Annapolis, Maryland: Naval Institute Press. ISBN 978-0-87021-907-8. OCLC 12119866.
- Gibson, R. H.; Prendergast, Maurice (2003) [1931]. The German Submarine War, 1914–1918. Annapolis, Maryland: Naval Institute Press. ISBN 978-1-59114-314-7. OCLC 52924732.
- Halpern, Paul G. (1994). A Naval History of World War I. Annapolis, Maryland: Naval Institute Press. ISBN 978-0-87021-266-6. OCLC 28411665.
- Tarrant, V. E. (1989). The U-Boat Offensive: 1914–1945. Annapolis, Maryland: Naval Institute Press. ISBN 978-0-87021-764-7. OCLC 20338385.
