= SM U-29 (Austria-Hungary) =

Austro-Hungarian U-27 class submarine

History

Austria-Hungary
- Name: SM U-29
- Ordered: 12 October 1915
- Builder: Ganz Danubius, Fiume
- Laid down: 3 March 1916
- Launched: 21 October 1916
- Commissioned: 21 January 1917
- Fate: Foundered while under tow, 1919

Service record
- Commanders: Leo Prásil; 21 January 1917 – 14 August 1918; Friedrich Sterz; 4–29 September 1918; Robert Dürrigl; 29 September – 1 November 1918
- Victories: 3 merchant ships sunk (14,784 GRT); 1 warship damaged (7,350 tons)

General characteristics
- Type: U-27-class submarine
- Displacement: 264 t (260 long tons) surfaced; 301 t (296 long tons) submerged
- Length: 121 ft 1 in (36.91 m)
- Beam: 14 ft 4 in (4.37 m)
- Draft: 12 ft 2 in (3.71 m)
- Propulsion: 2 × propeller shafts; 2 × diesel engines, 270 bhp (200 kW) total; 2 × electric motors, 280 shp (210 kW) total
- Speed: 9 knots (17 km/h) surfaced; 7.5 knots (14 km/h) submerged
- Complement: 23–24
- Armament: 2 × 45 cm (17.7 in) bow torpedo tubes; 4 torpedoes; 1 × 75 mm/26 (3.0 in) deck gun; 1 × 8 mm (.323 cal) machine gun

SM U-29 or U-XXIX was a U-27 class U-boat or submarine for the Austro-Hungarian Navy. U-29, built by the Hungarian firm of Ganz Danubius at Fiume, was launched in October 1916 and commissioned in January 1917.

U-29 had a single hull and was just over 121 feet (37 m) in length. She displaced nearly 265 metric tons (261 long tons) when surfaced and over 300 metric tons (295 long tons) when submerged. Her two diesel engines moved her at up to 9 knots (17 km/h) on the surface, while her twin electric motors propelled her at up to 7.5 knots (13.9 km/h) while underwater. She was armed with two bow torpedo tubes and could carry a load of up to four torpedoes. She was also equipped with a 75 mm (3.0 in) deck gun and a machine gun.

During her service career, U-29 sank three ships and damaged one warship, sending a combined tonnage of 14,784 to the bottom. U-29 was at Fiume at war's end and was surrendered at Venice in March 1919. She was granted to France as war reparation in 1920, but foundered while under tow to Bizerta for scrapping.

== Design and construction ==
Austria-Hungary's U-boat fleet was largely obsolete at the outbreak of World War I. The Austro-Hungarian Navy satisfied its most urgent needs by purchasing five Type UB I submarines that comprised the U-10 class from Germany, by raising and recommissioning the sunken French submarine Curie as U-14, (Note: Curie had been caught in an anti-submarine net while trying to enter the harbor at Pola on 20 December 1914. See: Gardiner, p. 343.) and by building four submarines of the U-20 class that were based on the 1911 Danish Havmanden class. (Note: The plans for the Danish Havmanden class submarines, three of which were built in Austria-Hungary, were seized from Whitehead & Co. in Fiume. See: Gardiner, pp. 344, 354.)

After these steps alleviated their most urgent needs, the Austro-Hungarian Navy selected the German Type UB II design for its newest submarines in mid 1915. The Germans were reluctant to allocate any of their wartime resources to Austro-Hungarian construction, but were willing to sell plans for up to six of the UB II boats to be constructed under license in Austria-Hungary. The Navy agreed to the proposal and purchased the plans from AG Weser of Bremen.

U-29 displaced 264 metric tons (260 long tons) surfaced and 301 metric tons (296 long tons) submerged. She had a single hull with saddle tanks, and was 121 feet 1 inch (36.91 m) long with a beam of 14 feet 4 inches (4.37 m) and a draft of 12 feet 2 inches (3.71 m). For propulsion, she had two shafts, twin diesel engines of 270 bhp (200 kW) for surface running, and twin electric motors of 280 shp (210 kW) for submerged travel. She was capable of 9 knots (16.7 km/h) while surfaced and 7.5 knots (13.9 km/h) while submerged. Although there is no specific notation of a range for U-29 in Conway's All the World's Fighting Ships 1906–1921, the German UB II boats, upon which the U-27 class was based, had a range of over 6,000 nautical miles (11,000 km) at 5 knots (9.3 km/h) surfaced, and 45 nautical miles (83 km) at 4 knots (7.4 km/h) submerged. U-27-class boats were designed for a crew of 23–24.

U-29 was armed with two 45 cm (17.7 in) bow torpedo tubes and could carry a complement of four torpedoes. She was also equipped with a 75 mm/26 (3.0 in) deck gun and an 8 mm (0.31 in) machine gun.

After intricate political negotiations to allocate production of the class between Austrian and Hungarian firms, U-27 was ordered from Ganz Danubius on 12 October 1915. She was laid down on 3 March 1916 at Fiume and launched on 21 October.

== Service career ==
U-29 underwent diving trials at Fiume and then made her way to Pola on 29 November 1916. There, on 21 January 1917, SM U-29 was commissioned into the Austro-Hungarian Navy under the command of Linienschiffleutnant Leo Prásil. Prásil, a 29-year-old native of Pola, had previously served as commander of U-10.

U-29 departed on her first patrol on 23 January, destined for duty in the Mediterranean. The next day, however, the U-boat encountered a severe storm near Lussin that damaged her. Prásil steered the boat into the harbor at Brgulje to wait out the storm. Departing Brgulje on the 25th to resume her journey to the Mediterranean, the submarine developed a leak when performing a test dive. U-29 headed back to Pula for repairs, which lasted until 30 January. On 5 February the U-boat set out for Cattaro, which she reached after three days journey.

Prásil took U-29 out of Cattaro on 17 February to begin the delayed patrol in the Mediterranean, but on the 20th encountered another severe storm. Suffering no damage in the tempest, the boat continued on. On 24 February, she had an at-sea rendezvous with U-43. On 1 March the U-boat's gyrocompass broke down, necessitating a return to port. Two days later, as she neared Cattaro, U-29 encountered yet another storm, this one again damaging the ship. The beleaguered U-boat headed back to the base at Pula for more repairs, and remained there until early April.

On 4 April, U-29 set out from Pula, touched at Cattaro, and continued on into the Mediterranean for her second patrol there. While 25 nautical miles (46 km) from Cape Matapan, Prásil torpedoed and sank the steamer Dalton, traveling in ballast. U-29 took the master of the 3,486 GRT British ship captive; three other men lost their lives in the attack. Five days later and some 115 nautical miles (213 km) away, U-29 torpedoed Mashobra, a British India Line passenger steamer of 8,173 GRT. The ship, en route from Calcutta to London with a general cargo, was finished off by U-29's deck gun. As with Dalton, Mashobra's master was taken prisoner. Eight persons died in the attack. U-29's gyrocompass broke down again on 17 April, once again forcing the boat to return for repairs. U-29's second Mediterranean tour ended when Prásil docked the boat at Cattaro on 19 April.

U-29's third Mediterranean deployment began on 8 May when she departed Cattaro. After eleven days at sea, Prásil torpedoed the British cargo ship Mordenwood 90 nautical miles (170 km) from Cape Matapan. U-29 took the 3,125 GRT ship's master captive. Two sources disagree on the number of casualties when Mordenwood went down, but place the number at either 21 or 31. Escorting destroyers launched a depth charge attack on U-29 but did not succeed in damaging the U-boat. Two days later, U-29 launched a torpedo attack on the British steamer Marie Suzanne but did not sink the ship. U-29 arrived at Cattaro on 25 May.

After a brief time in port, U-29 set out for the Mediterranean again on 17 June. One day out, the U-boat came under attack from an airplane out of Valona, compelling U-29 to crash dive; none of the three bombs dropped by the aircraft hit their mark. U-29's patrol ended without success when she docked at Cattaro on 6 July. After a return to Pola on 12 July, the U-boat underwent extensive repairs that kept her out of action for the next nine months.

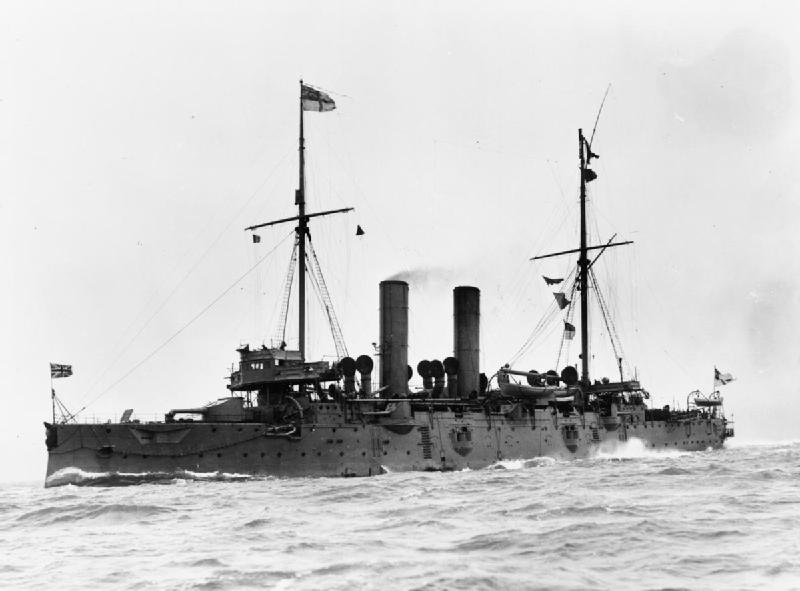
HMS Edgar was torpedoed by U-29 on 4 April 1918 but survived the attack. Edgar was the only warship torpedoed by U-29

On 16 March 1918, the newly refitted boat sailed from Pola to Cattaro, departing that port for another Mediterranean tour on 25 March. Near Valona the next day, an Italian destroyer attempted to ram U-29, scraping one of her propellers against U-29's conning tower. The damage done was slight and U-29 continued on into the Mediterranean, weathering a storm in the Ionian Sea on the 27th. On 4 April, U-29 launched a torpedo attack on what was thought to be a cargo ship. In fact, it was the British protected cruiser Edgar which had been hit. Edgar was damaged but did not sink; she suffered no casualties in the attack. The following day Prásil attempted to torpedo a ship in a convoy but missed and was exposed to a depth charge attack by the convoy's escorts. The U-boat ended the patrol with no further successes.

In June, the Austro-Hungarian Navy planned an assault on the Otranto Barrage, similar to a May 1917 action that evolved into the Battle of Otranto Straits. U-29 was deployed from Cattaro on 9 June in advance of the attack. One of the seven separate groups participating in the attack, the two dreadnoughts Tegetthoff and Szent István, came under attack from Italian MAS torpedo boats in the early morning hours of 10 June. Szent István was hit and sank just after 06:00, and the entire operation was called off. U-29 returned to Cattaro on 12 June. Over the next two months, U-29 operated in the Adriatic out of Cattaro, patrolling off Durazzo and the Albanian coast.

While at Cattaro, command of U-29 passed to Linienschiffleutnant Friedrich Sterz on 4 September. The 27-year-old native of Pergine, Tyrolia (in present-day Italy), had previously commanded U-22 and, like Prásil, had also served a stint as commander of U-10. After assuming command of U-29, Sterz set sail for Durazzo the same day. The U-boat had encounters with MAS torpedo boats on 9 and 12 September. On the latter date, U-29 had to crash dive to avoid a bombing attack from Allied airplanes. None of the seven bombs hit their mark and U-29 returned to Cattaro on 16 September.

Linienschiffleutnant Robert Dürrigl replaced Sterz as commander on 29 September. The Galician Dürrial, like both Stertz and Prásil, had served as the commander of U-10, but had most recently commanded U-21. A day after assuming command, Dürrial headed for the Albanian coast in U-29 and patrolled off Durazzo.

After the Armistice with Bulgaria on 29 September ended Bulgaria's participation in the war, Durazzo gained importance to the remaining Central Powers as the main port for supplying their forces fighting in the Balkans. Anticipating this, the Allies put together a force to bombard Durazzo. While the second echelon of the attacking force got into position to bombard the town, U-29 and sister boat U-31 maneuvered to attack. While U-31 was able to hit and damage the British cruiser Weymouth, U-29 was blocked by screening ships and herself attacked. The Allied escorts (mainly American submarine chasers) subjected U-29 to a heavy depth charge attack. U-29 was able to make her way back to Cattaro on 8 October.

Over the next three weeks, U-29 patrolled between Cattaro and Antivari, Montenegro. After her arrival back at Cattaro on 1 November, U-29 was moored between the coastal battleship Monarch and U-14. There she remained until she was awarded to France as a war reparation in 1920. U-29 was towed, along with sister boats U-31 and U-41, from Cattaro for Bizerta for scrapping, but foundered on the way. In total, U-29 sank three ships with a combined tonnage of 14,784, and damaged one warship.

== Summary of raiding history ==
Ships sunk or damaged by SM U-29
Date	Name	Nationality	Tonnage (Note: Merchant ship tonnages are in gross register tons. Military vessels are listed by tons displacement.)	Fate
10 April 1917	Dalton	United Kingdom	3,486	Sunk
15 April 1917	Mashobra	United Kingdom	8,173	Sunk
19 May 1917	Mordenwood	United Kingdom	3,125	Sunk
4 April 1918	HMS Edgar	Royal Navy	7,350	Damaged
		Sunk: Damaged: Total:	14,784; 7,350; 22,134	

== Notes ==
3. Josef Guenther Lettenmaier, who served on U 29 as "Maschinenquartiermeister", roughly equivalent to Machinist Mate 2nd Class, documented his experiences in the Austro-Hungarian Navy and aboard U 29 as historical fiction in "Rot-Weiss-Rot zur See", published by Tyrolia Verlag, Innsbruck, 1934. Lettenmaier's book is the only published record of the K.u.k. U-Waffe written by "other ranks".

== Bibliography ==
- Baumgartner, Lothar; Erwin Sieche (1999). Die Schiffe der k.(u.)k. Kriegsmarine im Bild = Austro-Hungarian warships in photographs (in German). Wien: Verlagsbuchhandlung Stöhr. ISBN 978-3-901208-25-6. OCLC 43596931.
- Gardiner, Robert; Gray, Randal, eds. (1985). Conway's All the World's Fighting Ships 1906–1921. Annapolis, Maryland: Naval Institute Press. ISBN 978-0-87021-907-8. OCLC 12119866.
- Gibson, R. H.; Prendergast, Maurice (2003) [1931]. The German Submarine War, 1914–1918. Annapolis, Maryland: Naval Institute Press. ISBN 978-1-59114-314-7. OCLC 52924732.
- Halpern, Paul G. (1994). A Naval History of World War I. Annapolis, Maryland: Naval Institute Press. ISBN 978-0-87021-266-6. OCLC 28411665.
- Miller, David (2002). The Illustrated Directory of Submarines of the World. St. Paul, Minnesota: MBI Pub. Co. ISBN 978-0-7603-1345-9. OCLC 50208951.
- Tennent, A. J. (2006) [1990]. British Merchant Ships Sunk by U boats in the 1914–1918 War. Penzance: Periscope Publishing. ISBN 1-904381-36-7.
