= SM U-32 (Austria-Hungary) =

Austro-Hungarian U-27 class submarine

History

Austria-Hungary
- Name: SM U-32
- Ordered: 12 October 1915
- Builder: Ganz Danubius, Fiume
- Laid down: 18 July 1916
- Launched: 11 May 1917
- Commissioned: 29 June 1917
- Fate: Scrapped 1920

Service record
- Commanders: Gaston Vio; 29 June 1917 – 24 April 1918; Otto Kasseroller; 24 April – 31 October 1918
- Victories: 4 merchant ships sunk (3,728 GRT); 1 merchant ship damaged (3,060 GRT)

General characteristics
- Type: U-27-class submarine
- Displacement: 264 t (260 long tons) surfaced; 301 t (296 long tons) submerged
- Length: 121 ft 1 in (36.91 m)
- Beam: 14 ft 4 in (4.37 m)
- Draft: 12 ft 2 in (3.71 m)
- Propulsion: 2 × propeller shafts; 2 × diesel engines, 270 bhp (200 kW) total; 2 × electric motors, 280 shp (210 kW) total
- Speed: 9 knots (17 km/h) surfaced; 7.5 knots (14 km/h) submerged
- Complement: 23–24
- Armament: 2 × 45 cm (17.7 in) bow torpedo tubes; 4 torpedoes; 1 × 75 mm/26 (3.0 in) deck gun; 1 × 8 mm (.323 cal) machine gun

SM U-32 or U-XXXII was a U-27 class U-boat or submarine for the Austro-Hungarian Navy. U-32, built by the Hungarian firm of Ganz Danubius at Fiume, was launched in May 1917 and commissioned in June.

U-32 had a single hull and was just over 121 feet (37 m) in length. She displaced nearly 265 metric tons (261 long tons) when surfaced and over 300 metric tons (295 long tons) when submerged. Her two diesel engines moved her at up to 9 knots (17 km/h; 10 mph) on the surface, while her twin electric motors propelled her at up to 7.5 knots (13.9 km/h; 8.6 mph) while underwater. She was armed with two bow torpedo tubes and could carry a load of up to four torpedoes. She was also equipped with a 75 mm (3.0 in) deck gun and a machine gun.

In her service career U-32 hit five ships of 6,788 gross register tons (GRT), sinking four and damaging one. At Pola at war's end, the boat was handed over to Italy and scrapped in 1920.

== Design and construction ==
Austria-Hungary's U-boat fleet was largely obsolete at the outbreak of World War I. The Austro-Hungarian Navy satisfied its most urgent needs by purchasing five Type UB I submarines that comprised the U-10 class from Germany, by raising and recommissioning the sunken French submarine Curie as U-14, (Note: Curie had been caught in an anti-submarine net while trying to enter the harbor at Pola on 20 December 1914. See: Gardiner, p. 343.) and by building four submarines of the U-20 class that were based on the 1911 Danish Havmanden class. (Note: The plans for the Danish Havmanden class submarines, three of which were built in Austria-Hungary, were seized from Whitehead & Co. in Fiume. See: Gardiner, pp. 344, 354.)

After these steps alleviated their most urgent needs, the Austro-Hungarian Navy selected the German Type UB II design for its newest submarines in mid 1915. The Germans were reluctant to allocate any of their wartime resources to Austro-Hungarian construction, but were willing to sell plans for up to six of the UB II boats to be constructed under license in Austria-Hungary. The Austro-Hungarian Navy agreed to the proposal and purchased the plans from AG Weser of Bremen.

U-32 displaced 264 metric tons (260 long tons) surfaced and 301 metric tons (296 long tons) submerged. She had a single hull with saddle tanks, and was 121 feet 1 inch (36.91 m) long with a beam of 14 feet 4 inches (4.37 m) and a draft of 12 feet 2 inches (3.71 m). For propulsion, she had two shafts, twin diesel engines of 270 bhp (200 kW) for surface running, and twin electric motors of 280 shp (210 kW) for submerged travel. She was capable of 9 knots (16.7 km/h) while surfaced and 7.5 knots (13.9 km/h) while submerged. Although there is no specific notation of a range for U-32 in Conway's All the World's Fighting Ships 1906–1921, the German UB II boats, upon which the U-27 class was based, had a range of over 6,000 nautical miles (11,000 km) at 5 knots (9.3 km/h) surfaced, and 45 nautical miles (83 km) at 4 knots (7.4 km/h) submerged. U-27-class boats were designed for a crew of 23–24.

U-32 was armed with two 45 cm (17.7 in) bow torpedo tubes and could carry a complement of four torpedoes. She was also equipped with a 75 mm/26 (3.0 in) deck gun and an 8 mm (0.31 in) machine gun.

After intricate political negotiations to allocate production of the class between Austrian and Hungarian firms, U-27 was ordered from Ganz Danubius on 12 October 1915. She was laid down on 18 July 1916 at Fiume and launched on 11 May 1917.

== Service career ==
After launching, the U-boat made her way to Pola, where, on 29 April 1917, SM U-32 was commissioned into the Austro-Hungarian Navy under the command of Linienschiffleutnant Gaston Vio. Vio, a 30-year-old native of Fiume, was a first-time submarine commander. Vio and U-32 began their first patrol on 3 July when they sailed from Pola for a Mediterranean deployment. East of Manfredonia two days later, an enemy submarine launched a spread of three torpedoes at U-32 but the Austro-Hungarian submarine avoided them all. Two days later, U-32 had an at-sea rendezvous with the German U-boat UC-52. The following day, Vio failed to hit a steamer in the Gulf of Taranto.

On 15 July, U-32 launched torpedoes against the British steamer Incemore. Hit 225 nautical miles (417 km) east-southeast of Malta, the 3,060 gross register tons (GRT) ship was en route from Marseille to Salonika when she was attacked. Incemore was damaged but continued on her way; no one aboard the steamer was killed in the attack. (Note: Incemore was not so lucky the following month when the German U-38 attacked and sank her 52 nautical miles (96 km) from Pantelleria.) The U-boat docked in Cattaro to end her first patrol four days later.

The next Mediterranean patrol for U-32 began on 14 August. Sister boat U-40 met up with her at sea on 29 August. Two days later, U-32 stopped a Greek sailing vessel, Agios Georgios and examined her, but let her go on her way. Vio put in his boat at Cattaro on 4 September, ending the boat's second patrol. On 12 October, U-32 departed Cattaro for Durazzo, arriving the next day. On the 18th, the submarine departed there for Brindisi, screening for a sortie by the Austro-Hungarian cruiser Helgoland and a destroyer group. When U-32 reached Brindisi the following day, she was greeted by Italian torpedo boats which dropped five depth charges over her. After putting in at Cattaro on the 19th, she quickly departed for Pola to repair damage to her conning tower.

After two months of repairs at Pola, U-32 set out on 27 December but had to return with engine problems. She departed for the Mediterranean the following day and cruised between Alexandria and Malta, but returned to Cattaro in late January 1918 without success. Another patrol beginning in late February was similarly fruitless and U-32 returned to Cattaro empty-handed again on 26 March.

While at Cattaro, Vio was relieved of command on 24 April and replaced by Linienschiffleutnant Otto Kasseroller, who had formerly been in command of U-2. Kasseroller was a 31-year-old Salzburg native. On 8 May, U-32 began her first cruise with Kasseroller at the helm. Five days out, the Greek sailing ship Julia was stopped near Cape Matapan. After allowing Julia's crew to board a lifeboat, Kasseroller sank Julia with fire from the U-boat's deck gun. After the 48 GRT ship was sunk, U-32 towed the lifeboat close to the shore. As a result, none of the Greek ship's crew died in the attack.

A week later, on 20 May, U-32 sank two more Greek sailing ships: the 58 GRT Agios Dionysios, and the 30 GRT Angeliki. The following day Kasseroller torpedoed a British steamer. Chatham, of 3,592 GRT, was headed from Karachi to Marseille with grain and onions when U-32 sent her down 80 nautical miles (150 km) from Cape Matapan. Continuing her most successful patrol, U-32 met with the German UB-48 off the coast of Africa on 3 June, but returned to Cattaro on the 6th.

During the remainder of June and into July, U-32 patrolled in the Adriatic out of Cattaro, calling at the Albanian ports of Durazzo and San Giovanni di Medua. Continuing this same duty into August, U-32 was forced to crash dive to avoid an attack by another submarine on 19 August. Five days later an airplane attacked the U-boat, dropping a total of five bombs. After the attack, U-32 made her way to Cattaro and, in early September, headed back to Pola. After making a stop at Fiume, the submarine docked at Pola on 13 September and remained there through the end of the war. She was ceded to Italy as a war reparation, and scrapped in 1920. In total, U-32 sank four ships and damaged one other ship, hitting a combined total of 6,788 GRT.

== Summary of raiding history ==
Ships sunk or damaged by SM U-32
Date	Name	Nationality	Tonnage	Fate
15 July 1917	Incemore	United Kingdom	3,060	Damaged
13 May 1918	Julia	Greece	48	Sunk
20 May 1918	Agios Dionysios	Greece	58	Sunk
20 May 1918	Angeliki	Greece	30	Sunk
21 May 1918	Chatham	United Kingdom	3,592	Sunk
		Sunk: Damaged: Total:	3,728; 3,060; 6,788	

== Bibliography ==
- Baumgartner, Lothar; Erwin Sieche (1999). Die Schiffe der k.(u.)k. Kriegsmarine im Bild = Austro-Hungarian warships in photographs (in German). Wien: Verlagsbuchhandlung Stöhr. ISBN 978-3-901208-25-6. OCLC 43596931.
- Gardiner, Robert; Gray, Randal, eds. (1985). Conway's All the World's Fighting Ships 1906–1921. Annapolis, Maryland: Naval Institute Press. ISBN 978-0-87021-907-8. OCLC 12119866.
- Gibson, R. H.; Prendergast, Maurice (2003) [1931]. The German Submarine War, 1914–1918. Annapolis, Maryland: Naval Institute Press. ISBN 978-1-59114-314-7. OCLC 52924732.
- Halpern, Paul G. (1994). A Naval History of World War I. Annapolis, Maryland: Naval Institute Press. ISBN 978-0-87021-266-6. OCLC 28411665.
- Miller, David (2002). The Illustrated Directory of Submarines of the World. St. Paul, Minnesota: MBI Pub. Co. ISBN 978-0-7603-1345-9. OCLC 50208951.
