= SM U-30 (Austria-Hungary) =

Austro-Hungarian U-27 class submarine

History

Austria-Hungary
- Name: SM U-30
- Ordered: 12 October 1915
- Builder: Ganz Danubius, Fiume
- Laid down: 9 March 1916
- Launched: 27 December 1916
- Commissioned: 17 February 1917
- Fate: Disappeared after 31 March 1917

Service record
- Commanders: Friedrich Fähndrich; 17 February – April 1917
- Victories: None

General characteristics
- Type: U-27-class submarine
- Displacement: 264 t (260 long tons) surfaced; 301 t (296 long tons) submerged
- Length: 121 ft 1 in (36.91 m)
- Beam: 14 ft 4 in (4.37 m)
- Draft: 12 ft 2 in (3.71 m)
- Propulsion: 2 × propeller shafts; 2 × diesel engines, 270 bhp (200 kW) total; 2 × electric motors, 280 shp (210 kW) total
- Speed: 9 knots (17 km/h) surfaced; 7.5 knots (14 km/h) submerged
- Complement: 23–24
- Armament: 2 × 45 cm (17.7 in) bow torpedo tubes; 4 torpedoes; 1 × 75 mm/26 (3.0 in) deck gun; 1 × 8 mm (.323 cal) machine gun

SM U-30 or U-XXX was a U-27 class U-boat or submarine of the Austro-Hungarian Navy. U-30, built by the Hungarian firm of Ganz Danubius at Fiume, was launched in December 1916 and commissioned in February 1917.

U-30 had a single hull and was just over 121 feet (37 m) in length. She displaced nearly 265 metric tons (261 long tons) when surfaced and over 300 metric tons (295 long tons) when submerged. Her two diesel engines moved her at up to 9 knots (17 km/h) on the surface, while her twin electric motors propelled her at up to 7.5 knots (13.9 km/h) while underwater. She was armed with two bow torpedo tubes and could carry a load of up to four torpedoes. She was also equipped with a 75 mm (3.0 in) deck gun and a machine gun.

U-30 sank no ships during her brief service career. She departed from Cattaro on 31 March 1917 and was never heard from again. She may have succumbed to a mine in the Otranto Barrage but her fate remains a mystery.

== Design and construction ==
Austria-Hungary's U-boat fleet was largely obsolete at the outbreak of World War I. The Austro-Hungarian Navy satisfied its most urgent needs by purchasing five Type UB I submarines that comprised the U-10 class from Germany, by raising and recommissioning the sunken French submarine Curie as U-14, (Note: Curie had been caught in an anti-submarine net while trying to enter the harbor at Pola on 20 December 1914. See: Gardiner, p. 343.) and by building four submarines of the U-20 class that were based on the 1911 Danish Havmanden class. (Note: The plans for the Danish Havmanden class submarines, three of which were built in Austria-Hungary, were seized from Whitehead & Co. in Fiume. See: Gardiner, pp. 344, 354.)

After these steps alleviated their most urgent needs, the Austro-Hungarian Navy selected the German Type UB II design for its newest submarines in mid 1915. The Germans were reluctant to allocate any of their wartime resources to Austro-Hungarian construction, but were willing to sell plans for up to six of the UB II boats to be constructed under license in Austria-Hungary. The Navy agreed to the proposal and purchased the plans from AG Weser of Bremen.

U-30 displaced 264 metric tons (260 long tons) surfaced and 301 metric tons (296 long tons) submerged. She had a single hull with saddle tanks, and was 121 feet 1 inch (36.91 m) long with a beam of 14 feet 4 inches (4.37 m) and a draft of 12 feet 2 inches (3.71 m). For propulsion, she had two shafts, twin diesel engines of 270 bhp (200 kW) for surface running, and twin electric motors of 280 shp (210 kW) for submerged travel. She was capable of 9 knots (16.7 km/h) while surfaced and 7.5 knots (13.9 km/h) while submerged. Although there is no specific notation of a range for U-30 in Conway's All the World's Fighting Ships 1906–1921, the German UB II boats, upon which the U-27 class was based, had a range of over 6,000 nautical miles (11,000 km) at 5 knots (9.3 km/h) surfaced, and 45 nautical miles (83 km) at 4 knots (7.4 km/h) submerged. U-27-class boats were designed for a crew of 23–24.

U-30 was armed with two 45 cm (17.7 in) bow torpedo tubes and could carry a complement of four torpedoes. She was also equipped with a 75 mm/26 (3.0 in) deck gun and an 8 mm (0.31 in) machine gun.

After intricate political negotiations to allocate production of the class between Austrian and Hungarian firms, U-27 was ordered from Ganz Danubius on 12 October 1915. She was laid down on 9 March 1916 at Fiume and launched on 27 December.

== Service career ==
U-30 began diving trials on 8 January 1917, and made her first underwater cruise on 27 January. On 1 February, she successfully reached a depth of 30 metres (98 ft) in compression tests. Four days later she took on a crew for a training voyage, and made her way to Pola. At that port, on 21 January 1917, SM U-30 was commissioned into the Austro-Hungarian Navy under the command of Linienschiffsleutnant Friedrich Fähndrich. Fähndrich, a 29-year-old native of Budapest, had previously served as commander of U-15.

U-30 departed on her first patrol on 26 February, for duty off Cape Matapan and the Gulf of Taranto. During the patrol, U-30 did not encounter any hostile ships, but did encounter a storm that caused extensive damage. Cutting short her cruise with damage to the parapet on her conning tower, a missing radio aerial, and a broken gyrocompass, U-30 arrived in Cattaro on 16 March for repairs.

With the repairs complete, U-30 set out from Cattaro on 31 March and was never heard from again. Author Paul Halpern suggests that a mine in the Otranto Barrage might have been responsible. Authors R. H. Gibson and Maurice Prendergast report that there is no evidence in Allied records to indicate the possible fate of the U-boat, and conclude that the fate of U-30 remains a mystery, and "is likely to remain so for ever [sic]". U-30 was not credited with the sinking of any ships in her brief career. She was also the only member of the U-27-class to be lost during the war.

== Bibliography ==
- Baumgartner, Lothar; Erwin Sieche (1999). Die Schiffe der k.(u.)k. Kriegsmarine im Bild = Austro-Hungarian warships in photographs (in German). Wien: Verlagsbuchhandlung Stöhr. ISBN 978-3-901208-25-6. OCLC 43596931.
- Gardiner, Robert; Gray, Randal, eds. (1985). Conway's All the World's Fighting Ships 1906–1921. Annapolis, Maryland: Naval Institute Press. ISBN 978-0-87021-907-8. OCLC 12119866.
- Gibson, R. H.; Prendergast, Maurice (2003) [1931]. The German Submarine War, 1914–1918. Annapolis, Maryland: Naval Institute Press. ISBN 978-1-59114-314-7. OCLC 52924732.
- Greger, Rene (1987). "The Mystery of the Austro-Hungarian Submarine U-30: Some Facts, Observations and Speculation". Warship International. XXIV (1): 81–83. ISSN 0043-0374.
- Halpern, Paul G. (1994). A Naval History of World War I. Annapolis, Maryland: Naval Institute Press. ISBN 978-0-87021-266-6. OCLC 28411665.
- Miller, David (2002). The Illustrated Directory of Submarines of the World. St. Paul, Minnesota: MBI Pub. Co. ISBN 978-0-7603-1345-9. OCLC 50208951.
