= U-27-class submarine (Austria-Hungary) =

Austro-Hungarian Navy submarines during WWI

- The lead boat of the U-27 class of submarines, SM U-27, is seen here at her launch on 19 October 1916.

Class overview
- Builders: Cantiere Navale Triestino, Pola (4); Ganz Danubius, Fiume (4)
- Operators: Austro-Hungarian Navy
- Preceded by: U-20 class
- Succeeded by: U-43 class
- Built: 1916–1917
- In commission: 1917–1918
- Completed: 8
- Lost: 2
- Preserved: 0

General characteristics
- Type: submarine
- Displacement: 264 t (291 short tons) surfaced; 301 t (332 short tons) submerged
- Length: 121 ft 1 in (36.91 m)
- Beam: 14 ft 4 in (4.37 m)
- Draft: 12 ft 2 in (3.71 m)
- Propulsion: 2 × shaft; 2 × diesel engine, 270 bhp (200 kW) total; 2 × electric motor, 280 shp (210 kW) total
- Speed: 9 knots (17 km/h) surfaced; 7.5 knots (14 km/h) submerged
- Complement: 23–24
- Armament: 2 × 45 cm (17.7 in) bow torpedo tubes; 4 torpedoes; 1 × 75 mm/26 (3.0 in) deck gun; 1 × 8 mm (.323 cal) machine gun

The U-27 class was a class of eight submarines or U-boats built for and operated by the Austro-Hungarian Navy (German: Kaiserliche und Königliche Kriegsmarine or K.u.K. Kriegsmarine) during World War I. The class was based upon the German Type UB II design of the German Imperial Navy and was constructed under license in Austria-Hungary.

After the Austro-Hungarian Navy had filled its most urgent needs for submarines after the outbreak of World War I, they selected the German Type UB II design for its next group of submarines in mid 1915. Orders for the first six boats were placed in October 1915 with the Austrian firm of Cantiere Navale Triestino and the Hungarian firm of Ganz Danubius. Two more boats were ordered in 1916, bringing the class total to eight.

The boats were just over 121 feet (37 m) long and were armed with two bow torpedo tubes, a deck gun, and a machine gun. For propulsion they were equipped with twin diesel engines for surface running and twin electric motors for subsurface movement. Although the class was based on the German design, the Austro-Hungarian U-boats were heavier and slightly faster underwater, but less heavily armed than their German counterparts

All eight boats were commissioned into the Austro-Hungarian Navy between 1917 and 1918 and saw active service during the war. SM U-27 and SM U-28 were the most successful in terms of ships sunk and gross register tonnage sunk, respectively. Two boats sank only one ship each, and a third, SM U-30, sank no ships. U-30 was also the only boat of the class to be lost during the war. The remaining seven were ceded to France and Italy as war reparations and six were scrapped by 1920; the seventh sank while being towed to Bizerta for scrapping.

== Background ==
Austria-Hungary's U-boat fleet was largely obsolete at the outbreak of World War I. The Austro-Hungarian Navy satisfied its most urgent needs by purchasing five Type UB I submarines that comprised the U-10 class from Germany, by raising and recommissioning the sunken French submarine Curie as U-14, (Note: Curie had been caught in an anti-submarine net while trying to enter the harbor at Pola on 20 December 1914. See: Gardiner, p. 343.) and by building four submarines of the U-20 class that were based on the 1911 Danish Havmanden class. (Note: The plans for the Danish Havmanden-class submarines, three of which were built in Austria-Hungary, were seized from Whitehead & Co. in Fiume. See: Gardiner, pp. 344, 354.)

After these steps alleviated their most urgent needs, the Austro-Hungarian Navy selected the German Type UB II design for its newest submarines in mid 1915. The Germans were reluctant to allocate any of their wartime resources to Austro-Hungarian construction, but were willing to sell plans for up to six of the UB II boats to be constructed under license in Austria-Hungary. The Navy agreed to the proposal and purchased the plans from AG Weser of Bremen.

== Design ==
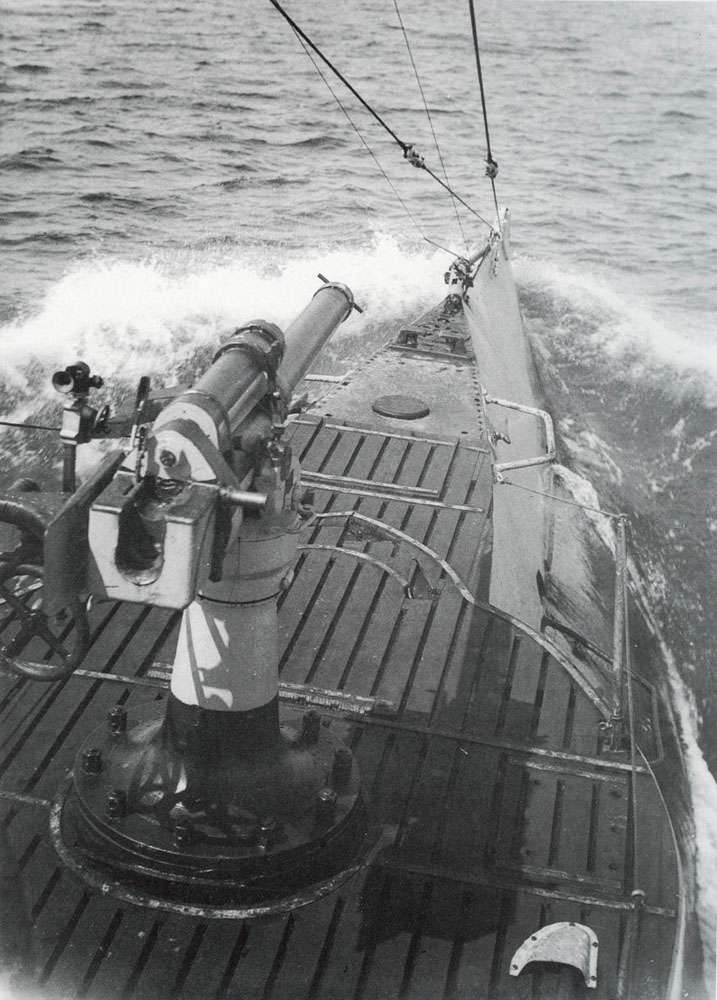
75 mm deckgun, here on board k.u.k SM U-5

The U-27-class boats were coastal submarines that displaced 264 tonnes (260 long tons) surfaced and 301 tonnes (296 long tons) submerged. The boats had a single hull with saddle tanks, and were 121 feet 1 inch (36.91 m) long with a beam of 14 feet 4 inches (4.37 m) and a draft of 12 feet 2 inches (3.71 m). For propulsion, they featured two shafts, twin diesel engines of 270 bhp (200 kW) for surface running, and twin electric motors of 280 shp (210 kW) for submerged travel. The boats were capable of 9 knots (16.7 km/h) while surfaced and 7.5 knots (13.9 km/h) while submerged. Although there is no specific notation of a range for the U-27 class, the German UB II boats, upon which the class was based, had a range of over 6,000 nautical miles at 5 knots (11,000 km at 9.3 km/h) surfaced, and 45 nautical miles (83 km) at 4 knots (7.4 km/h) submerged. The U-27 class boats were designed for a crew of 23–24.

The U-27-class boats were armed with two 45 cm (17.7 in) bow torpedo tubes and carried a complement of four torpedoes. They were also equipped with a 75 mm/26 (3.0 in) deck gun and an 8 mm (0.31 in) machine gun.

=== Differences from the Type UB II submarines ===
Although the U-27 design was based on the German Type UB II submarine, there were some differences between the two designs. (Note: The U-27 class was also similar to the Austro-Hungarian Navy's U-43-class submarines, which consisted of two former German UB II boats purchased in July 1917.) The Austro-Hungarian boats were slightly heavier than their German counterparts, by only 1 metric ton (1.1 short tons) while surfaced, but by 9 metric tons (9.9 short tons) while submerged. The UB II boats were shorter by about 3 feet (0.91 m) in length, but nearly identical in beam and draft. Both types of submarines were rated at the same 9 knots (17 km/h) on the surface, but the Austro-Hungarian boats were reported as over 1.5 knots (2.8 km/h) faster underwater even though the electric motors of the two classes had comparable power output. The German boats were more typically more heavily armed than their Austro-Hungarian cousins, and featured two larger torpedo tubes—50 cm (19.7 in) vs. 45 cm (17.7 in)—and many sported a larger deck gun—88 mm (3.5 in) vs. 75 mm (3.0 in).

== Construction ==
With the plans purchased, Austro-Hungarian Navy began the intricate political negotiations to assign the six boats—to be designated U-27 to U-32—between Austrian and Hungarian firms. (Note: The Austro-Hungarian Navy was forced to do the same Austrian/Hungarian allocations for builders and subcontractors for the four U-20-class submarines. See: Halpern, p. 382.) Of the initial order of six boats, two were allocated to the Austrian firm of Cantiere Navale Triestino (CNT) operating out of the Pola Navy Yard, (Note: By this time, the CNT shipyards at Monfalcone had been overrun by the Italian Army. See: Baumgartner and Sieche, as excerpted here (reprinted and translated into English by Sieche). Retrieved 1 December 2008.) and the balance to the Hungarian firm of Ganz Danubius in Fiume. The Navy ordered the first six boats of the class on 12 October 1915.

The first six boats were all laid down between late 1915 and early 1916. Later in 1916, the seventh boat of the class, U-40, was laid down, after having been presented to the Navy as a gift by the Österreichischen Flottenverein, and an eighth, U-41, as a replacement for U-6, which had been lost in May. The seventh and eighth boats were constructed by CNT at the Pola Navy Yard. Shortages of labor and materials plagued subcontractors and, consequently, the delivery dates for the boats were not met. However, the first six boats had all entered service by the middle of 1917.

The first of the class to be launched was U-27 on 19 October 1916, followed closely behind by U-29 three days later. The final boat launched was U-41 on 11 November 1917. The U-27 class boats were the last domestically built submarines completed for the Austro-Hungarian Navy.

== Service career ==
All the boats of the U-27 class, the most numerous of all the Austro-Hungarian submarine classes, saw active service, and all but one boat had wartime successes; U-30 sank no ships during her career, and disappeared after the end of March 1917, the only boat of the class to be lost during the war. U-41 had little success, with sinking a single ship. At the other end of the spectrum, U-27, the lead boat of the class, sank the largest number of ships, 34, and U-28 sank the greatest amount of tonnage, 44,743 GRT.

At the end of the war, U-27 and U-32 were surrendered at Pola, while U-28 and U-40 were surrendered at Venice. All four of these boats were ceded to Italy as war reparations and were scrapped by 1920. U-29, U-31, and U-41 were half of the six submarines at Cattaro, (Note: The other three submarines were U-22, U-43, and U-47. See: Gibson and Prendergast, pp. 388–89) and were all awarded to France. The boats were towed from Cattaro to Bizerta, but U-29 foundered en route; U-31, U-41, and the others were scrapped within twelve months of their arrival there.

== Class members ==
=== SM U-27 ===
U-27, the lead boat of the class, was built by the Austrian firm of Cantiere Navale Triestino (CNT) at the Pola Navy Yard and launched on 19 October 1916. She was commissioned on 24 February 1917. During the war, she sank the British destroyer Phoenix, damaged the Japanese destroyer Sakaki, and sank or captured 34 other ships totaling 14,325 GRT. U-27 was surrendered at Pola at war's end and handed over to Italy as a war reparation in 1919 and was broken up the following year. Conway's All the World's Fighting Ships 1906–1921 calls U-27 Austria-Hungary's "most successful submarine".

=== SM U-28 ===
U-28 was built by CNT at the Pola Navy Yard and launched on 8 January 1917. The boat was commissioned on 26 June 1917. Under the command of Zdenko Hudeček, U-28 sank ten ships totaling 44,743 GRT and damaged another 5,592 GRT. She was surrendered to the Italians at Venice in 1919 and scrapped in 1920.

=== SM U-29 ===
U-29 was built by the Hungarian firm of Ganz Danubius at Fiume and launched on 21 October 1916. She was commissioned on 21 January 1917, the first of the class to be commissioned. Under commander Leo Prásil, U-29 sank three British steamers (14,784 GRT) and damaged the British protected cruiser Edgar. U-29 was at Cattaro at the end of the war and awarded to France as war reparation in 1920, but foundered while under tow to Bizerta for scrapping.

=== SM U-30 ===
U-30 was built by Danubius at Fiume, launched on 27 December 1916, and commissioned on 17 February 1917. The boat, under the command of Linienschiffsleutnant Friedrich Fähndrich, sailed from Cattaro on 31 March 1917 and was never heard from again. U-30 sank no ships during her brief career.

=== SM U-31 ===
U-31 was built by Danubius at Fiume and launched on 28 March 1917. She was commissioned on 24 April 1917. In addition to damaging the British light cruiser Weymouth in October 1918, during the battle of Durazzo. U-31 sank two Italian vessels totaling 4,088 GRT. She was scrapped in Bizerta after she was awarded to France in 1920.

=== SM U-32 ===
U-32 was built by Danubius at Fiume and launched on 11 May 1917. The boat was commissioned on 29 June 1917. U-32 hit five ships of 6,788 GRT, sinking four and damaging one. At Pola at war's end, the boat was handed over to Italy and scrapped in 1920.

=== SM U-40 ===
U-40 was ordered after the funds to purchase the boat were presented by the Österreichischen Flottenverein as a gift to the Austro-Hungarian Navy. She was built by CNT at the Pola Navy Yard, launched on 21 April 1917. and commissioned on 4 August 1917. During the war, U-40 sank three ships and damaged three others, hitting a total of 23,950 GRT Commonwealth shipping. The Italian destroyer Ardea claimed to have sunk U-40 in a depth charge attack on 26 April 1918, but the boat was surrendered to Italy at Venice in 1919 and broken up.

=== SM U-41 ===
U-41 was ordered as a replacement for SM U-6 which had been sunk in May 1916. She was built by CNT at the Pola Navy Yard and launched on 11 November 1917. During construction, U-41 was lengthened about 30 centimetres (12 in) to accommodate the diesel engines on hand that were to have been installed in U-6. U-41 was commissioned on 19 February 1918, the last boat of the class, and the last Austro-Hungarian boat completed and commissioned into the Austro-Hungarian Navy. U-41 sank a single French steamer of 4,604 GRT during her short wartime career, and was at Cattaro at war's end. She was ceded to France in 1920 and towed to Bizerta, where she was scrapped within the year.

== Bibliography ==
- Baumgartner, Lothar; Erwin Sieche (1999). Die Schiffe der k.(u.)k. Kriegsmarine im Bild = Austro-Hungarian warships in photographs (in German). Wien: Verlagsbuchhandlung Stöhr. ISBN 978-3-901208-25-6. OCLC 43596931.
- Gardiner, Robert, ed. (1985). Conway's All the World's Fighting Ships 1906–1921. Annapolis, Maryland: Naval Institute Press. ISBN 978-0-87021-907-8. OCLC 12119866.
- Gibson, R. H.; Prendergast, M. (2003) [1931]. The German Submarine War, 1914–1918. Annapolis, Maryland: Naval Institute Press. ISBN 978-1-59114-314-7. OCLC 52924732.
- Halpern, Paul G. (1994). A Naval History of World War I. Annapolis, Maryland: Naval Institute Press. ISBN 978-0-87021-266-6. OCLC 28411665.
- Miller, David (2002). The Illustrated Directory of Submarines of the World. St. Paul, Minnesota: MBI Pub. Co. ISBN 978-0-7603-1345-9. OCLC 50208951.
