= SM U-31 (Austria-Hungary) =

Austro-Hungarian U-27 class submarine

History

Austria-Hungary
- Name: SM U-31
- Ordered: 12 October 1915
- Builder: Ganz Danubius, Fiume
- Laid down: 4 July 1916
- Launched: 20 March 1917
- Commissioned: 24 April 1917
- Fate: Scrapped 1920

Service record
- Commanders: Franz Nejebsy; 24 April 1917 – 2 January 1918; Hermann Rigele; 11 March – 31 October 1918
- Victories: 2 merchant ships sunk (4,088 GRT); 1 warship damaged (5,250 tons)

General characteristics
- Type: U-27-class submarine
- Displacement: 264 t (260 long tons) surfaced; 301 t (296 long tons) submerged
- Length: 121 ft 1 in (36.91 m)
- Beam: 14 ft 4 in (4.37 m)
- Draft: 12 ft 2 in (3.71 m)
- Propulsion: 2 × propeller shafts; 2 × diesel engines, 270 bhp (200 kW) total; 2 × electric motors, 280 shp (210 kW) total
- Speed: 9 knots (17 km/h) surfaced; 7.5 knots (14 km/h) submerged
- Complement: 23–24
- Armament: 2 × 45 cm (17.7 in) bow torpedo tubes; 4 torpedoes; 1 × 75 mm/26 (3.0 in) deck gun; 1 × 8 mm (.323 cal) machine gun

SM U-31 or U-XXXI was a U-27 class U-boat or submarine for the Austro-Hungarian Navy. U-31, built by the Hungarian firm of Ganz Danubius at Fiume, was launched in March 1917 and commissioned in April.

U-31 had a single hull and was just over 121 feet (37 m) in length. She displaced nearly 265 metric tons (261 long tons) when surfaced and over 300 metric tons (295 long tons) when submerged. Her two diesel engines moved her at up to 9 knots (17 km/h; 10 mph) on the surface, while her twin electric motors propelled her at up to 7.5 knots (13.9 km/h; 8.6 mph) while underwater. She was armed with two bow torpedo tubes and could carry a load of up to four torpedoes. She was also equipped with a 75 mm (3.0 in) deck gun and a machine gun.

In October 1917, U-31 sank while in port at Porto Bergudi and was out of service through April 1918 while she was raised and repaired. During her service career, U-31 sank two ships and damaged one warship, sending a combined tonnage of 4,088 to the bottom. U-31 was at Cattaro at war's end and was awarded to France as war reparation in 1920, towed to Bizerta and scrapped there.

== Design and construction ==
Austria-Hungary's U-boat fleet was largely obsolete at the outbreak of World War I. The Austro-Hungarian Navy satisfied its most urgent needs by purchasing five Type UB I submarines that comprised the U-10 class from Germany, by raising and recommissioning the sunken French submarine Curie as U-14, (Note: Curie had been caught in an anti-submarine net while trying to enter the harbor at Pola on 20 December 1914. See: Gardiner, p. 343.) and by building four submarines of the U-20 class that were based on the 1911 Danish Havmanden class. (Note: The plans for the Danish Havmanden class submarines, three of which were built in Austria-Hungary, were seized from Whitehead & Co. in Fiume. See: Gardiner, pp. 344, 354.)

After these steps alleviated their most urgent needs, the Austro-Hungarian Navy selected the German Type UB II design for its newest submarines in mid 1915. The Germans were reluctant to allocate any of their wartime resources to Austro-Hungarian construction, but were willing to sell plans for up to six of the UB II boats to be constructed under license in Austria-Hungary. The Austro-Hungarian Navy agreed to the proposal and purchased the plans from AG Weser of Bremen.

U-31 displaced 264 metric tons (260 long tons) surfaced and 301 metric tons (296 long tons) submerged. She had a single hull with saddle tanks, and was 121 feet 1 inch (36.91 m) long with a beam of 14 feet 4 inches (4.37 m) and a draft of 12 feet 2 inches (3.71 m). For propulsion, she had two shafts, twin diesel engines of 270 bhp (200 kW) for surface running, and twin electric motors of 280 shp (210 kW) for submerged travel. She was capable of 9 knots (16.7 km/h) while surfaced and 7.5 knots (13.9 km/h) while submerged. Although there is no specific notation of a range for U-31 in Conway's All the World's Fighting Ships 1906–1921, the German UB II boats, upon which the U-27 class was based, had a range of over 6,000 nautical miles (11,000 km) at 5 knots (9.3 km/h) surfaced, and 45 nautical miles (83 km) at 4 knots (7.4 km/h) submerged. U-27-class boats were designed for a crew of 23–24.

U-31 was armed with two 45 cm (17.7 in) bow torpedo tubes and could carry a complement of four torpedoes. She was also equipped with a 75 mm/26 (3.0 in) deck gun and an 8 mm (0.31 in) machine gun.

After intricate political negotiations to allocate production of the class between Austrian and Hungarian firms, U-27 was ordered from Ganz Danubius on 12 October 1915. She was laid down on 4 July 1916 at Fiume and launched on 20 March 1917.

== Service career ==
After undergoing trials at Fiume during March, U-31 made a training voyage to Brioni in April. On 24 April 1917, SM U-31 was commissioned into the Austro-Hungarian Navy under the command of Linienschiffsleutnant Franz Nejebsy. Nejebsy, a 32-year-old native of Teplitz-Schönau, Bohemia (present-day Czech Republic), had previously served two stints as commander of U-1. U-31 departed from Pola on 29 May to patrol along the Adriatic coast of Italy and returned on 5 June. U-31 departed for a patrol in the Mediterranean on 19 June. After a problem with a pump required a stop at Brioni, the U-boat continued on. Nejebsy launched a torpedo attack on an armed yacht west of Strovathi on 25 June, but the torpedoes missed their mark. U-31 ended her patrol at Cattaro after ventilation problems kept the temperature in the engine room from falling below 45 °C (113 °F).

After a month of repairs at Cattaro, U-31 headed out on another patrol on 6 August. On each of the next two days the U-boat had to crash dive to avoid bombing attacks by French airplanes, the second day's attack damaging the boat slightly. On 10 August, Nejebsy and U-31 scored their first kill with the sinking of am Italian cargo ship. The 4,021 GRT Lealta was carrying ammunition from Syracuse to Malta when U-31 intercepted her in the Ionian Sea east of Malta. An escorting destroyer dropped a pattern of ten depth charges over U-31. The following day, Nejebsy was maneuvering U-31 into position to attack a convoy when the U-boat was rammed from behind by a destroyer. U-31's periscope was hit and twisted by the impact, forcing Nejebsy to end his attack and U-31's patrol. On the way back to Cattaro, U-31 was attacked by an aircraft in the Straits of Otranto, but reached the safety of the port on 15 August.

U-31 was assigned to patrol the Austro-Hungarian and Albanian coasts over the next six weeks. She headed to Fiume via Spalato on 16 October, reaching there three days later. On 26 October U-31 sank from an unknown cause in the harbor at Porto Bergudi. When raised from her resting depth of 8 metres (26 ft) the next day, one crewman was found alive inside the boat. U-31 was taken first to the Danubius shipyard at nearby Fiume, and, later, on to Pola for repairs and trials.

In January, while U-31's repairs were still ongoing, Nejebsy was reassigned, leaving the U-boat without a commander for the next three months. On 11 March Linienschiffsleutnant Hermann Rigele was transferred from the helm of U-20 to assume command of U-31. Rigele, who had been born in Sarajevo, was 26 years old and had also been in command of U-17 and, before that, U-10 at age 25. (Note: Rigele went on to command two German U-boats in the Second World War, UD-1 and UD-3, both captured Dutch submarines. See: Helgason, Guðmundur. "WWI U-boat commanders: Hermann Rigele". German and Austrian U-boats of World War I - Kaiserliche Marine - Uboat.net.) Rigele and U-31 departed Pola on 30 April for a three-day cruise to Cattaro via Šibenik. On 20 May, the boat left Cattaro for a Mediterranean patrol, but had to turn back with leaks after a day.

In June, the Austro-Hungarian Navy planned an assault on the Otranto Barrage, similar to a May 1917 action that evolved into the Battle of Otranto Straits. U-31 was deployed from Cattaro on 9 June in advance of the attack. One of the seven separate groups participating in the attack—dreadnoughts Tegetthoff and Szent István—came under attack from Italian MAS torpedo boats in the early morning hours of 10 June. Szent István was hit and sank just after 06:00, and the entire operation was called off. U-31 returned to Cattaro on 12 June.

On 16 June, Rigele and U-31 again set out for a Mediterranean patrol, but had to immediately return with clutch problems. Two days later, the U-boat set out again for the Mediterranean. The next day, 19 June, Rigele had to take the boat to a depth of 40 metres (130 ft) to avoid a depth charge attack. On 7 July, Rigele stopped the Italian sailing vessel Giuseppino Padre and, using explosive charges, sank the 67 GRT ship. U-31 ended her patrol at Cattaro on 10 July. Over the next two months, the submarine operated in the Adriatic out of Cattaro and Pola, patrolling off Durazzo and the Albanian coast.

After the Armistice with Bulgaria on 29 September ended Bulgaria's participation in the war, Durazzo gained importance to the remaining Central Powers as the main port for supplying their forces fighting in the Balkans. Anticipating this, the Allies put together a force to bombard Durazzo. While the second echelon of the attacking force got into position to shell the town, U-31 and sister boat U-29, both patrolling off Durazzo, maneuvered to attack. Although U-29 was blocked by screening ships and experienced a heavy depth charge attack, U-31 was able to get in position to launch torpedoes at the British cruiser HMS Weymouth. One of them hit its mark and blew the stern off of Weymouth, killing four sailors in the process. The other British cruisers involved in the attack took the damaged Weymouth under tow and departed. United States Navy submarine chasers were involved in the depth charge attacks on U-29 and U-31 and erroneously claimed that they had sunk both of the submarines. U-31 was able to make her way back to Cattaro on 6 October.

Over the next three weeks, U-31 patrolled between Cattaro and Antivari, Montenegro. After her arrival back at Cattaro on 26 October, she remained there until she was awarded to France as a war reparation in 1920. U-31 was towed, along with sister boats U-29 and U-41, from Cattaro for scrapping at Bizerta. In total, U-31 sank two ships with a combined tonnage of 4,088, and damaged one warship.

== Summary of raiding history ==
Ships sunk or damaged by SM U-31
Date	Name	Nationality	Tonnage (Note: Merchant ship tonnages are in gross register tons. Military vessels are listed by tons displacement.)	Fate
10 August 1917	Lealta	Kingdom of Italy	4,021	Sunk
7 July 1918	Giuseppino Padre	Kingdom of Italy	67	Sunk
2 October 1918	HMS Weymouth	Royal Navy	5,250	Damaged
		Sunk: Damaged: Total:	4,088; 5,250; 9,338	

== Bibliography ==
- Baumgartner, Lothar; Erwin Sieche (1999). Die Schiffe der k.(u.)k. Kriegsmarine im Bild = Austro-Hungarian warships in photographs (in German). Wien: Verlagsbuchhandlung Stöhr. ISBN 978-3-901208-25-6. OCLC 43596931.
- Gardiner, Robert; Gray, Randal, eds. (1985). Conway's All the World's Fighting Ships 1906–1921. Annapolis, Maryland: Naval Institute Press. ISBN 978-0-87021-907-8. OCLC 12119866.
- Gibson, R. H.; Prendergast, Maurice (2003) [1931]. The German Submarine War, 1914–1918. Annapolis, Maryland: Naval Institute Press. ISBN 978-1-59114-314-7. OCLC 52924732.
- Halpern, Paul G. (1994). A Naval History of World War I. Annapolis, Maryland: Naval Institute Press. ISBN 978-0-87021-266-6. OCLC 28411665.
- Miller, David (2002). The Illustrated Directory of Submarines of the World. St. Paul, Minnesota: MBI Pub. Co. ISBN 978-0-7603-1345-9. OCLC 50208951.
- Tennent, A. J. (2006) [1990]. British Merchant Ships Sunk by U boats in the 1914–1918 War. Penzance: Periscope Publishing. ISBN 1-904381-36-7.
