= Havmanden-class submarine =

Havmanden-class submarine may refer to:

- Havmanden-class submarine (1911), a class of submarines built for the Royal Danish Navy from 1911 to 1914
- Havmanden-class submarine (Austria-Hungary) or U-20-class submarine, a class of submarines built for the Austro-Hungarian Navy during World War I
- Havmanden-class submarine (1938), a ship class of World War II
