= U-43-class submarine (Austria-Hungary) =

Austro-Hungarian Navy submarines during WWI

- SM U-43 in port, c. 1915–16, while still in the German Imperial Navy (as UB-43)

Class overview
- Builders: AG Weser, Bremen
- Operators: Austro-Hungarian Navy
- Preceded by: U-27-class submarine
- Succeeded by: U-48-class submarine
- Built: 1916
- In commission: 1917–1918
- Completed: 2
- Lost: 0
- Scrapped: 2
- Preserved: 0

General characteristics
- Type: submarine
- Displacement: 263 t (290 short tons) surfaced; 292 t (322 short tons) submerged
- Length: 118 ft 5 in (36.09 m)
- Beam: 14 ft 4 in (4.37 m)
- Draft: 12 ft 2 in (3.71 m)
- Propulsion: 2 × shaft; 2 × diesel engine, 284 bhp (212 kW) total; 2 × electric motor, 280 shp (210 kW) total
- Speed: 9.2 knots (17.0 km/h) surfaced; 5.8 knots (11 km/h) submerged
- Complement: 22
- Armament: 2 × 50 cm (19.7 in) bow torpedo tubes; 4 torpedoes; 1 × 88 mm/26 (3.5 in) deck gun; 1 × 8 mm (0.31 in) machine gun

The U-43 class was a class of two coastal submarines or U-boats operated by the Austro-Hungarian Navy (German: Kaiserliche und Königliche Kriegsmarine or K.u.K. Kriegsmarine) during World War I. The two submarines that comprised the class were Type UB II submarines of the Imperial German Navy, making the two classes identical. From the beginning of World War I, Austria-Hungary had been working to increase the size of its U-boat fleet, so the Imperial German Navy, which was finding it difficult to obtain trained submarine crews, sold two of its UB II boats, UB-43 and UB-47, to its ally in June 1917.

The German Type UB II design incorporated improvements over Type UB I boats, the first coastal submarines of the German Imperial Navy. Among these were twin engines and shafts for more redundancy during operations, a higher top speed, and larger torpedo tubes with double the complement of torpedoes. As a result, the UB II boats were nearly twice as heavy as their predecessor UB I boats.

Both boats of the class were selected for German service in the Mediterranean while under construction. They were shipped via rail to Pola, assembled, launched, and commissioned in the German Imperial Navy, where both enjoyed great success against Allied shipping. In June 1917, the boats were decommissioned, handed over to Austria-Hungary, and then commissioned into the Austro-Hungarian Navy in July. The B in the designation of both boats was dropped, but the submarines retained the same numbers, becoming U-43 and U-47 under the Austro-Hungarian flag. At the end of the war U-43 and U-47 were ceded to Italy and France, respectively, and had been scrapped by 1920.

== Background ==
Austria-Hungary's U-boat fleet was largely obsolete at the outbreak of World War I. The Austro-Hungarian Navy satisfied its most urgent needs by purchasing five Type UB I submarines that comprised the U-10 class from Germany, by raising and recommissioning the sunken French submarine Curie as U-14, (Note: Curie had been caught in an anti-submarine net while trying to enter the harbor at Pola on 20 December 1914. See: Gardiner, p. 343.) and by building four submarines of the U-20 class that were based on the 1911 Danish Havmanden class. (Note: The plans for the Danish Havmanden class submarines, three of which were built in Austria-Hungary, were seized from Whitehead & Co. in Fiume. See: Gardiner, pp. 344, 354.)

After these steps alleviated the most urgent needs, the Austro-Hungarian Navy had adopted the German Type UB II design for what became known as the Austro-Hungarian U-27 class in mid 1915, and had six of that class being built under license in Austria-Hungary by late 1916. (Note: A further two U-27 class boats were started in 1916. See: Halpern, p. 383.) In November 1916, Germany had inquired to find out if Austria-Hungary were interested in purchasing existing German submarines because Germany was having a hard time finding trained submarine crews. After protracted negotiations, which had stalled over the outflow of Austro-Hungarian gold reserves to Germany, an agreement to purchase two submarines—UB-43 and UB-47—was reached in June 1917.

== Design ==
=== The UB II design ===
The German UB II design of coastal submarines was a development from the design of the UB I boats, which had been originally ordered in September 1914. (Note: The Austro-Hungarian Navy's U-10-class submarines were German-built UB I boats. Two of the U-10 class had, like the two U-43 boats, been originally commissioned into the Imperial German Navy. See: Gardiner, p. 343.) During their trials, the UB I boats were found to be too small and too slow, but in-service use revealed another problem. The UB I boats had a single propeller shaft/engine combo such that if either component failed, the U-boat became almost totally disabled. The UB II boats featured twin propeller shafts and twin engines (one shaft for each engine) which not only alleviated this problem, but also had the added benefit of increasing the top speed. The new design also included more powerful batteries, larger torpedo tubes, and a deck gun. The UB II boats could also carry twice the torpedo load of their predecessors, and nearly ten times as much fuel. To contain all of these changes the hull was larger, and the surface and submerged displacement was more than doubled.

The UB II boats were ordered from three manufacturers in groups that numbered between two and twelve. Each group had slight variations in design, resulting in differences in displacements, lengths, speeds, fuel capacities, and operational ranges.

=== The U-43-class design ===
The U-43 class consisted of two boats from a contracted group of six UB II boats built by AG Weser of Bremen. (Note: The six boats were numbered sequentially from UB-42 to UB-47.) Like all of the UB II boats from different manufacturers and contract groups, the U-43 group had distinct specifications. This group displaced 272 metric tons (300 short tons) surfaced and 305 metric tons (336 short tons) submerged. The boats had a single hull with saddle tanks (an early style of ballast tanks), and were 121 feet 1 inch (36.91 m) long with a beam of 14 feet 4 inches (4.37 m) and a draft of 12 feet 2 inches (3.71 m). For propulsion, they featured two shafts, twin diesel engines of 270 bhp (200 kW) for surface running, and twin electric motors of 280 shp (210 kW) for submerged travel. The boats were capable of 8.8 knots (16.3 km/h) while surfaced and 6.2 knots (11.5 km/h) submerged. The range of the boats was 6,940 nautical miles (12,850 km) at 5 knots (9.3 km/h) surfaced, and 45 nautical miles (83 km) at 4 knots (7.4 km/h) submerged. The U-43 class boats were designed for a crew of 22.

The U-43 class boats were armed with two 50 cm (19.7 in) bow torpedo tubes and carried a complement of four torpedoes. They were each equipped with an 88 mm/26 (3.5 in) deck gun and an 8 mm (0.31 in) machine gun.

The two U-43-class U-boats were nearly identical to the eight boats of the Austro-Hungarian Navy's U-27 class, which were built to UB II plans. Despite the similarities, the two groups are identified in sources as distinct classes.

== Construction ==
The six-boat group that included UB-43 and UB-47 was ordered in July 1915, and both boats had been laid down in early September. This group was selected by the German Admiralstab for deployment to the Mediterranean, but, unlike the smaller UB I boats, they could not as easily be transported overland by rail. Weser prepared the boats for rail shipment by cutting the boat sections longitudinally, and sent all the materials, along with German shipyard workers, to Pola, where the boats were reassembled. UB-43 was launched in early April 1916, while UB-47 followed in June.

== Class members ==
=== SM U-43 ===
UB-43 was ordered by the Imperial German Navy on 31 July 1915 and was laid down by AG Weser of Bremen on 3 September. While under construction, she was one of a group of six U-boats selected for service in the Mediterranean. UB-43 was broken into railcar-sized components and shipped overland to the Austro-Hungarian port of Pola where Weser workers assembled her. She was launched on 8 April 1916 and commissioned into the Imperial German Navy as SM UB-43 on 24 April, under the command of Oberleutnant zur See Dietrich Niebuhr. Kapitänleutnant Hans von Mellenthin was assigned to the boat in late August 1916, and led the boat in sinking 19 ships (86,236 GRT) over the next 8½ months. In April 1917, von Mellenthin was replaced by Oberleutnant zur See Horst Obermüller who commanded the ship for the next three months, sinking three more ships (12,940 GRT) and damaging the British cruiser Grafton. UB-43 was decommissioned on 15 July and taken over by the Austro-Hungarian Navy.

Renamed U-43 for Austro-Hungarian service, the boat became the class leader of the U-43 boats when she was commissioned into the Austro-Hungarian Navy on 30 July 1917. The submarine's successes while under German command were not matched under Austro-Hungarian; she damaged a single ship in November 1917 in her only successful attack. U-47 was surrendered to France as a war reparation in 1920 and was broken up at Bizerta.

=== SM U-47 ===
UB-47 was ordered by the Imperial German Navy on 31 July 1915 and was laid down at Bremen by AG Weser on 4 September. As one of six U-boats selected for service in the Mediterranean while under construction, she was broken into railcar-sized components and shipped overland to the Austro-Hungarian port of Pola. Shipyard workers from Weser assembled the boat and her five sisters at Pola, where she was launched on 17 June.

SM UB-47 was commissioned into the Imperial German Navy on 4 July 1916 under the command of Oberleutnant zur See Wolfgang Steinbauer. Steinbauer and UB-47 sank 15 ships (62,676 GRT and 11,100 tons) over the next nine months, including two Cunard Line steamers—Franconia and Ivernia—serving as British troopships, as well as the French battleship Gaulois. Steinbauer also damaged three ships with a combined gross register tonnage of 16,967. Under the command of Hans Hermann Wendlandt, who had replaced Steinbauer in April 1917, UB-47 sank an additional seven ships (13,519 GRT and 350 tons) through 21 July, at which time the ship was decommissioned and handed over to the Austro-Hungarian Navy.

The B in her designation was dropped when she was commissioned as SM U-47 for the Austro-Hungarian Navy on 30 July 1917. U-47's success under Austro-Hungarian command was less than that under the German flag; only three ships (6,201 GRT and 351 tons) were sunk through the end of the war. U-47 was surrendered to France as a war reparation in 1920 and was broken up at Bizerta.

== Bibliography ==
- Baumgartner, Lothar; Erwin Sieche (1999). Die Schiffe der k.(u.)k. Kriegsmarine im Bild = Austro-Hungarian warships in photographs (in German). Wien: Verlagsbuchhandlung Stöhr. ISBN 978-3-901208-25-6. OCLC 43596931.
- Gardiner, Robert, ed. (1985). Conway's All the World's Fighting Ships 1906–1921. Annapolis, Maryland: Naval Institute Press. ISBN 978-0-87021-907-8. OCLC 12119866.
- Gibson, R. H.; Prendergast, M. (2003) [1931]. The German Submarine War, 1914–1918. Annapolis, Maryland: Naval Institute Press. ISBN 978-1-59114-314-7. OCLC 52924732.
- Halpern, Paul G. (1994). A Naval History of World War I. Annapolis, Maryland: Naval Institute Press. ISBN 978-0-87021-266-6. OCLC 28411665.
- Miller, David (2002). The Illustrated Directory of Submarines of the World. St. Paul, Minnesota: MBI Pub. Co. ISBN 978-0-7603-1345-9. OCLC 50208951.
- Tarrant, V. E. (1989). The U-Boat Offensive: 1914–1945. Annapolis, Maryland: Naval Institute Press. ISBN 978-0-87021-764-7. OCLC 20338385.
- Williamson, Gordon (2002). U-boats of the Kaiser's Navy. Oxford: Osprey. ISBN 978-1-84176-362-0. OCLC 48627495.
