= U-43-class submarine =

U-43 class submarine may refer to:

- U-43-class submarine (Austria-Hungary), a class of two former German Type UB II coastal submarines sold to the Austro-Hungarian Navy during World War I
- U-43-class submarine (Germany), a class of eight ocean-going submarines built at the Imperial Dockyard at Danzig during World War I
