= CANT 11 =

1920s Italian seaplane

General information
- Type: Racer
- National origin: Italy
- Manufacturer: Cantieri Navale Triestino (CNT)
- Designer: Alessandro Guidoni

The CANT 11 was a single-engine biplane seaplane built by the Italian shipyard Cantiere Navale Triestino (CNT) in the early 1920s. It was intended for participation in the 1924 Schneider Cup.
