= French destroyer Renaudin =

Destroyer of the French Navy

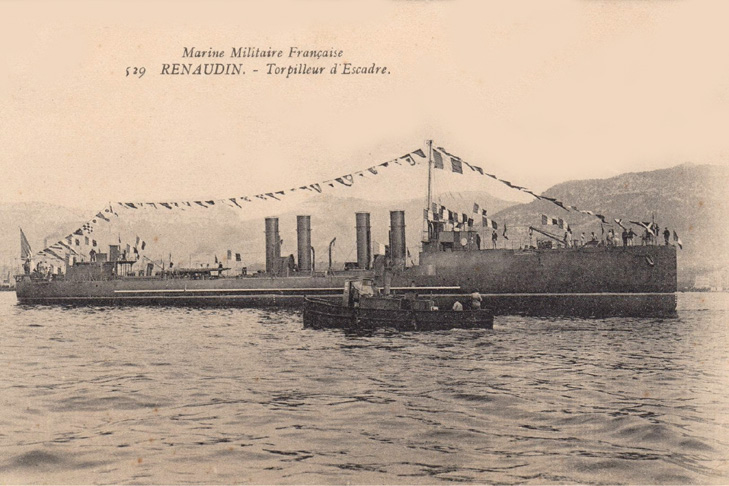
- Renaudin at anchor

History

France
- Name: Renaudin
- Ordered: 23 November 1910
- Builder: Arsenal de Toulon
- Laid down: 1 February 1911
- Launched: 20 March 1913
- Commissioned: 1 January 1914
- Fate: Sunk, 18 March 1916

General characteristics
- Class & type: Bisson-class destroyer
- Displacement: 800 t (787 long tons) (normal)
- Length: 78.1 m (256 ft 3 in)
- Beam: 7.96 m (26 ft 1 in)
- Draft: 2.94 m (9 ft 8 in)
- Installed power: 4 Guyot-du Temple boilers; 15,000 shp (11,185 kW)
- Propulsion: 2 shafts; 2 steam turbines
- Speed: 30 knots (56 km/h; 35 mph)
- Range: 1,950 nmi (3,610 km; 2,240 mi) at 14 knots (26 km/h; 16 mph)
- Complement: 4 officers, 77–84 crewmen
- Armament: 2 × single 100 mm (3.9 in) guns; 4 × single 65 mm (2.6 in) guns; 2 × twin 450 mm (17.7 in) torpedo tubes

Renaudin was one of six Bisson-class destroyers built for the French Navy during the early 1910s. Completed in 1913, the ship was assigned to the 1st Naval Army (1^{ère} Armée Navale) in the Mediterranean Sea. During the First World War, she escorted the battle fleet during the Battle of Antivari in August 1914 and escorted multiple convoys to Montenegro for the rest of the year. Renaudin helped to sink a crippled Austro-Hungarian destroyer during the 1st Battle of Durazzo in late 1915 and protected the evacuation of the Royal Serbian Army from Durazzo, Albania, in February 1916. The ship was sunk by an Austro-Hungarian submarine the following month with the loss of 50 crewmen.

== Design and description ==
The Bisson class were slightly enlarged versions of the preceding Bouclier class. The ships had an overall length of 78.1 meters (256 ft 3 in), a beam of 7.96 meters (26 ft 1 in), and a draft of 2.94 meters (9 ft 8 in). They displaced 800 metric tons (787 long tons) at normal load. Their crew numbered 4 officers and 77–84 men.

Renaudin was powered by a pair of Breguet steam turbines, each driving one propeller shaft using steam provided by four Guyot-du Temple water-tube boilers. The engines were designed to produce 15,000 shaft horsepower (11,000 kW) which was intended to give the ships a speed of 30 knots (56 km/h; 35 mph). During her sea trials, Renaudin reached a speed of 30.55 knots (56.58 km/h; 35.16 mph). The ships carried enough fuel oil to give them a range of 1,950 nautical miles (3,610 km; 2,240 mi) at a cruising speed of 14 knots (26 km/h; 16 mph).

The primary armament of the Bisson-class ships consisted of two 100-millimeter (3.9 in) Modèle 1893 guns in single mounts, one each fore and aft of the superstructure, and four 65-millimeter (2.6 in) Modèle 1902 guns distributed amidships. They were also fitted with two twin mounts for 450-millimeter (17.7 in) torpedo tubes amidships, one on each broadside.

== Construction and career ==
Renaudin was ordered on 23 November 1910 as part of the 1910 naval program from the Arsenal de Toulon and was laid down on 1 February 1911. She was launched on 20 March 1913 and began her sea trials on 10 July. The ship was commissioned on 1 January 1914 and was assigned to the 6th Destroyer Flotilla (6^{e} escadrille de torpilleurs d'escadre) of the 1st Naval Army in the Mediterranean. (Note: Prévoteaux lists Renaudin as under repair on 1 August. Exactly when those were completed and the ship entered active service is unknown.) During the preliminary stages of the Battle of Antivari, Montenegro, on 16 August, the 1st, 4th and 5th Destroyer Flotillas were tasked to escort the core of the 1st Naval Army while the 2nd, 3rd and 6th Flotillas escorted the armored cruisers of the 2nd Light Squadron (2^{e} escadre légère) and two British cruisers. After reuniting both groups and spotting the Austro-Hungarian protected cruiser SMS Zenta and the destroyer SMS Ulan, the French destroyers played no role in sinking the cruiser, although the 4th Flotilla was sent on an unsuccessful pursuit of Ulan. Having broken the Austro-Hungarian blockade of Antivari (now known as Bar), Vice-Admiral (Vice-amiral) Augustin Boué de Lapeyrère, commander of the 1st Naval Army, decided to ferry troops and supplies to the port using a small requisitioned passenger ship, SS Liamone, escorted by the 2nd Light Squadron, reinforced by the armored cruiser Ernest Renan, and escorted by the destroyer Bouclier with the 1st and 6th Destroyer Flotillas under command while the rest of the 1st Naval Army bombarded the Austro-Hungarian naval base at Cattaro, Montenegro, on 1 September. Four days later, the fleet covered the evacuation of Danilo, Crown Prince of Montenegro, aboard Bouclier, to the Greek island of Corfu. The flotilla escorted multiple small convoys loaded with supplies and equipment to Antivari, beginning in October and lasting for the rest of the year, always covered by the larger ships of the Naval Army in futile attempts to lure the Austro-Hungarian fleet into battle. Amidst these missions, the 1st and 6th Flotillas were led by the French destroyer Dehorter as they conducted a sweep south of Cattaro on the night of 10/11 November in an unsuccessful search for Austro-Hungarian destroyers.

After Italy signed the Treaty of London and declared war on the Austro-Hungarian Empire on 23 May, the ship was transferred to the 1st Destroyer Flotilla (1^{ère} escadrille de torpilleurs de escadre) in December which was assigned to the 1st Division of Destroyers and Submarines (1^{ère} division de torpilleurs et de sous-marines) of the 2nd Squadron (escadre) based at Brindisi, Italy. According to a British report of 5 June, Renaudin and the cruisers Guichen and Châteaurenault were assigned to patrol the area between Sicily and Cape Bon, Tunisia.

Several months later, Captain A. P. Addison's force (the British light cruiser HMS Dartmouth, the Italian scout cruiser Quarto and the 1st Destroyer Flotilla) was alerted by a report of an Austro-Hungarian cruiser and five destroyers off Durazzo, shortly before 0700 on 29 December and sortied at 0715 in an attempt to cut off the Austro-Hungarian ships from their base at Cattaro. While attacking the ships in the harbor, the Tátra-class destroyers had blundered into a minefield which sank one ship and crippled SMS Triglav. Another destroyer began towing the cripple and the Austro-Hungarians turned north at 6 knots (11 km/h; 6.9 mph).

Initially unaware of the losses suffered by the Austro-Hungarians, Addison had sailed directly for Cattaro, but when he was informed of the losses, he turned south, searching for the Austro-Hungarians. Smoke on the southern horizon was spotted at 1320, although Addison's ships had been seen five minutes earlier by the Austro-Hungarians; the tow had been dropped and Triglav abandoned. At 1338 Addison detached his destroyers to deal with Triglav which still had smoke coming from its funnels. The flotilla commander aboard Casque thought that the Austro-Hungarian ship was still underway and decided to engage it with gunfire rather than torpedoing it. The time required to sink Triglav was longer than expected and left the flotilla unable to rejoin the pursuit despite following Addison's cruisers at full speed.

The flotilla covered the evacuation of the Royal Serbian Army from Durazzo on 23–26 February 1916. Renaudin and Commandant Bory were one of three pairs of Allied destroyers patrolling the Montenegrin and Albanian coasts on 18 March when they were attacked off Durazzo (41°17′N 19°22′E) by the Austro-Hungarian submarine SM U-6. One torpedo struck Renaudin, breaking her in half, and another missed Commandant Bory. The latter ship was able to rescue 30 survivors from Renaudin's crew of 80 after the submarine disengaged.

== Bibliography ==
- Cernuschi, Enrico & O'Hara, Vincent (2015). "The Naval War in the Adriatic Part 1: 1914–1916". In Jordan, John (ed.). Warship 2015. London: Conway. pp. 161–173. ISBN 978-1-84486-276-4.
- Couhat, Jean Labayle (1974). French Warships of World War I. London: Ian Allan. ISBN 0-7110-0445-5.
- Freivogel, Zvonimir (2019). The Great War in the Adriatic Sea 1914–1918. Zagreb: Despot Infinitus. ISBN 978-953-8218-40-8.
- Monograph No. 21: The Mediterranean 1914–1915 (PDF). Naval Staff Monographs (Historical). Vol. VIII. The Naval Staff, Training and Staff Duties Division. 1923.
- O'Hara, Vincent P. & Heinz, Leonard R. (2017). Clash of Fleets: Naval Battles of the Great War, 1914-18. Annapolis, Maryland: Naval Institute Press. ISBN 978-1-68247-008-4.
- Prévoteaux, Gérard (2017). La marine française dans la Grande guerre: les combattants oubliés: Tome I 1914–1915 [The French Navy during the Great War: The Forgotten Combatants, Book I 1914–1915]. Collection Navires & Histoire des Marines du Mond. Vol. 23. Le Vigen, France: Éditions Lela presse. ISBN 978-2-37468-000-2.
- Prévoteaux, Gérard (2017). La marine française dans la Grande guerre: les combattants oubliés: Tome II 1916–1918 [The French Navy during the Great War: The Forgotten Combatants, Book II 1916–1918]. Collection Navires & Histoire des Marines du Mond. Vol. 27. Le Vigen, France: Éditions Lela presse. ISBN 978-2-37468-001-9.
- Roberts, Stephen S. (2021). French Warships in the Age of Steam 1859–1914: Design, Construction, Careers and Fates. Barnsley, UK: Seaforth Publishing. ISBN 978-1-5267-4533-0.
- Smigielski, Adam (1985). "France". In Gray, Randal (ed.). Conway's All the World's Fighting Ships 1906–1921. Annapolis, Maryland: Naval Institute Press. pp. 190–220. ISBN 0-87021-907-3.
