= SM U-6 (Austria-Hungary) =

Austro-Hungarian U-5-class submarine

- U-6, as seen in a pre-war postcard

History

Austria-Hungary
- Name: SM U-6
- Ordered: 1906
- Builder: Whitehead & Co., Fiume
- Laid down: 21 February 1908
- Launched: 12 June 1909
- Commissioned: 1 July 1910
- Fate: Trapped in anti-submarine net and scuttled, 13 May 1916

Service record
- Commanders: Georg Ritter von Trapp; 1 July 1910 – 24 June 1913; Nikolaus Halavanja; 24 June 1913 – 22 July 1915; Albrecht Graf von Attems; 22 July – 5 August 1915; Urban Passerar; 5 – 31 August 1915; Lüdwig Eberhardt; 31 August – 10 October 1915; Nikolaus Halavanja; 10 October – 21 November 1915; Hugo von Falkhausen; 21 November 1915 – 13 May 1916
- Victories: 1 warship sunk (756 tons)

General characteristics
- Class & type: U-5-class submarine
- Displacement: 240 t surfaced; 273 t submerged
- Length: 105 ft 4 in (32.11 m)
- Beam: 13 ft 9 in (4.19 m)
- Draft: 12 ft 10 in (3.91 m)
- Propulsion: 2 × shafts; 2 × 6-cylinder gasoline engines, 500 bhp (370 kW) total; 2 × electric motors, 230 shp (170 kW) total
- Speed: 10.75 knots (19.91 km/h) surfaced; 8.5 knots (15.7 km/h) submerged
- Range: 800 nmi (1,500 km) at 8.5 knots (15.7 km/h) surfaced; 48 nmi (89 km) at 6 knots (11.1 km/h) submerged
- Complement: 19
- Armament: 2 × 45 cm (17.7 in) torpedo tubes (both in front); 4 torpedoes

SM U-6 or U-VI was a U-5-class submarine or U-boat built for and operated by the Austro-Hungarian Navy (German: Kaiserliche und Königliche Kriegsmarine or K.u.K. Kriegsmarine) before and during the First World War. The submarine was built as part of a plan to evaluate foreign submarine designs, and was the second of three boats of the class built by Whitehead & Co. of Fiume after a design by Irishman John Philip Holland.

U-6 was laid down in February 1908 and launched in June 1909. The double-hulled submarine was just over 105 feet (32 m) long and displaced between 240 and 273 tonnes (265 and 301 short tons), depending on whether surfaced or submerged. U-6's design had inadequate ventilation and exhaust from her twin gasoline engines often intoxicated the crew. The boat was commissioned into the Austro-Hungarian Navy in July 1910, and served as a training boat—sometimes making as many as ten cruises a month—through the beginning of the First World War in 1914.

The submarine had only one wartime success, which was sinking a French destroyer in March 1916. Later that year, in May, U-6 became entangled in anti-submarine netting deployed as part of the Otranto Barrage. Coming under fire from Royal Navy's drifters running the nets, U-6 was abandoned and sunk. All of her crewmen were rescued and were held in captivity through the end of the war.

== Design and construction ==
U-6 was built as part of a plan by the Austro-Hungarian Navy to competitively evaluate foreign submarine designs from Simon Lake, Germaniawerft, and John Philip Holland. The Austro-Hungarian Navy authorized the construction of U-6 (and sister ship, U-5) in 1906 by Whitehead & Co. of Fiume. The boat was designed by American John Philip Holland and licensed by Holland and his company, Electric Boat. U-6 was laid down on 21 February 1908 in the United States, partially assembled, and shipped to Whitehead's for final assembly, a process which, author Edwin Sieche notes, "caused a lot of trouble". She was launched at Fiume on 12 June 1909.

U-6's design featured a single-hull with a tear-drop shaped body that bore a strong resemblance to modern nuclear submarines. She was 105 feet 4 inches (32.11 m) long by 13 feet 9 inches (4.19 m) abeam and had a draft of 12 feet 10 inches (3.91 m). She displaced 240 tonnes (240 long tons) surfaced, and 273 tonnes (269 long tons) submerged. Her two 45-centimeter (17.7 in) bow torpedo tubes featured unique, cloverleaf-shaped design hatches that rotated on a central axis, and the boat was designed to carry up to four torpedoes. For surface running, U-6 was outfitted with 2 gasoline engines, but suffered from inadequate ventilation, which resulted in frequent intoxication of the crew; her underwater propulsion was by two electric motors. (Note: U-6's gasoline engines were slated to be replaced by diesel engines, but this was not accomplished before the boat sank in May 1916. The two engines ordered for U-6, were instead installed in U-41 which had to be lengthened to accommodate them. See: Baumgartner and Sieche, as excerpted here (reprinted and translated into English by Sieche). Retrieved 26 November 2008.)

== Service career ==
U-6 was commissioned into the Austro-Hungarian Navy on 1 July 1910, with Linienschiffsleutnant Georg Ritter von Trapp in command. Over the next three years she served primarily as a training boat, making as many as ten training cruises per month. On 7 November 1911, she hosted a Norwegian naval delegation that inspected her. On 26 June 1912, U-6 was accidentally rammed by the submarine tender Pelikan while surfacing after a deep diving trial.

At the outbreak of World War I, U-6 was one of only four fully operational U-boats in the Austro-Hungarian Navy fleet, and was stationed at Cattaro by late 1914. U-6's activities over the early part of the war are not reported, but the boat's armament was augmented by a 3.7 cm/23 (1.5 in) quick-firing (QF) deck gun in December 1915. Sister boat U-5 had her first radio receiver installed at the same time her deck gun was added, but it is not reported whether U-6 did, too. On 23 February 1916, U-6 made an unsuccessful attack on an Italian Indomito-class destroyer, but she then managed to torpedo and sink the French destroyer Renaudin on 18 March off Durazzo. Renaudin went down with 47 of her 83-man complement.

On the night of 12 May, U-6 headed out to try to intercept shipping between Santa Maria di Leuca and Valona. Linienschiffsleutnant Hugo von Falkhausen, U-6's commander since November 1915, attempted to pass underneath two drifters that formed a part of the Otranto Barrage. While submerged, von Falkhausen heard an unexplained noise on the hull of the boat, which was likely the sound of U-6 fouling one of the anti-submarine nets deployed from the drifter Calistoga. The drifter's skipper was alerted to the submarine's presence when one of the indicator buoys had fired. Calistoga launched signal flares that attracted the attention of two nearby drifters Dulcie Doris and Evening Star II. In the meantime, von Falkhausen surfaced U-6 to try to cut loose the buoy being dragged behind his boat. When the hatch was opened, the crew discovered the boat entangled in the net.

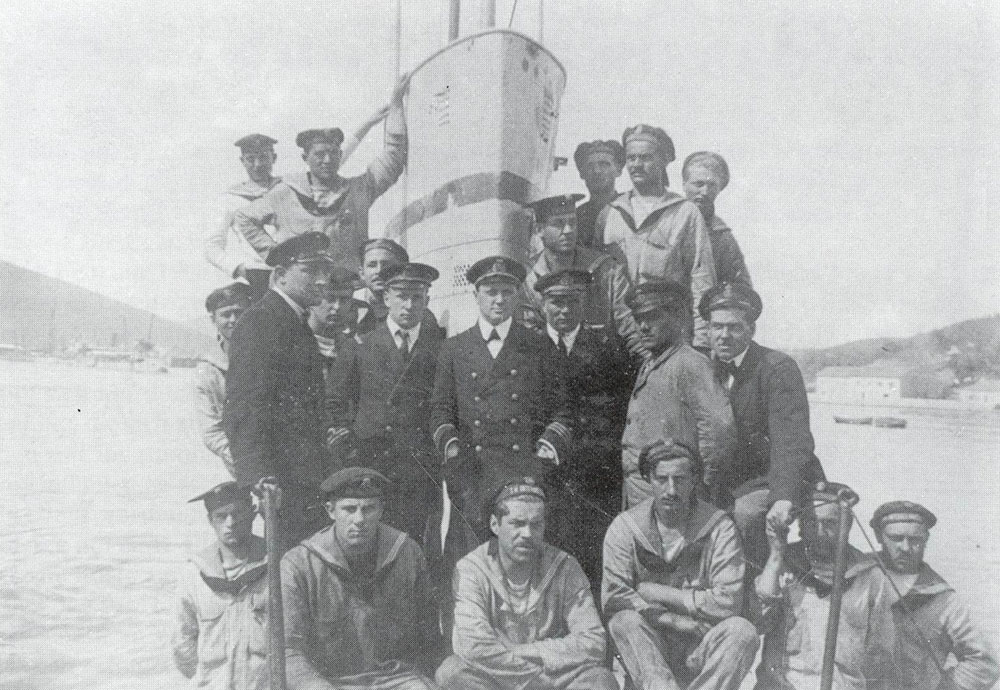
The successful crew after the sinking of Destroyer Renaudin

Though unable to submerge, von Falkhausen attempted to flee on the surface, but the port propeller shaft became fouled. Realizing that he was stuck, and with Dulcie Doris and Evening Star II beginning to shell his boat, U-6's captain ordered code books and confidential material thrown overboard and the submarine scuttled. U-6's three officers and seventeen crewmen were all rescued, but spent the remainder of the war as prisoners of the Italians. In her career, U-6 sank one ship totaling 756 tons.

== Summary of raiding history ==
Date	Name	Nationality	Tonnage	Fate
18 March 1916	Renaudin	French Navy	756	Sunk

== Bibliography ==
- Baumgartner, Lothar; Erwin Sieche (1999). Die Schiffe der k.(u.)k. Kriegsmarine im Bild [Austro-Hungarian Warships in Photographs] (in German). Wien: Verlagsbuchhandlung Stöhr. ISBN 978-3-901208-25-6. OCLC 43596931.
- Gardiner, Robert; Gray, Randal, eds. (1985). Conway's All the World's Fighting Ships 1906–1921. Annapolis, Maryland: Naval Institute Press. ISBN 978-0-87021-907-8. OCLC 12119866.
- Gibson, R. H.; Prendergast, Maurice (2003) [1931]. The German Submarine War, 1914–1918. Annapolis, Maryland: Naval Institute Press. ISBN 978-1-59114-314-7. OCLC 52924732.
- Halpern, Paul G. (2004). The Battle of the Otranto Straits: Controlling the Gateway to the Adriatic in World War I. Bloomington: Indiana University Press. ISBN 978-0-253-34379-6. OCLC 53896534.
- Rider, Fremont, ed. (1917). Information Annual 1916: A Continuous Cyclopedia and Digest of Current Events. New York: Cumulative Digest Corporation. OCLC 67878688.
- Sieche, Erwin F. (1980). "Austro-Hungarian Submarines". Warship, Volume 2. Naval Institute Press. ISBN 978-0-87021-976-4. OCLC 233144055.
