= Brgulje =

Settlement in Zadar County, Croatia

- Settlement
- Interactive map of Brgulje
- Location of Brgulje in Croatia
- Coordinates: 44°13′32″N 14°51′08″E
- Country: Croatia
- County: Zadar County
- City: Zadar

Area
  - Total: 5.9 km^{2} (2.3 sq mi)

Population (2021)
  - Total: 63
  - Density: 11/km^{2} (28/sq mi)
- Time zone: UTC+1 (CET)
  - Summer (DST): UTC+2 (CEST)
- Postal code: 23292 Molat
- Area code: +385 (0)23

Brgulje is a settlement in the City of Zadar in Croatia. In 2021, its population was 63.

== Demographics ==
Brgulje: Population trends 1857–2021
v

| population | 140 | | 154 | 167 | 170 | 176 | 176 | 231 | 252 | 247 | 202 | 132 | 76 | 56 | 53 | 48 | 63 |
| | 1857 | 1869 | 1880 | 1890 | 1900 | 1910 | 1921 | 1931 | 1948 | 1953 | 1961 | 1971 | 1981 | 1991 | 2001 | 2011 | 2021 |

Sources: Croatian Bureau of Statistics publications

== Bibliography ==
- Modrić, Oliver (2025-01-27). "Prijenos i zbrinjavanje gradiva župnih arhiva u Arhiv Zadarske nadbiskupije" [Transfer and storage of materials of the parish archives to the Archives of the Archdiocese of Zadar]. Vjesnik dalmatinskih arhiva (in Serbo-Croatian). 5: 109–124. doi:10.58565/vda.5.1.5. eISSN 2806-8459.
