= Cantiere Navale Triestino =

- Industry: Naval and commercial shipbuilding
- Founded: 1908
- Defunct: merged 1929
- Headquarters: Monfalcone, Austria-Hungary (later Italy)
- Services: Ship repair

Cantiere Navale Triestino – abbreviated CNT, or in English Trieste Naval Shipyard – was a private shipbuilding company based at Monfalcone operating in the early 20th century. The yard still functions today, though under a different name.

== History ==
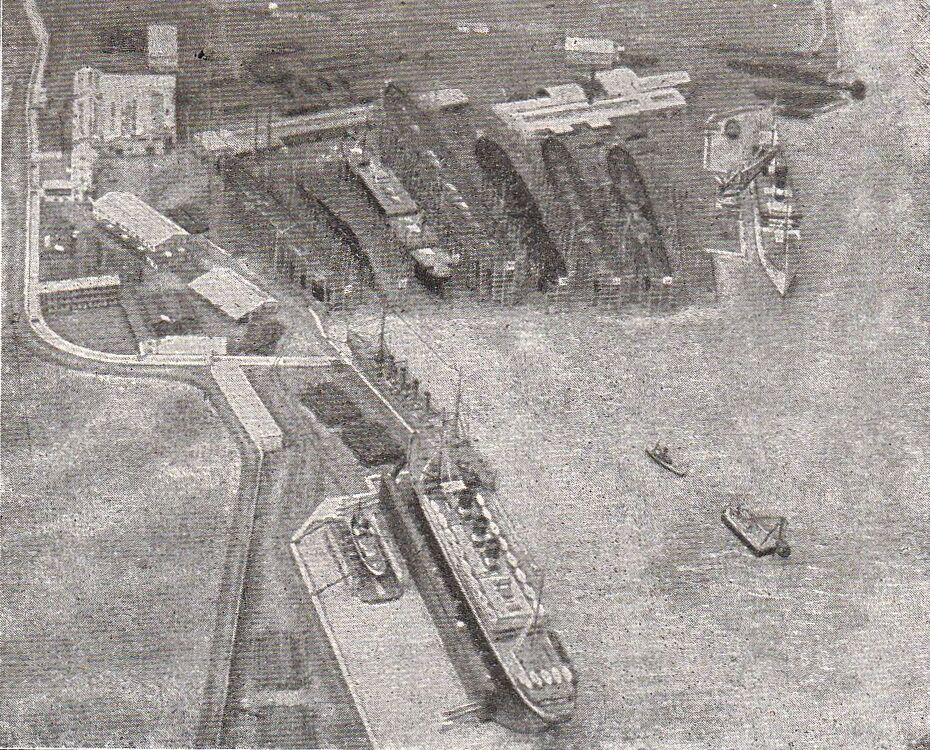
View of the shipyard (c. 1914)

Cantiere Navale Triestino was founded in 1908 by the Cosulich family. The company was largely Italian, though the site, at Monfalcone, was in what was then the Austro-Hungarian Empire. Up to the outbreak of the First World War CNT had built several ships, both merchant such as Belvedere and Erny, and naval such as the cruiser Saida for the Austro-Hungarian Navy (KuK). At the outbreak of war between Italy and Austria in 1915, the largely Italian workforce abandoned the shipyard, and the site itself was too close to the front line to continue to operate. It was occupied by the Italian Army on 8 June 1915 and was under fire from the Austrians from July to September 1915 during the Battle of the Isonzo. The company continued to operate, using facilities loaned by DDSG at Budapest and the Naval Arsenal at Pola. During the war CNT built submarines for the KuK, including several of the U-27 class of U-Boats.

After World War I, the Trieste region was ceded to Italy and the firm built naval and commercial vessels for its new host country. In 1923 the company branched out into aviation, leading to the formation of the CANT aircraft company. In 1929 CNT was merged with another Italian shipbuilding firm, Stabilimento Tecnico Triestino to form Cantieri Riuniti dell' Adriatico (CRDA). As CRDA Monfalcone the company specialized in submarines, building 47 of Italy's 100 pre-war submarine fleet.

CRDA Monfalcone's shipyards remained active well into the postwar period, becoming part of the Fincantieri group in 1984.
