= U-20-class submarine =

Austro-Hungarian Navy submarines during WWI

- SM U-21 loads a torpedo during World War I.

Class overview
- Builders: Pola Navy Yard, Pola (2); Hungarian UBAG yard, Fiume (2)
- Operators: Austro-Hungarian Navy
- Preceded by: SM U-14
- Succeeded by: U-27 class
- Built: 1915–1917
- In commission: 1916–1918
- Completed: 4
- Lost: 2
- Preserved: 0

General characteristics
- Type: submarine
- Displacement: 173 tonnes (191 short tons) surfaced; 210 tonnes (231 short tons) submerged
- Length: 127 ft 2 in (38.76 m)
- Beam: 13 ft (4.0 m)
- Draft: 9 ft (2.7 m)
- Propulsion: 1 × shaft; 1 × diesel engine, 450 bhp (340 kW); 1 × electric motor, 160 shp (120 kW)
- Speed: 12 knots (22 km/h) surfaced; 9 knots (17 km/h) submerged
- Range: 1,400 nautical miles (2,600 km) at 10 knots (19 km/h) surfaced; 23 nautical miles (43 km) at 8 knots (15 km/h) submerged
- Complement: 18
- Armament: 2 × 45 cm (17.7 in) torpedo tubes (both in front); 2 torpedoes; 1 × 66 mm/26 (2.6 in) deck gun; 1 × 8 mm (0.31 in) machine gun

The U-20 class was a class of four submarines or U-boats built for and operated by the Austro-Hungarian Navy (German: Kaiserliche und Königliche Kriegsmarine or K.u.K. Kriegsmarine) during World War I. The class is sometimes referred to as the Havmanden class because it was based upon the design of the Royal Danish Navy's 1911 Havmanden-class submarines, three of which were built in Fiume.

With a small fleet of six U-boats at the beginning of World War I, two of which were not operational, the Austro-Hungarian Navy acted to bolster its fleet. They reluctantly ordered four U-20 boats in 1915 because construction could start immediately, even though the Havmanden-class design was largely obsolete by the beginning of the war. Political considerations caused the order to be split between Austrian and Hungarian firms, which contributed to construction problems and delays, keeping any of the boats from being operational until the middle of 1917.

The class boats were just over 127 feet (39 m) long and were armed with two front torpedo tubes, a deck gun, and a machine gun. The engines for the boats were unreliable, which compounded handling problems with the design. The U-20 class did not claim any wartime successes, yet lost two of the boats—U-20 and U-23—to enemy action during the war. The remaining two were delivered as war reparations and broken up. The conning tower from U-20, which was raised and salvaged in 1962, is on display in a military museum in Vienna.

== Background ==
The Austro-Hungarian Navy's U-boat fleet at the beginning of World War I consisted of six largely experimental submarines, two of which were not operational. (Note: U-1 and U-2 were in drydock awaiting diesel engines to replace their inadequate gasoline engines. See: Gardiner, pp. 340–41.) When it became apparent that the war would not be a short one, Austria-Hungary moved to bolster their U-boat fleet by seizing the plans for the Danish Havmanden-class submarines, three of which had been built at Whitehead's in Fiume. Although the Austro-Hungarian Navy was not happy with the design, which was largely obsolete, it was the only design for which plans were available and which could be begun immediately in domestic shipyards. The Austro-Hungarian Navy unenthusiastically placed orders for four boats on 27 March 1915.

== Design and construction ==
Before construction could begin, the Navy found itself in the midst of political situation because the Hungarian government demanded that a substantial portion of the submarine contracts be allocated to Hungarian firms. After intricate negotiations, the order was split into two orders of two submarines each, with U-20 and U-21 built at the Pola Navy Yard, and U-22 and U-23 built at the Hungarian UBAG yard at Fiume. The subcontracts were also divided between Hungarian and Austrian firms, with about two-thirds going to Hungarian companies and one-third to Austrian companies. This allocation of contracts, while politically expedient, exacerbated technical problems that resulted in numerous modifications and delays.

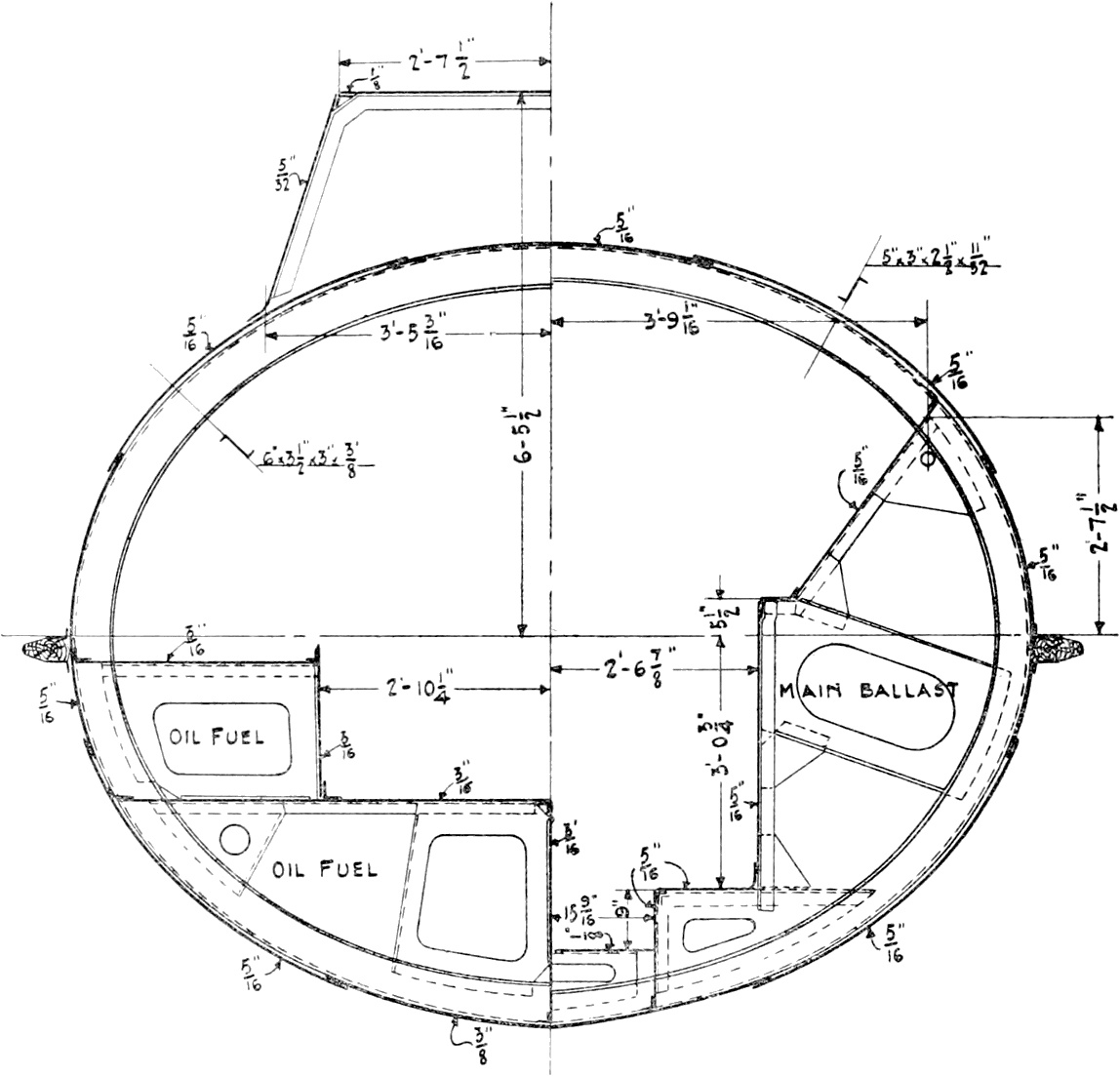
A cross section of the Danish submarine Havmanden, the lead ship of the class upon which the U-20 class was based.

The U-20-class boats were ocean-going submarines that displaced 173 tonnes (191 short tons) surfaced and 210 tonnes (231 short tons) submerged. The boats were 127 feet 2 inches (38.76 m) long with a beam of 13 feet (4.0 m) and a draft of 9 feet (2.7 m). For propulsion, they featured a single shaft, a single 450 bhp (340 kW) diesel engine for surface running, and a single 160 shp (120 kW) electric motor for submerged travel. The boats were capable of 12 knots (22 km/h) while surfaced and 9 knots (17 km/h) while submerged. Although there is no specific notation of a range for the U-20 class, the Havmanden class, upon which it was based, had a range of 1,400 nautical miles (2,600 km) at 10 knots (19 km/h), surfaced, and 23 nautical miles (43 km) at 8 knots (15 km/h) submerged. The U-20-class boats were designed for a crew of 18.

The U-20-class boats were armed with two 45 cm (17.7 in) torpedo tubes located in the front and carried a complement of two torpedoes. They were also equipped with a 66 mm/26 (2.6 in) deck gun and an 8 mm (0.31 in) machine gun. The first of the class to be launched was U-21, when it slid down the ways on 15 August 1916; the final boat launched was U-22 on 27 January 1917. The boats entered service between August and November 1917.

== Class members ==
During their active service, the boats of the U-20 class suffered from unreliable engines which compounded the already poor handling characteristics of the boats. None of the class had any successes and two of their number were sunk during the war. U-23 was the first sunk when she went down on 21 February 1918 from an explosive paravane in the Straits of Otranto. U-20, the lead boat of the class, sank in July 1918 when she was torpedoed by the Italian submarine F12 in the Tagliamento estuary. The remaining two boats were surrendered at war's end, with U-21 being ceded to Italy in 1920, and U-22 to France; both were broken up.

=== SM U-20 ===
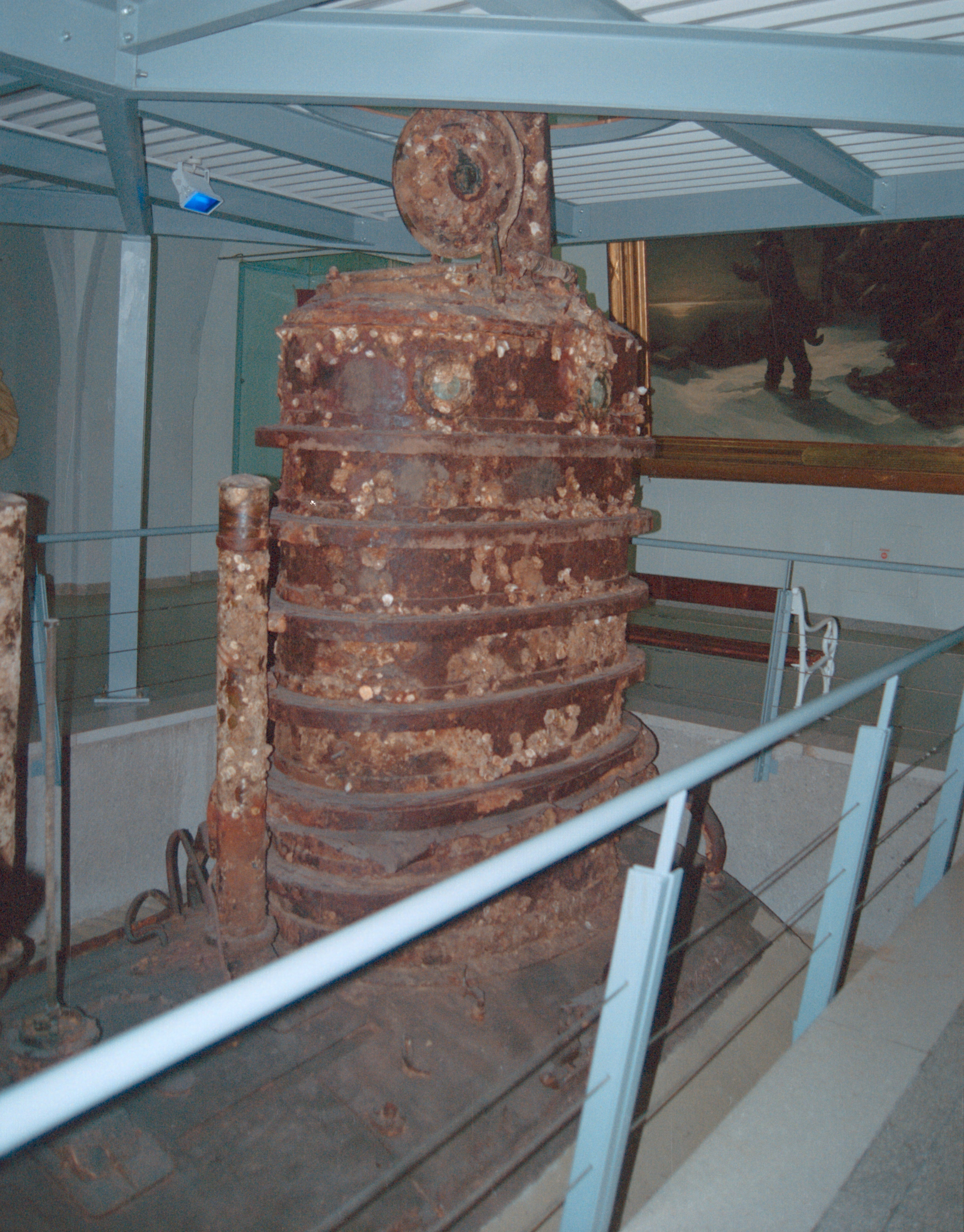
The conning tower of U-20 on display at the Heeresgeschichtliches Museum in Vienna

SM U-20, the lead boat of the class, was laid down on 29 September 1915 at the Pola Navy Yard. She was launched on 18 September 1916. During diving trials in March 1917, U-20 was accidentally rammed by the Austro-Hungarian Navy light cruiser Admiral Spaun, which required seven months of repairs for the U-boat. U-20 was commissioned on 20 October, and operated out of Pola and Trieste. She was in the estuary of the Tagliamento river in early July 1918 when she was spotted by the surfaced Italian submarine F12. U-20 was hit by one torpedo at a range of 650 yards (590 m) and sank with all hands west of Trieste near position 45°29′N 13°02′E. (Note: Sources report the date of the attack as being variously on the night of 4/5 July, on 6 July, or on 9 July.) The wreck of U-20 was raised and salvaged in 1962. Remains of her crewmen were interred on the grounds of the Theresian Military Academy at Wiener Neustadt. The conning tower and a midship section were donated to the Heeresgeschichtliches Museum in Vienna, where they are on display. U-20 did not sink any ships during her service.

=== SM U-21 ===
SM U-21 was built at the Pola Navy Yard and was launched on 15 August 1916, and was the first of the class to be launched. U-21 was damaged in a diving trial in January 1917, requiring seven months for repairs. The U-boat was commissioned on 15 August 1917. In early October, U-21 conducted patrols off the Albanian coast, but a mid-October Mediterranean patrol was cut short by a leaky seal on her main hatch. After an additional eight months of repairs, U-21 again conducted patrols off Albania. A broken piston in her diesel engine cut short her war career. At Pola at the war's end, U-21 was ceded to Italy in 1920 as a war reparation and broken up. U-21 did not have any successes during the war.

=== SM U-22 ===
SM U-22 was built at the Hungarian UBAG yard and was launched on 27 January 1917, the last of the class to be launched. The still-incomplete boat sank in the harbor at Fiume in June 1917, but was raised, repaired, and relaunched in October. From her November commissioning, U-22 conducted patrols off the Po River estuary and, later, northern Adriatic patrols from Trieste. After three months of repairs for her failed electric motor in mid 1918, U-22 resumed service, patrolling the Montenegrin coast out of Cattaro. In port at Cattaro at war's end, she was ceded to France as a war reparation and broken up. U-22 sank no ships during the war.

=== SM U-23 ===
SM U-23 was laid down on 8 December 1915 at the Hungarian UBAG yard and was launched on 5 January 1917. She was commissioned on 1 September and initially patrolled off the Italian towns of Rimini and Ancona. After being transferred to Cattaro in late December, U-23 departed on her final patrol on 20 February 1918. The following day, Linienschiffsleutnant Klemens Ritter von Bézard, U-23's only commanding officer, guided the boat in an attack on the Italian transport Memfi in the Straits of Otranto. U-23 then came under attack from the Italian destroyer Airone; after first trying to ram the U-boat, the destroyer deployed an explosive paravane. When the paravane came into contact with the submerged U-23, it blew debris into the air, sinking the submarine with all hands. Like all of her sister boats, U-23 had no wartime successes.

== Bibliography ==
- Baumgartner, Lothar; Erwin Sieche (1999). Die Schiffe der k.(u.)k. Kriegsmarine im Bild = Austro-Hungarian warships in photographs (in German). Wien: Verlagsbuchhandlung Stöhr. ISBN 978-3-901208-25-6. OCLC 43596931.
- Gardiner, Robert, ed. (1985). Conway's All the World's Fighting Ships 1906–1921. Annapolis, Maryland: Naval Institute Press. ISBN 978-0-87021-907-8. OCLC 12119866.
- Gibson, R. H.; Prendergast, Maurice (2003) [1931]. The German Submarine War, 1914–1918. Annapolis, Maryland: Naval Institute Press. ISBN 978-1-59114-314-7. OCLC 52924732.
- Grant, Robert M. (2002) [1964]. U-boats Destroyed: The Effect of Anti-submarine Warfare, 1914–1918. Penzance: Periscope. ISBN 978-1-904381-00-6. OCLC 50215640.
- Halpern, Paul G. (1994). A Naval History of World War I. Annapolis, Maryland: Naval Institute Press. ISBN 978-0-87021-266-6. OCLC 28411665.
