= Havmanden-class submarine (1911) =

Royal Danish Navy's Havmanden-class of submarines

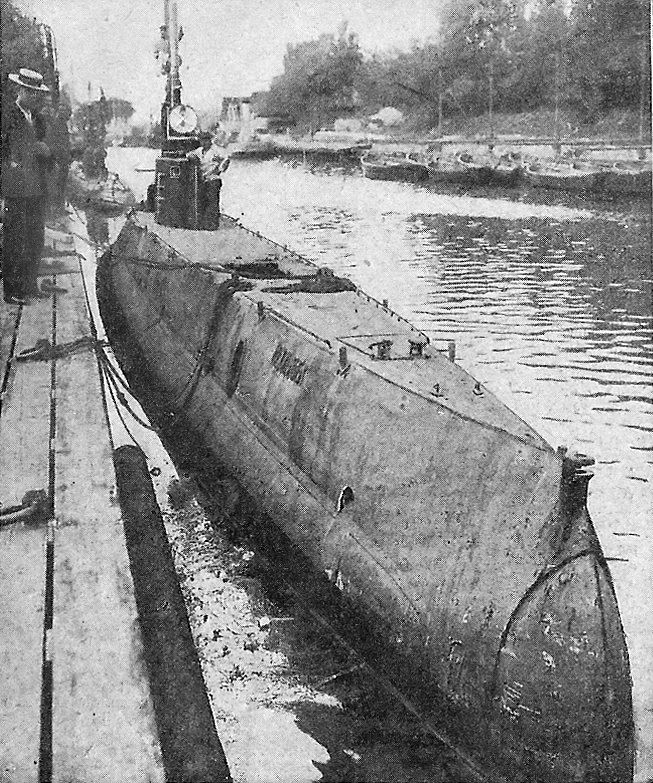
- Havmanden, the class leader of the Havmanden class

Class overview
- Builders: Whitehead & Co., Fiume (3); Copenhagen Navy Yard (3)
- Operators: Royal Danish Navy
- Preceded by: Dykkeren
- Succeeded by: B class
- Built: 1911–1914
- In commission: 1912–1932
- Completed: 6
- Retired: 6

General characteristics
- Type: Submarine
- Displacement: 164 tonnes (181 short tons) surfaced; 204 tonnes (225 short tons) submerged
- Length: 127 ft 8 in (38.91 m)
- Beam: 11 ft 10 in (3.61 m)
- Draft: 7 ft 7 in (2.31 m)
- Propulsion: 1 × shaft; 1 × 6-cylinder diesel engine, 430–450 bhp (320–340 kW); 2 × electric motors
- Speed: 13 knots (24 km/h) surfaced; 10 knots (19 km/h) submerged
- Range: 1,400 nautical miles (2,600 km) at 10 knots (19 km/h) surfaced; 23 nautical miles (43 km) at 8 knots (15 km/h) submerged
- Complement: 10, as built; 14, later
- Armament: 2 × 457 mm (18 in) bow torpedo tubes; 1 × 8 mm (0.31 in) machine gun (after 1917)

The Havmanden class was a class of six submarines built for the Royal Danish Navy from 1911 to 1914. Also later known as the A class, the boats were designed by the Austro-Hungarian firm Whitehead & Co. of Fiume. The first three submarines were built by the company, while the remaining three were constructed under license in Copenhagen.

The boats were just over 127 feet (39 m) long and their armament consisted of two 457 mm (18 in) bow torpedo tubes, later supplemented with an 8 mm (0.31 in) machine gun. The boats had a single shaft and were propelled by a Fiat or M.A.N. diesel engine on the surface and two electric motors while submerged.

Although there was at least one close call for the class leader Havmanden during World War I, none of the six boats was sunk in service. All six boats of the class remained active in the Royal Danish Navy from their time of construction until 1928, when the first two boats were stricken. The remaining boats were all stricken by 1932. The Havmanden class served as the basis for the Austro-Hungarian Navy's U-20-class submarines built during World War I.

== Design and construction ==
After taking delivery of its first submarine—the problematic HDMS Dykkeren, built at La Spezia by Fiat-Laurenti in 1909—the Royal Danish Navy looked for a submarine design that could be built in Denmark. In 1910, the Navy contracted with Whitehead & Co. of Fiume for the class' namesake boat, Havmanden, to be built by Whitehead, and plans for a second, Havfruen, to be built at the Copenhagen Navy Yard. In May 1911, while the first two were still under construction, the Navy ordered two more boats from Whitehead, Thetis and Triton, and plans for a final two, Najaden and Nymfen.

The Havmanden-class boats were submarines that displaced 164 tonnes (181 short tons) surfaced and 204 tonnes (225 short tons) submerged. The boats were 127 feet 8 inches (38.91 m) long with a beam of 11 feet 10 inches (3.61 m) and a draft of 7 feet 7 inches (2.31 m). For propulsion, they featured a single shaft, a single Fiat or M.A.N. diesel engine for surface running, and twin electric motors for submerged travel. The diesels of the Whitehead boats were rated at 430 bhp (320 kW), while the Copenhagen boats were 450 bhp (340 kW).

The boats were equipped with two bow torpedo tubes of 457 mm (18.0 in), but had no deck guns. In 1917, all were outfitted with a single 8 mm (0.31 in) machine gun. The complement of the boats as built was ten men, but was later increased to fourteen.

In December 1911, Havmanden became the first boat of the class to be launched, with Havfruen and Thetis following in 1912. Triton and Najaden were launched in 1913, while Nymfen, the final ship constructed, was launched in February 1914.

After the outbreak of World War I, the Austro-Hungarian Navy seized plans for the Havmanden boats from Whitehead & Co. and used them as the basis for its four U-20-class submarines.

== Service careers ==
Initially Havfruen, Havmanden, and Thetis received pennant numbers of H 1, H 2, and T 1, respectively, but were changed to 2, 3, and 4 in April 1913. The other three submarines—2den April (the newly renamed Triton), Najaden, and Nymfen—received pennant numbers 5, 6, and 7 at the same time.

Sources do not report when any of the Havmanden boats were commissioned, but all boats were active for neutral Denmark during World War I. Havmanden had a narrow escape in September 1914 when a British submarine mistook her for a German U-boat and launched an unsuccessful torpedo attack on her.

Late in their careers, the class was identified as the A class and the pennant numbers of all the submarines were prefixed with an A, becoming A-2 to A-7. None of the boats, however, ever displayed an A on their conning towers. Havmanden and Thetis were the first two boats taken out of service when they were stricken in April 1928. Havfruen was the last boat removed from service when she was stricken in May 1932.

== Class members ==
There were six submarines of the Havmanden or A class.

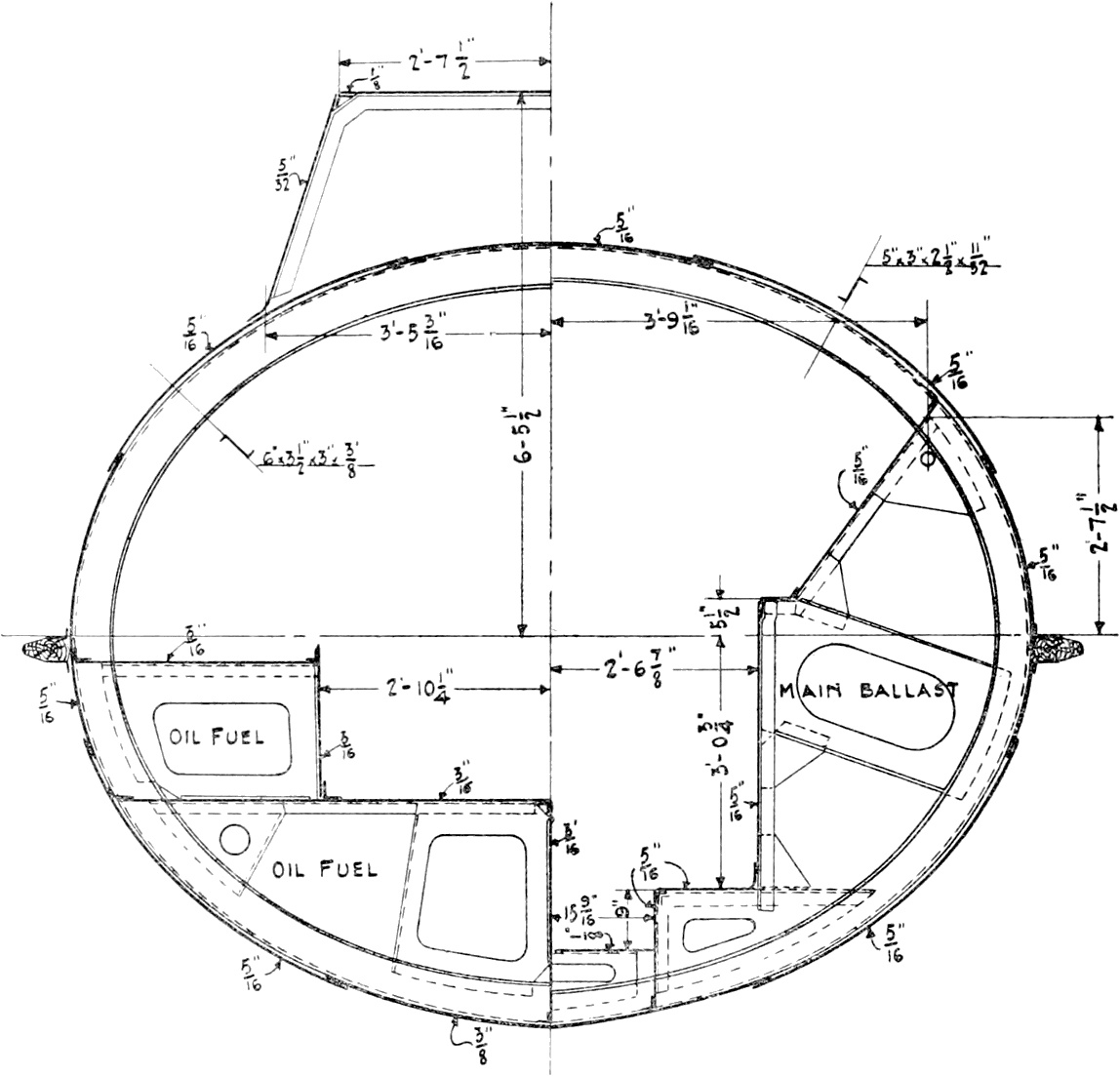
A cross section of the Danish submarine Havmanden, the lead ship of the class

=== Havfruen (A 2) ===
The plans for Havfruen were purchased in 1910 and the boat was built at the Copenhagen Navy Yard. She was launched on 31 August 1912. She initially received the pennant number of H 1, but was assigned the number 2 in April 1913. She was later designated A 2 when the class became known as the A class late in her career. Havfruen was the last ship of the class to be removed from service when she was stricken on 3 May 1932.

=== Havmanden (A 3) ===
Havmanden was ordered in 1910 from Whitehead & Co. in Fiume. She was launched on 23 December 1911. She initially received the pennant number of H 2, but was assigned the number 3 in April 1913. In September 1914, Havmanden, displaying her pennant number of 3 on her conning tower, was mistaken for the German U-boat SM U-3 by the British submarine HMS E11, but Havmanden escaped without damage when E11's torpedo missed its mark. Havmanden was designated A 3 when the class became known as the A class later in her career. Along with Thetis, she was one of the first two boats of the class removed from service when stricken on 26 April 1928.

=== Thetis (A 4) ===
Thetis was ordered in May 1911 from Whitehead & Co. in Fiume. She was launched on 19 June 1912. She initially received the pennant number of T 1, but was assigned the number 4 in April 1913. Thetis was designated A 4 when the class became known as the A class later in her career. She and Havmanden were stricken on 26 April 1928, the first two boats of the class to be removed from service.

=== 2den April (A 5) ===
Triton was ordered in May 1911 from Whitehead & Co. in Fiume. She was launched on 31 March 1913. Her purchase was financed by a subscription offer made by the public and, as a result, she had been renamed 2den April—in honor of the first Battle of Copenhagen, fought on 2 April 1801—by the time she was assigned the pennant number 5 in April 1913. She was designated A 5 when the class became known as the A class later in her career. After 2den April was stricken on 15 January 1929, she was used as a target and ultimately broken up in 1932.

=== Najaden (A 6) ===
The plans for Najaden were purchased in May 1911 and the boat was built at the Copenhagen Navy Yard. She was launched on 9 July 1913. She was assigned the pennant number of 6 in April 1913. She was designated A 6 when the class became known as the A class later in her career and was stricken on 9 September 1931.

=== Nymfen (A 7) ===
The plans for Nymfen were purchased in May 1911 and the boat was built at the Copenhagen Navy Yard. She was launched on 10 February 1914, and was the final ship of the class launched. She was assigned the pennant number of 7 in April 1913, but designated A 7 when the class became known as the A class later in her career. Nymfen was stricken on 11 March 1932.

== Bibliography ==
- Compton-Hall, Richard (2004) [1991]. Submarines at War, 1914–18. Penzance: Periscope Publishing. ISBN 978-1-904381-21-1. OCLC 57639764.
- Gardiner, Robert, ed. (1985). Conway's All the World's Fighting Ships 1906–1921. Annapolis, Maryland: Naval Institute Press. ISBN 978-0-87021-907-8. OCLC 12119866.
- Miller, David (2002). The Illustrated Directory of Submarines of the World. St. Paul, Minnesota: MBI Pub. Co. ISBN 978-0-7603-1345-9. OCLC 50208951.
