= Austro-Hungarian Navy =

Branch of the military of Austria-Hungary

- Kaiserliche und königliche Kriegsmarine (German); Császári és Királyi Haditengerészet (Hungarian)
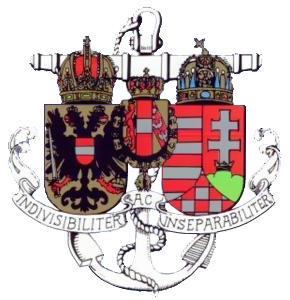
- Coat of arms of the Austro-Hungarian Navy
- Active: 1786–1867 (as the Austrian Empire Navy); 1867–1918 (as the Austro-Hungarian Navy)
- Country: Austrian Empire (1786–1867); Austria-Hungary (1867–1918)
- Type: Navy
- Role: Defence of Austria-Hungary's naval interests, its merchant marine, and its coastline
- Size: 1914: 20,000 personnel; 4 dreadnoughts; 9 pre-dreadnoughts; 3 coastal defense ships; 3 armored cruisers; 2 torpedo cruisers; 5 protected cruisers; 2 scout cruisers; 18 destroyers; 25 high seas torpedo craft; 29 coastal torpedo craft; 6 submarines
- Part of: Austro-Hungarian Armed Forces
- Garrison/HQ: The Naval Section of the War Ministry
- Nickname: "Trieste Navy" (18th century)
- Mottos: Indivisibiliter ac Inseparabiliter (Latin: Indivisibly and Inseparably)
- Engagements: As the Austrian Navy: Napoleonic Wars; Austrian expedition against Morocco (1829); Oriental Crisis of 1840; First Italian War of Independence; Second Italian War of Independence; Second Schleswig War; Third War of Italian Independence; As the Austro-Hungarian Navy: Krivošije uprising (1869); Cretan Revolt of 1897-1898; Boxer Rebellion; World War I

Commanders
- Holy Roman Emperor (1786–1804): Joseph II (1786–1790); Leopold II (1790–1792); Francis II (1792–1804)
- Emperor of Austria (1804–1867): Francis I (1804–1835); Ferdinand I (1835–1848); Franz Joseph I (1848–1867)
- Emperor of Austria and King of Hungary (1867–1918): Franz Joseph I (1867–1916); Karl I (1916–1918)
- Commander-in-Chief of the Navy (German: Oberkommandant der Marine): Hans Birch Dahlerup (February 1849 – August 1851); Franz Graf Wimpffen (August 1851 – September 1854); Archduke Ferdinand Maximilian of Austria (September 1854 – 1861); Ludwig von Fautz (1861 – March 1865); Wilhelm von Tegetthoff (March 1868 – April 1871); Friedrich von Pöck (April 1871 – November 1883); Maximilian Daublebsky von Sterneck (November 1883 – December 1897); Hermann von Spaun (December 1897 – October 1904); Rudolf Montecuccoli (October 1904 – February 1913); Anton Haus (February 1913 – February 1917); Maximilian Njegovan (April 1917 – February 1918)
- Commander-in-Chief of the Fleet (German: Flottenkommandant): Anton Haus (July 1914 – February 1917); Maximilian Njegovan (February 1917 – February 1918); Miklós Horthy (February 1918 – November 1918)
- Chief of the Naval Section of the War Ministry (German: Chef der Marinesektion): Ludwig von Fautz (March 1865 – April 1868); Wilhelm von Tegetthoff (March 1868 – April 1871); Friedrich von Pöck (October 1872 – November 1883); Maximilian Daublebsky von Sterneck (November 1883 – December 1897); Hermann von Spaun (December 1897 – October 1904); Rudolf Montecuccoli (October 1904 – February 1913); Anton Haus (February 1913 – February 1917); Karl Kailer von Kaltenfels (February 1917 – April 1917); Maximilian Njegovan (April 1917 – February 1918); Franz von Holub (February 1918 – November 1918)

Insignia
- Naval ensign: 1786–1915

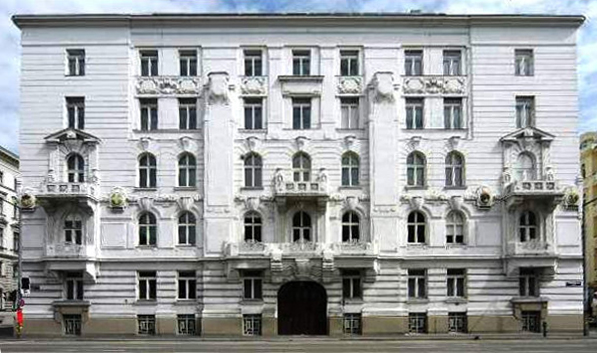
The Naval Section of the War Ministry Headquarters

The Austro-Hungarian Navy or Imperial and Royal War Navy (German: kaiserliche und königliche Kriegsmarine, in short k.u.k. Kriegsmarine, Hungarian: Császári és Királyi Haditengerészet) was the naval force of Austria-Hungary. Ships of the Austro-Hungarian Navy were designated SMS, for Seiner Majestät Schiff (His Majesty's Ship). The k.u.k. Kriegsmarine came into being after the formation of Austria-Hungary in 1867, and ceased to exist in 1918 upon the Empire's defeat and subsequent collapse at the end of World War I.

Before 1867, the Imperial Austrian Navy or simply the Austrian Navy, saw action in the French Revolutionary Wars, the Napoleonic Wars, the Austrian expedition against Morocco (1829), the Second Egyptian–Ottoman War, the First and Second Wars of Italian Independence, the Second Schleswig War, and the Third War of Italian Independence. Following Austria's defeat by Prussia and Italy during the Seven Weeks' War, the Austrian Empire reformed itself into the dual monarchy of Austria-Hungary, and the navy also became the Austro-Hungarian Navy. Largely neglected by the Empire in its early years, the k.u.k. Kriegsmarine expanded along with Austro-Hungarian industrialization into one of the largest navies in the Adriatic and Mediterranean Seas. By 1914, the k.u.k. Kriegsmarine had a peacetime strength of 20,000 personnel, seeing action in the Boxer Rebellion and other conflicts before World War I.

During most of World War I, the Allied Powers maintained the Otranto Barrage to bottle up the k.u.k. Kriegsmarine in the Adriatic Sea. Largely tasked with defending the Empire's 1,130 nautical miles (2,090 km; 1,300 mi) of coastline and 2,170 nautical miles (4,020 km; 2,500 mi) of island seaboard, the Navy chose to rely on its U-boats to attack Allied shipping rather than risk the destruction of its battleships, cruisers and other surface vessels. In June 1918, it attempted to break the Otranto Barrage with a large naval fleet, but the attack was called off after the battleship Szent István was sunk by an Italian torpedo boat on 10 June.

Five months later, with the Austro-Hungarian Empire facing collapse and defeat in the war, the Empire decided to transfer most of its navy to the newly declared State of Slovenes, Croats and Serbs on 31 October, effectively bringing the k.u.k. Kriegsmarine to an end. Three days later, the Empire's military authorities signed the Armistice of Villa Giusti, pulling the rapidly disintegrating empire out of the war. With the signing of the Treaty of Saint-Germain-en-Laye and the Treaty of Trianon, Austria and Hungary became landlocked, and the Empire's most important ports of Trieste, Pola, Fiume and Ragusa became part of Italy and Yugoslavia. The k.u.k. Kriegsmarine's main ships were turned over to the Allies, who scrapped most of them in the 1920s during the era of naval disarmament.

== History ==
=== Origins ===
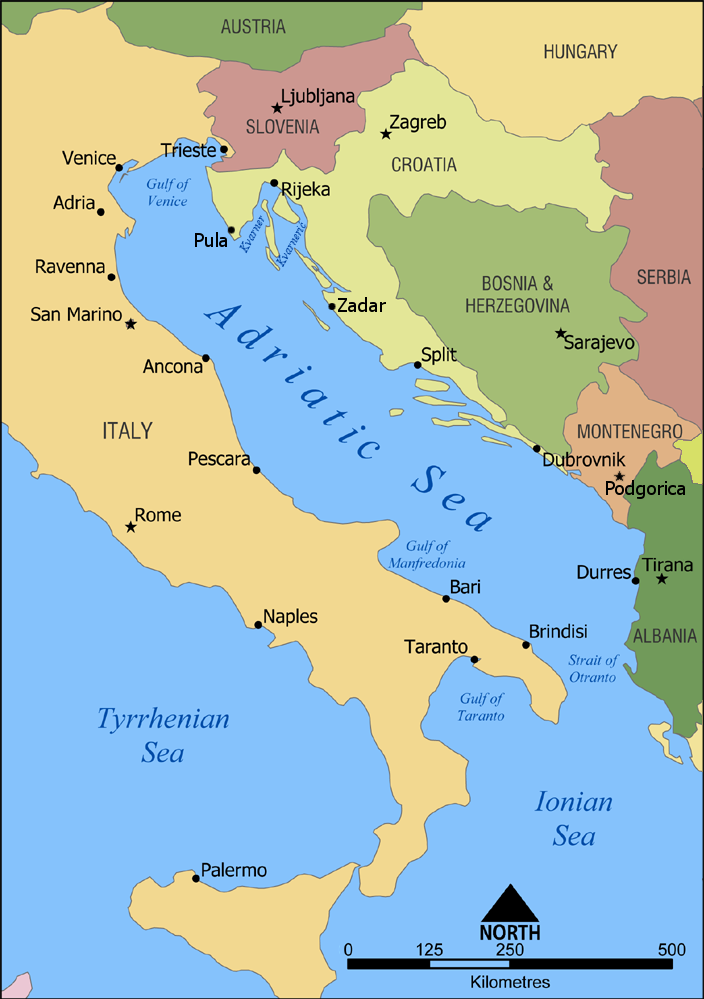
An overview of Adriatic ports today

The k.u.k. Kriegsmarine was not formally established until the 18th century, but its origins can be traced back to 1382, with the incorporation of Trieste into the Duchy of Austria. During the 13th and 14th centuries, Trieste became a maritime trade rival to the Republic of Venice, which occupied the Adriatic port city for intermittent periods between 1283 and 1372. Under the terms of the Peace of Turin in 1381, Venice renounced its claim to Trieste and the leading citizens of Trieste petitioned Leopold III, Duke of Austria, to make the port part of his domains. The agreement incorporating Trieste into the Duchy of Austria was signed at the castle of Graz on 30 September 1382.

While Austria had a port with the incorporation of Trieste, the city was granted a large degree of autonomy and successive Dukes of Austria paid little attention to the port or the idea of deploying a navy to protect it. Until the end of the 18th century, there were only limited attempts to establish an Austrian navy. During the Thirty Years War, Generalissimo Albrecht von Wallenstein was awarded the Duchies of Mecklenburg-Schwerin and Mecklenburg-Güstrow as well as given the title "Admiral of the North and Baltic Seas" by Holy Roman Emperor Ferdinand II in 1628 after scoring several military victories against Denmark–Norway in northern Germany. However, Wallenstein failed to capture Stralsund, which resisted the Capitulation of Franzburg and the subsequent siege with assistance of Danish, Scottish and Swedish troops, a blow that denied him access to the Baltic and the chance of challenging the naval power of the Scandinavian kingdoms and of the Netherlands. Wallenstein's assassination at the hands of his own officers in 1634 prevented the development of any Austrian navy in either the North or Baltic Seas.

The next incursion Austria took into naval affairs occurred on the Danube River rather than at sea. During the Great Turkish War, Prince Eugene of Savoy employed a small flotilla of ships along the Danube to fight the Ottoman Empire, a practice which the House of Habsburg had employed previously during the 16th and 17th centuries to fight during Austria's numerous wars with the Ottomans. These river flotillas were largely manned by crews who came from Austria's coastal ports, and played a significant role in transporting troops across the Danube as well as denying Turkish control over the strategically important river. Significant portion of the Danube flotila were made up by Serb Šajkaši.

Austria remained without a proper seagoing navy, however, even after the need for one became apparent with the French Navy bombardment of the port of Trieste during the War of Spanish Succession. Lacking any sea power, Austria was unable to protect its coastal cities or project power into the Adriatic or Mediterranean Seas. The war ended with the treaties of Utrecht, Rastatt, and Baden. Under the terms of the Treaty of Rastatt, Austria gained the Spanish Netherlands, the Kingdom of Naples, the Kingdom of Sicily, the Kingdom of Sardinia, and the Duchy of Milan. While Austria's control over Sardinia and Naples was cut short by their loss to Spain in 1734 during the War of Polish Succession, these territories as well as the new Austrian Netherlands gave Austria greater access to the sea than ever before.

Following the War of Spanish Succession, Austria once again developed interest in establishing a proper navy in order to protect its now numerous coastal possessions. This coincided with the majority of European nations' growing interest in mercantilism, the founding and development of colonies, and the chartering of overseas trading companies during the early 18th century. Austria's largest obstacle in engaging in overseas trade and naval enterprises however lay in the country's geography. Despite Austria having a lengthy coastline along the Adriatic Sea, the major ports it possessed along its main coastline were isolated from Vienna by the large Austrian Alps. Furthermore, there were no major rivers linking Austria's Adriatic ports to the interior of the country. Austria also enjoyed three major navigable rivers which flowed through the country, the Elbe, the Oder, and the Danube. However, the Elbe and the Oder flowed through the Kingdom of Prussia before emptying into the North and Baltic Sea respectively, while the mouth of the Danube lay within the territory of the Ottoman Empire. Both of these nations remained major rivals of Austria throughout the 18th century, preventing the Austrians from using its major rivers to gain access to the sea.

==== The Ostend Company ====
Following the War of Spanish Succession, Austria's greatest outlet to the sea lay in the newly acquired Austrian Netherlands. While non-contiguous with the rest of Austria, the Austrian Netherlands lay within the boundaries of the Habsburg-dominated Holy Roman Empire. The territory also possessed numerous ports with easy access to the Atlantic Ocean, such as Ghent, Antwerp, Bruges and Ostend. However, the economy of the Austrian Netherlands was very disconnected from the rest of Austria, and most Habsburg rulers paid little attention to the province. Even Prince Eugene of Savoy, upon being appointed Governor-General of the Austrian Netherlands in June 1716, chose to remain in Vienna and direct policy through his chosen representative, Hercule-Louis Turinetti, marquis of Prié.

The success of the Dutch, British and French East India Companies throughout the 17th and early 18th centuries however led the merchants and shipowners of Ostend to want to establish direct commercial relations with the East Indies. In December 1722, Charles VI granted a 30-year charter to the Ostend Company to conduct trade with the East and West Indies, as well as Africa. The Ostend Company proved to be immensely profitable, and between 1724 and 1732, 21 company vessels were sent out to conduct trade in the Caribbean, Africa, and especially Asia. The most profitable voyages of the Ostend Company were to Canton, as rising tea prices resulted in high profits for ships conducting trade with China. Between 1719 and 1728, the Ostend Company transported 7 million pounds of tea from China, roughly half of the total amount brought to western Europe at the time, placing the company on par in the tea trade with the East India Company. The Ostend Company proved to be short lived however, as Charles VI suspended the charter of the company due to British diplomatic requests following the Treaty of Vienna, with the company ceasing operations in 1731.

==== Charles VI and Maria Theresa ====
Believing that "Navigation and commerce are the foremost pillars of the state," Holy Roman Emperor Charles VI engaged in other projects beyond the establishment of the Ostend Company in order to increase Austria's merchant marine and establish a proper navy to protect it. This included constructing a new road through the Semmering Pass in order to link Vienna to Trieste, and declaring Trieste and Fiume free ports in 1719. In order to help protect Austrian merchants from piracy in the Adriatic and Mediterranean, Charles VI purchased the 80-gun ship of the line Cumberland from Britain in 1720. The ship was renamed San Carlos and stationed out of Naples before being decommissioned and broken up in 1733.

On the Adriatic, Charles VI constructed even more ships, usually employing Italian and Spanish officers to man them. This Adriatic fleet consisted of three ships of the line, one frigate, and several galleys. In total, this Adriatic fleet had 500 guns and a crew of 8,000 men. Following the end of the Ostend Company however, a committee was set up in 1738 by the Emperor to examine the status of Austria's Adriatic fleet. Its report concluded that the fleet "had little usefulness, caused great expense, and stood in danger of being defeated in case of attack". This report eventually led to Charles VI scrapping his Adriatic fleet and transferring most of officers and crew members to Austria's Danube Flotilla.

Upon the death of Charles VI on 19 October 1740, Saxony, Prussia, Bavaria, and France all repudiated the Pragmatic Sanction of 1713 which had paved the way for Charles' daughter Maria Theresa to succeed him. Frederick II of Prussia almost immediately invaded Austria in December 1740 and took the affluent Habsburg province of Silesia in the seven-year conflict known as the War of the Austrian Succession. This conflict proved to be primarily a land-based war for Austria, which led to naval affairs being neglected by the newly crowned Maria Theresa, who spent the entirety of the war preoccupied with securing her inheritance of the throne of Austria as opposed to rebuilding her father's former fleet in the Adriatic.

By the time the Seven Years' War began in 1756, Austria still lacked a proper navy. Enemy pirates and privateers, as well as Barbary corsairs severely hampered Austria's merchant marine, to the point that most of Austria's sea trade had to be conducted in foreign ships. The lack of any naval force to protect Austria's shipping led Count Kaunitz to push for the creation of a small force of frigates to protect the Adriatic Sea. However, the Seven Years' War forced Vienna to pay much more attention to Austria's land border with Prussia and its coastline along the Adriatic Sea, preventing Kaunitz's program from achieving success.

In 1775, another attempt to formulate an overseas trading company was undertaken with the establishment of the Austrian East India Company. Headed by William Bolts, the company's first voyage to India began on 24 September 1776 with Bolts sailing aboard the Indiaman Giuseppe e Teresa from Livorno in the Grand Duchy of Tuscany, which was ruled by Maria Theresa's son Leopold. Bolts was also granted a 10-year charter to trade under the flag of the Holy Roman Empire with Persia, India, China and Africa.

The Austrian East India Company marked the first attempt by Austria to establish overseas colonies. Within the next two years, Bolts established factories on the Malabar Coast, on the southeastern African coast at Delagoa Bay, and at the Nicobar Islands. These ventures ultimately failed however due to pressure from other colonial powers such as Portugal and Denmark-Norway, both of which forcefully evicted Bolts and his colonists from Africa and the Bay of Bengal respectively. Furthermore, the Austrian government did not wish to provoke other foreign powers after having to fight two major continental wars in the span of just 20 years. Vienna was also unwilling to lend much monetary support to either the company or towards the creation of a navy sufficiently large enough to protect its interests. This was partially because the Austrian government expected the ports of Trieste and Fiume to bear the cost of constructing and maintaining a fleet.

=== Establishment of the Austrian Navy ===
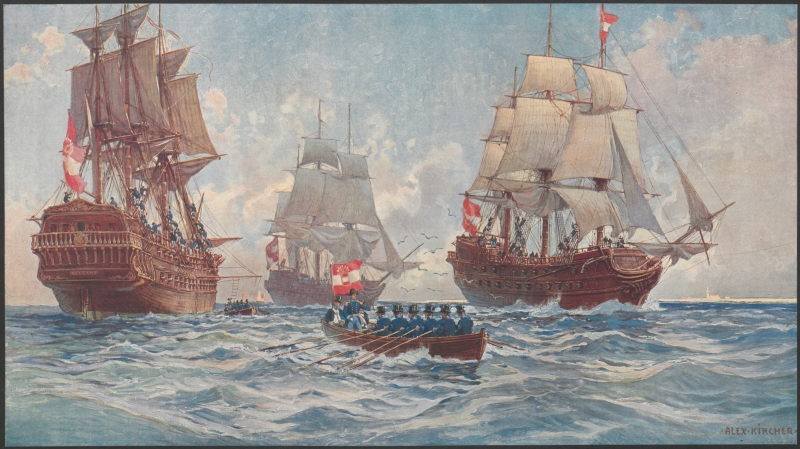
The Ships of the Line Laharpe, Stengel and Beyrand by Alexander Kircher, depicting three Austrian ships of the line after their capture at Ancona

The Austrian Navy was finally established in 1786, with Emperor Joseph II purchasing two cutters in Ostend, each armed with 20 guns, and sending them to Trieste. Joseph II also introduced Austria's Naval Ensign, which consisted of a red-white-red standard with the crown of the Archduchy of Austria on the left. Prior to this, Austrian ships flew the yellow and black flag of the Habsburg Monarchy. Joseph II's Marineflagge remained the naval ensign of Austria, and later Austria-Hungary, until the middle of World War I.

The onset of the French Revolution in 1789 and the subsequent French Revolutionary Wars greatly changed the political face of Europe and resulted in the largest expansion of the Austrian Navy up to that point in time. Under Joseph II's successor, Leopold II, the Austrian Navy was formally located out of the port of Trieste. In 1797 with the Treaty of Campo Formio between France and Austria which ended the War of the First Coalition, Austria ceded to France the Austrian Netherlands and certain islands in the Mediterranean, including Corfu and the other Ionian Islands. The Republic of Venice and its territories were divided between the two states, and Austria received the city of Venice along with Istria and Dalmatia. Venice's naval forces and facilities were also handed over to Austria and became the basis of the formation of the future Austrian Navy.

The Treaty of Campo Formio resulted in Austria becoming the largest, and indeed the only, naval power in the Adriatic. Prior to the incorporation of the remnants of the Venetian navy, the Austrian Navy only consisted of the two cutters purchased in 1786, as well as several armed merchant vessels and gunboats. While Venice had suffered under French occupation, the ships Austria acquired from the city's annexation still allowed the Austrian Navy to grow to some 37 vessels by the start of the War of the Second Coalition in 1799. These ships mostly consisted of small coastal craft, with some 111 guns and 787 crew members between them. This still remained a very small naval force, which with an average of just three guns and 21 crew members per ship, was largely unable to project power outside of the Adriatic or protect Austrian shipping in the Mediterranean. When the Austrian Army took Ancona in 1799, three former Venetian ships of the line, Laharpe, Stengel and Beyrand, were seized by the Austrians. Despite having 74 guns per ship, far more than any other vessels in the Adriatic, the Austrian government chose to sell the ships for breaking rather than incorporate them into the Navy.

At the end of the 18th century, several new regulations were also imposed regarding naval activity. These included instructing officers to refrain from excessive shouting when giving sailing commands, directing the captains of each ship in the navy not to conduct business transactions on their own behalf, and ordering surgeons to fumigate their ships several times a day in order to prevent the outbreak of any disease. The most notable regulation imposed directed naval officers to learn German. At the time, most Austrian naval officers were Italian or Spanish, and Italian remained the main language of the officer corps until 1848. This policy change however reflected Austria's desire to re-order its multi-ethnic Empire more towards the German states of the Holy Roman Empire.

==== The Napoleonic Wars ====
The Austrian Empire following the Treaty of Schönbrunn, which left Austria landlocked and without a navy

On 17 March 1802, Archduke Charles of Austria, acting in his role as "Inspector General of the Navy", ordered the formation of the "Imperial and Royal Naval Cadet School" in Venice (German: k.u.k. Marine-Kadettenschule). This school eventually moved to Trieste in 1848 and changed its name to "Imperial and Royal Naval Academy" (German: k.u.k. Marine-Akademie).

Austria again fought against France during the Second and Third Coalitions, when after meeting a crushing defeat at Austerlitz, Holy Roman Emperor Francis II had to agree to the Treaty of Pressburg, weakening the Austrian Empire and reorganizing Germany under a Napoleonic imprint known as the Confederation of the Rhine.

Believing his position as Holy Roman Emperor to be untenable, Francis abdicated the throne of the Holy Roman Empire on 6 August 1806, and declared the Holy Roman Empire to be dissolved in the same declaration. This was a political move to impair the legitimacy of the Confederation of the Rhine. Two years earlier, as a reaction to Napoleon making himself an Emperor of the French, Francis had raised Austria to the status of an empire. Hence, after 1806, he reigned as Francis I, Emperor of Austria. This move meant that the naval forces under the banner of the Holy Roman Empire were now reconstituted as solely being a part of the Austrian Navy.

Three years later Austria again declared war on France, beginning the War of the Fifth Coalition. Following Austria's defeat at the Battle of Wagram, the Empire sued for peace. The resulting Treaty of Schönbrunn imposed harsh terms on Austria. Austria had to hand over the Duchy of Salzburg to the Kingdom of Bavaria and lost its access to the Adriatic Sea by ceding the Littoral territories of Gorizia and Gradisca and the Imperial Free City of Trieste, together with Carniola, the March of Istria, western Carinthia with East Tyrol, and the Croatian lands southwest of the river Sava to the French Empire. West Galicia was ceded to the Duchy of Warsaw, and Tarnopol was given to the Russian Empire. These terms eliminated Austria's coastline along the Adriatic, thus destroying the Austrian Navy, with its warships being handed over to the French to guard the newly formed the Illyrian provinces. Between 1809 and 1814, there was no Austrian coastline and subsequently no navy to defend it.

=== Modernising the Navy ===
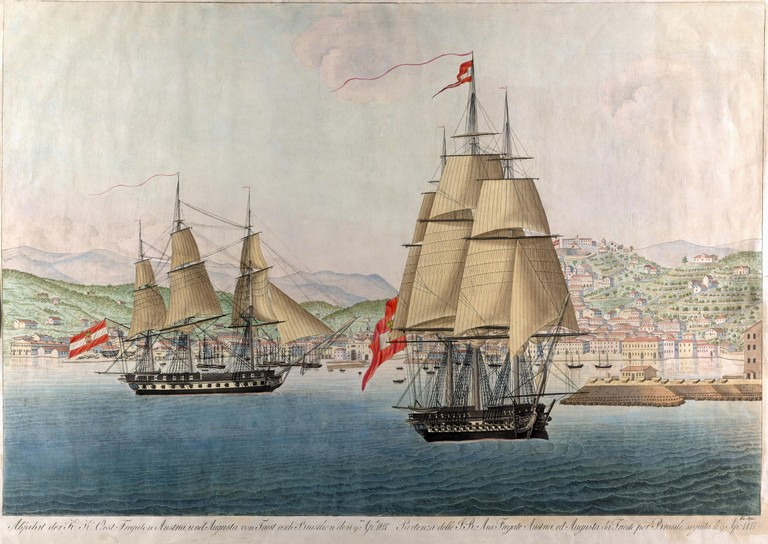
The Austrian frigates Augusta and Austria in the port of Trieste prior to the voyage of Maria Leopoldina to Brazil

Following the Congress of Vienna and the 1815 Treaty of Paris, Austria's coastline was restored. Under the conditions of the Congress of Vienna, the former Austrian Netherlands were transferred to the newly created United Kingdom of the Netherlands, while Austria received Lombardy-Venetia as compensation. These territorial changes gave Austria five ships of the line, two frigates, one corvette, and several smaller ships which had been left in Venice by the French during the Napoleonic Wars. The decades of warfare Austria had participated in since 1789 however had left the Empire on the verge of bankruptcy, and most of these ships were sold or abandoned for financial reasons.

By the end of the decade however, the Austrian Navy began to be rebuilt. The growth of the Austrian Navy in the years following the Congress of Vienna were largely driven by political necessities, as well economic conditions. The marriage between Archduchess Maria Leopoldina and Emperor Pedro I of Brazil in 1817 marked the first time a ship from the Austrian Navy crossed the Atlantic Ocean to the Americas, with the Archduchess traveling with the frigates Augusta and Austria to Rio de Janeiro. Three years later, the frigate Carolina escorted Austria's ambassador to Brazil across the Atlantic, before sailing on to China, marking the first time a ship from the Austrian Navy had traveled to East Asia. During the 1820s and early 1830s, Austrian trade along the Danube and within the Mediterranean grew rapidly. In 1830, the Austrian Danube Steam Navigation Company was founded and in 1834, its steamship Marie Dorothee became the first of its kind to travel the Mediterranean on a voyage between Trieste and Constantinople. In 1836, the Austrian Lloyd (German: Österreichischer Lloyd) was established. While Austria's merchant marine grew throughout the 1820s and 1830s, the Austrian Navy grew alongside it in order to provide protection on the high seas.

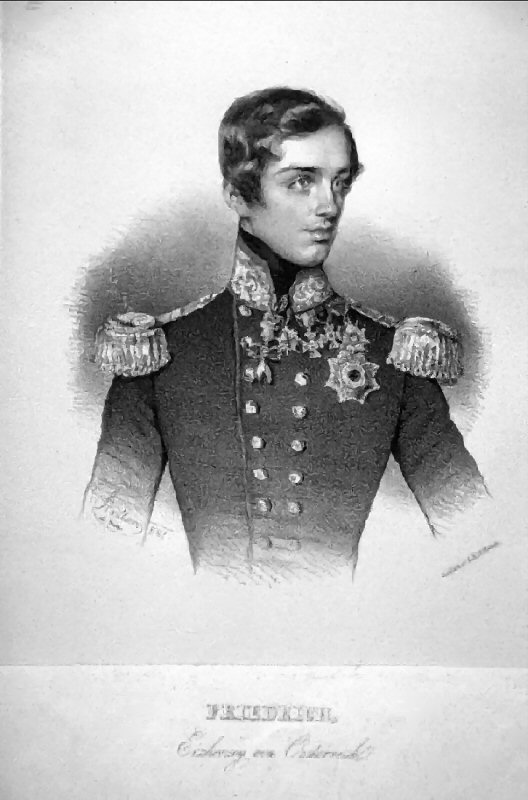
Archduke Friedrich Leopold became the youngest Commander-in-Chief of the Austrian Navy in history when he was appointed to the office at the age of 23.

During the Greek War of Independence, the Austrian Navy engaged Greek pirates who routinely attempted to attack Austrian shipping in order to help fund the Greek rebellion against Ottoman rule. During the same time period, Barbary corsairs continued to prey upon Austrian shipping in the Western Mediterranean. These two threats greatly stretched the resources of Austria's naval forces, which were still rebuilding after the Napoleonic Wars. In 1829, two Austrian corvettes, a brig, and a schooner under Lieutenant Commander (German: Korvettenkapitän) Franz Bandiera sailed Morocco's Atlantic coast to obtain the release of an Austrian merchant ship which had been captured by pirates. While the mission resulted in the return of the ship's crew, the Moroccans refused to return the ship, resulting in the Austrian bombardment of Larache. This action resulted in Morocco returning the captured Austrian ship, as well as pay damages to Vienna. The bombardment of Larache resulted in the end of North African pirates raiding Austrian shipping in the Mediterranean Sea.

By the 1830s, an attempt to modernize the Navy had begun. The Austrian government granted new funding for the construction of additional ships and the purchasing of new equipment. The most notable change which was undertaken was the incorporation of steamships, with the first such ship in the Austrian Navy, the 500-tonne (492-long-ton) paddle steamer Maria Anna, being constructed in Fiume. Maria Anna's first trials took place in 1836. In 1837, Archduke Friedrich Leopold enlisted into the Navy at the age of 16. The third son of Archduke Charles, a famous veteran of the Napoleonic Wars, Friedrich's decision to join the Navy greatly enhanced its prestige among the Austrian nobility and public, and he pursued a career enthusiastically, commanding a ship sailing to the Orient by 1839. During his time in the Navy, Friedrich introduced many modernizing reforms, aiming to make the Austrian Navy less "Venetian" in character and more "Austrian".

==== Oriental Crisis of 1840 ====
Friedrich and the Austrian Navy had their first major military encounter during the Oriental Crisis of 1840. After his victory over the Ottoman Empire during the First Egyptian-Ottoman War, Muhammad Ali of Egypt conquered large parts of Syria. In 1839, the Ottomans attempted to reclaim these territories but after a decisive defeat at the Battle of Nezib, the Ottoman Empire appeared on the verge of collapse. Through the Convention of London, the United Kingdom, Austria, Prussia, and Russia intervened to save the Ottoman Empire. The Convention offered Muhammad Ali hereditary rule of Egypt while nominally remaining part of the Ottoman Empire if he withdrew from most of Syria. Muhammad Ali hesitated to accept the offer however and in September 1840 the European powers moved to engage Muhammad Ali's forces.

The British and Austrian navies subsequently blockaded the Nile Delta and bombarded Beirut on 11 September 1840. On 26 September, Friedrich, commanding the Austrian frigate Guerriera, bombarded the port of Sidon with British support. The Austrians and British landed in the city and stormed its coastal fortifications, capturing it on 28 September. After capturing Sidon, Austria's naval squadron sailed on to Acre which bombarded the city in November, destroying its coastal fortifications and silencing the city's guns. During the storming of the city, Friedrich personally led the Austro-British landing party and hoisted the Ottoman, British, and Austrian flags over the Acre's citadel upon its capture. For his leadership during the campaign, Archduke Friedrich was awarded the Knight of the Military Order of Maria Theresa. In 1844, Archduke Friedrich was promoted to the rank of Vice-Admiral and become Commander-in-Chief of the Navy at the age of 23, but his tenure as the head of the Austrian Navy ended just three years after his appointment when he died in Venice at the age of 26.

=== Revolutions of 1848 ===
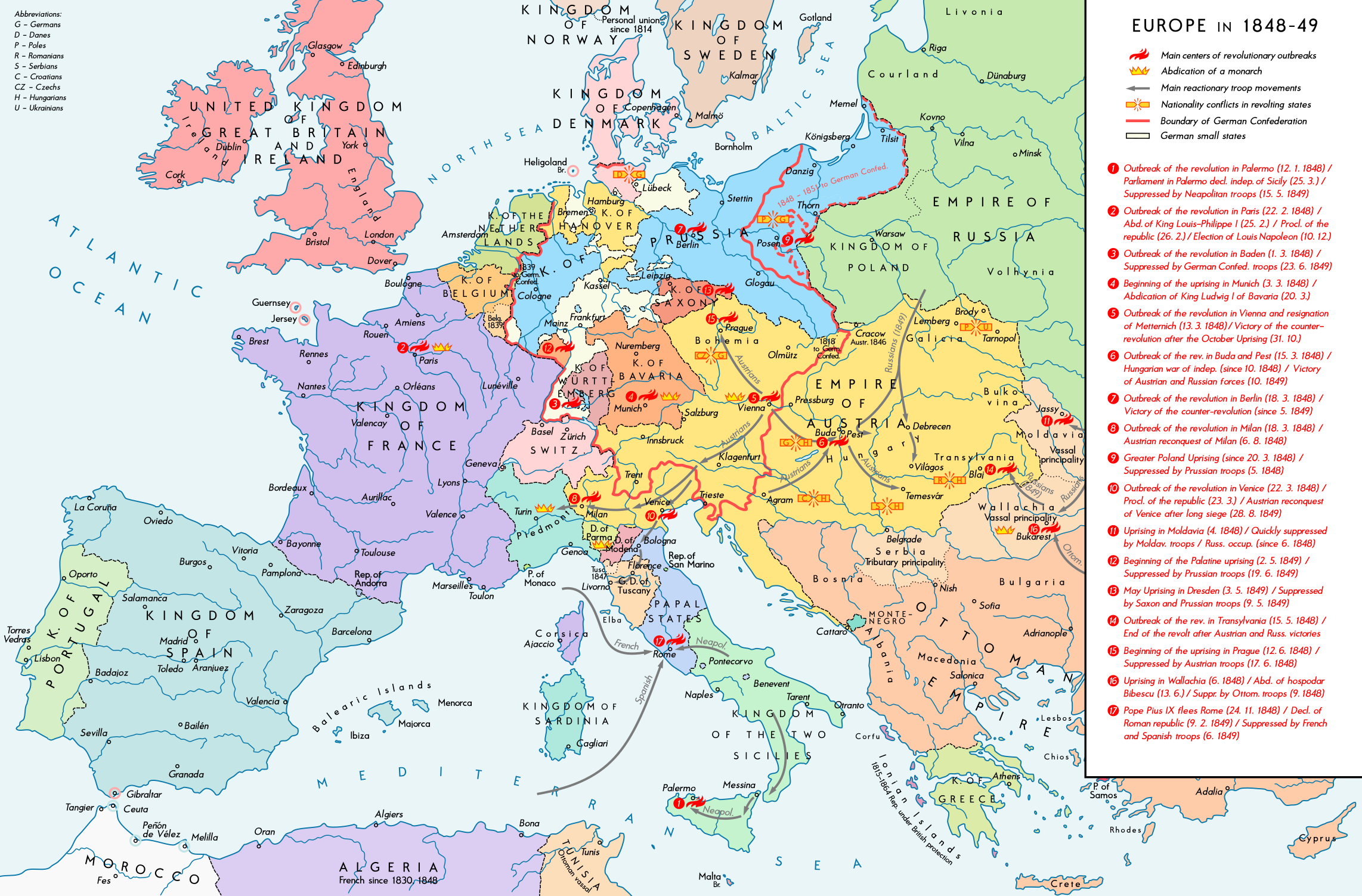
Map of Europe in 1848–1849 depicting the main revolutionary centers, important counter-revolutionary troop movements and states with abdications

After a successful revolution in France in February 1848 toppled King Louis Philippe I and established a Second French Republic, revolutionary fervor broke out across Europe. In Vienna, Austrian Chancellor Klemens von Metternich resigned his post and went into exile to London while Emperor Ferdinand I was forced to abdicate the throne in favor of his nephew, Franz Joseph. Across the Austrian Empire, nationalist sentiments among Austria's various ethnic groups led to the revolutions in Austria to take several different forms. Liberal sentiments prevailed extensively among the German Austrians, which were further complicated by the simultaneous events in the German states. The Hungarians within the Empire largely sought to establish their own independent kingdom or republic, which resulted in a revolution in Hungary. Competing national ideas in the South Hungary saw combat in the Šajkaška region, primarily populated by Serbs who served in the Danube flotila. Italians within the Austrian Empire likewise sought to unify with the other Italian-speaking states of the Italian Peninsula to form a "Kingdom of Italy".

The revolution in Vienna sparked anti-Habsburg riots in Milan and Venice. Field Marshal Joseph Radetzky was unable to defeat the Venetian and Milanese insurgents in Lombardy-Venetia, and had to order his forces to evacuate western Italy, pulling his forces back to a chain of defensive fortresses between Milan and Venice known as the Quadrilatero. With Vienna itself in the middle of an uprising against the Habsburg Monarchy, the Austrian Empire appeared on the brink of collapse. On 23 March 1848, just one day after Radetzky was forced to retreat from Milan, The Kingdom of Sardinia declared war on the Austrian Empire, sparking the First Italian War of Independence.

==== First War of Italian Independence ====
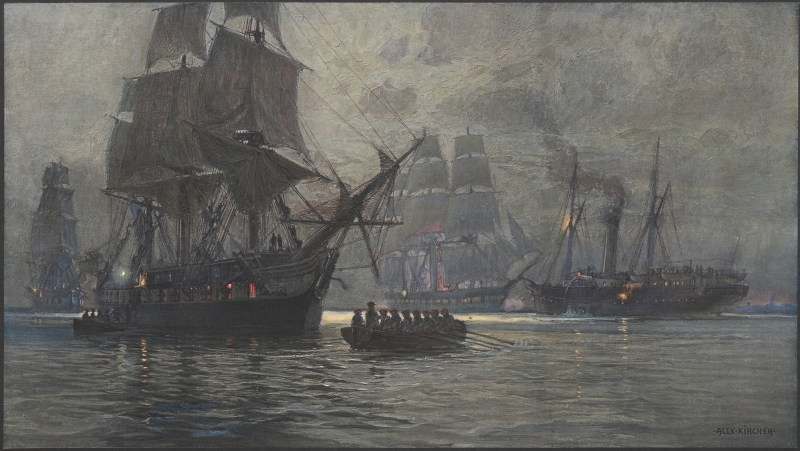
Blockade of Venice by Alexander Kircher, depicting the Austrian Navy blockading the revolutionary Republic of San Marco in 1849

Venice was at the time one of Austria's largest and most important ports, and the revolution which began there nearly led to the disintegration of the Austrian Navy. The Austrian commander of the Venetian Naval Yard was beaten to death by his own men, while the head of the city's Marine Guard was unable to provide any aid to suppress the uprising as most of the men under his command deserted. Vice-Admiral Anton von Martini, Commander-in-Chief of the Navy, attempted to put an end to the rebellion but was betrayed by his officers, the majority of whom were Venetians, and subsequently captured and held prisoner. By the end of March, the Austrian troops in Venice were forced from the city and the Austrian Navy appeared to be collapsing as many of the Austrian sailors and officers were of Italian descent. Fearing mutinies, Austrian officers ultimately relieved these Italian sailors of their duty and permitted them to return home. While this action left the Navy drastically undermanned, it prevented any wide-scale disintegration within the Navy which the Austrian Army had repeatedly suffered from in Italy.

The loss of so many Italian crew members and officers meant that the remaining ships which did not fall into rebel hands in Venice were lacking many crews. Out of roughly 5,000 men who were members of the Austrian Navy prior to the revolution, only 72 officers and 665 sailors remained. Further complicating matters for the Austrian Navy was the loss of Venice's naval dockyards, warehouses, its arsenal, as well as three corvettes and several smaller vessels to the Venetian rebels. The loss of Vice-Admiral Martini was also a blow to Austrians, as the Navy had gone through no less than four Commanders-in-Chief within three months of the death of Archduke Friedrich in late 1847. Martini's capture left the Navy without a commander for the fifth time in as many months. In the aftermath of the loss of Venice, the Austrian Navy reorganized itself under the temporary command of General Count Franz Gyulai. Gyulai recalled every Austrian ship in the Mediterranean, the Adriatic, and in the Levant. Due to Trieste's close location to the parts of Italy revolting against Austrian rule at the time, Gyulai also chose the small port of Pola as the new base for the Austrian Navy. This marked the first time the city had been used as an Austrian naval base, and from 1848 onwards the city continued to serve as a base for Austrian warships until the end of World War I. In late April, this fleet began a blockade of Venice in order to assist Austria's army currently fighting the Italian nationalists who had seized the city.

Meanwhile, fortunes continued to fade for the Austrians. The Papal States and the Kingdom of the Two Sicilies both joined the war on the side of Sardinia, the latter sending a naval force into the Adriatic in cooperation with Sardinia to help seize Venice. This Italian fleet consisted of five frigates and several smaller vessels acquired by the Italian nationalists in Venice. Against this force, the Austrian Navy counted three frigates of 44 to 50 guns, two corvettes of 18 and 20 guns, eight brigs of six to 16 guns, 34 gunboats with three guns each, and two steamers of two guns. Despite its relatively large size for navies in the Adriatic, the Austrian Navy lacked experience against the combined Italian forces and Gyulai decided to withdraw his ships to Pola. After the Austrians moved back to Trieste due to the fact that Pola's small and undeveloped dockyards could not handle the size of the Austrian fleet, a stalemate ensued in the Adriatic. The Austrian fleet was too small to go on the offensive against the Italians, while the Italian naval commander, Rear Admiral Giovanbattista Albini, was under orders not to attack the port of Trieste as its location within the German Confederation may draw in other powers in central Europe against Sardinia. Austrian efforts to purchase additional warships from the United Kingdom, Russia, the Ottoman Empire, and from Egypt, all ended in failure as the funds to purchase the ships were instead used to fight Austria's many land battles with Hungarian and Italian nationalists, as well as the war with Sardinia. Early experimentation on the use of a self-propelled explosive device—forerunner to the torpedo—to attack the Italian ships also failure due to the technological constraints of the time. Additional proposals to break the Italian fleet by using fire ships was rejected as an "inhumane" way of fighting. (Note: 16 years later, the torpedo was invented by former Austrian naval officer Giovanni Luppis and British engineer Robert Whitehead.)

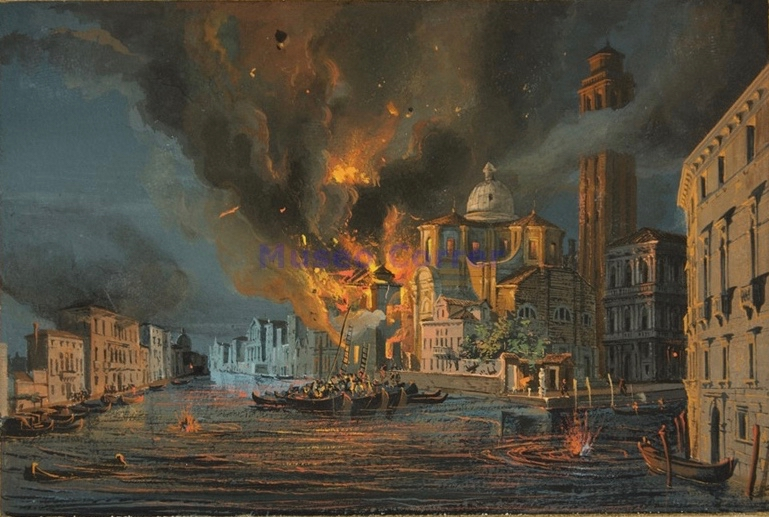
Venice under Austrian bombardment, 1849

The stalemate in the Adriatic came to an end as the Papal States and the Kingdom of the Two Sicilies pulled out of the war. Austrian reinforcements bolstered Radetzky's forces in the Italian peninsula and following the Battle of Custoza in July 1848, the tide of the war turned in Austria's favor. On 9 August, an armistice was signed between Sardinia and Austria, and a month later, Admiral Martini was released in a prisoner exchange and returned as head of the Navy. While Martini unsuccessfully lobbied for the purchase of new steam ships to re-establish a blockade of Venice, Sardinia resumed the war with Austria on 12 March 1849. This led to the disastrous Sardinian defeat at the Battle of Novara ten days later. The decisive defeat forced King Charles Albert of Sardinia to abdicate the throne of Sardinia in favor of his son Victor Emmanuel II and brought the First War of Italian Independence to an end in August 1849. Venice was the last Italian nationalist holdout to fall on 27 August 1849. (Note: The first attempt in history to conduct an aerial bombardment took place during the siege of Venice. Lieutenants Josef and Franz von Uchatius suggested that the Austrian Navy employ hot air balloons carrying bombs which would be dropped on the city. The Austrians ultimately launched some 200 incendiary balloons, each carrying a 11-to-13-kilogram (24 to 29 lb) bomb that was to be dropped from the balloon with a time fuse over the besieged city. The balloons were launched from land-based forces as well as from the Austrian warship SMS Vulcano, which acted as a balloon carrier.)

==== Aftermath and effects on the Navy ====
The Revolutions of 1848 marked a turning point in the history of the Austrian Navy. Up until that time, the Navy had been dominated by the Italian language, customs, and traditions. Prior to the revolution, the Austrian Navy was mostly made up of Italian crew members, the Italian language was the primary language, and even Italian ship names were used over German ones, such as Lipsia rather than Leipzig. Indeed, in the years before 1848, the Navy was largely considered to be a "local affair of Venice". In the years after 1848, most of the navy's officers corps hailed from the German-speaking parts of the Empire, while most of the sailors came from Istria and the Dalmatian Coast, leading to Croats, Germans, and even Hungarians to begin to be represented among the ranks of the Austrian Navy.

After retaking Venice, the Austrians acquired several warships which were under construction or already seaworthy. Most of these ships were added to the strength of the Austrian Navy, increasing the size and strength of the Navy considerably by the year 1850. In Venice the naval shipyard was retained. Here the Austrian screw-driven gunboat Kerka (crew: 100) was launched in 1860 (in service until 1908).

Naval strength of the Austrian Empire, January 1850
Type	Number	Guns	Tonnage
Frigates	4	32–42	1,200 tonnes (1,181 long tons)
Corvettes	6	20	800–900 tonnes (787–886 long tons)
Brigs	7	16	500 tonnes (492 long tons)
Miscellaneous sailing ships	10	—	—
Steamers	4	—	—

In the final months of the blockade of Venice, the Danish-born Hans Birch Dahlerup was appointed Commander-in-Chief of the Austrian Navy. Emperor Franz Joseph I selected Dahlerup due to his desire to replace Italian influence within the Navy. Dahlerup introduced many personal reforms, such as reorganizing the command structure of the Navy, establishing new service regulations, and setting up a school for naval officers. He also began the process of replacing Italian with German as the spoken de facto language of the Austrian Navy. However, Dahlerup's command style clashed heavily with the prevailing culture within the Austrian Navy and he resigned after just over two years.

=== The Ferdinand Max era ===
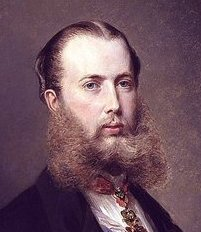
Archduke Ferdinand Maximilian of Austria served as Commander-in-Chief of the Austrian Navy throughout the 1850s and early 1860s.

After a two-year interim period in which Lieutenant General Count Franz Wimpffen commanded the Navy, in September 1854 Emperor Franz Joseph I promoted his younger brother, Archduke Ferdinand Maximilian (commonly referred to as Ferdinand Max), to the rank of Rear Admiral and named him Commander-in-Chief of the Austrian Navy. At the age of 22, Ferdinand Max became the youngest Oberkommandant in the history of the Austrian Navy, being a year younger than when Archduke Friedrich of Austria assumed command of the navy ten years earlier.

Despite his age, the fact that he had only been in the Navy for four years, and his lack of experience in battle or command on the high seas, Ferdinand Max proved to be among the most effective and successful commanders of the Austrian Navy in history. He was described by Lawrence Sondhaus in his book The Habsburg Empire and the Sea: Austrian Naval Policy, 1797–1866 as "the most gifted leader the navy had ever had, or ever would have". Anthony Sokol describes Ferdinand Max in his book The Imperial and Royal Austro-Hungarian Navy as "one of the most talented of the Habsburg princes...He used his prestige, youthful enthusiasm, and love of the Service to promote it in every way possible."

Ferdinand Max worked hard to separate the Austrian Navy from its dependence upon the Austrian Army, which had nominal control over its affairs. On 14 January 1862, Franz Joseph I agreed to establish the Ministry of Marine, which oversaw the affairs of both the Austrian Navy, and the Austrian merchant marine, and named Count Matthias von Wickenburg its head. Under this new system, Ferdinand Max continued to be the Oberkommandant, but he was no longer responsible for the political management of the fleet. In addition to obtaining support for the creation of Ministry of Marine, Ferdinand Max was given great freedom by the Emperor to manage the navy as he saw fit, especially with respect to the construction and acquisition of new warships.

==== Development of the Austrian Navy: 1854–1860 ====
Ferdinand Max immediately went to work expanding the Austrian Navy. Fears of over-dependence upon foreign shipyards to supply Austrian warships enabled him to convince his brother to authorize the construction of a new drydock at Pola, and the expansion of existing shipyards in Trieste. Furthermore, Ferdinand Max initiated an ambitious construction program in the ports of Pola, Trieste, and Venice, the largest the Adriatic had seen since the Napoleonic Wars. Pola in particular saw a considerable amount of attention as its natural harbor and strategic location along the Adriatic coastline of Austria enabled ships docked there to provide protection for Trieste as well as the Dalmatian Coast. While it had been used as a base for the Navy during the Revolutions of 1848, the small dockyards and port facilities, coupled with surrounding swampland had hindered its development. In addition to Pola's new drydock, Ferdinand Max had the swamps drained and constructed a new arsenal for the city.

By 1855, a screw-powered ship-of-the-line was under construction in Pola after failed bids to construct the ship with British and American shipbuilding firms, while two screw-frigates and two screw-corvettes were being built in Trieste and Venice respectively. Within a year of Ferdinand Max's promotion to Oberkommandant, the Austrian Navy consisted of four frigates, four corvettes, and two paddle steamers in active service in the Mediterranean Sea. Ferdinand Max followed up on this progress however by purchasing the steam frigate Radetzky from the United Kingdom in 1856. Her design was used for the construction of future ships of the Navy, and marked the beginning of Austria's modern shipbuilding industry. From 1856 onward, a majority of Austria's ships were constructed by domestic shipyards. Ferdinand Max's next construction project was the last Austrian ship-of-the-line, Kaiser. She was commissioned into the Austrian Navy in 1859 after being constructed at the newly built Pola Navy Yard between 1855 and 1858.

As a result of these construction projects, the Austrian Navy grew to its largest size since the War of Austrian Succession over 100 years prior. Despite these efforts however, the Navy was still considerably smaller than its French, British, or Sardinian counterparts. Indeed, the Austrian Navy was still attempting to catch up to the technological developments which had emerged during the first half of the 19th century with respect to steam power, when the emergence of the French iron-platted floating battery Dévastation gained international attention following its use during the Crimean War in October 1855. Dévastation signalled the beginning of the emergence of ironclad warships over the course of the next decade.

Indeed, the French Navy's technological and numerical edge proved to be decisive in driving the Austrian Navy to port shortly after the outbreak of the Second War of Italian Independence. After the failure of the First Italian War of Independence, Sardinia began the search for potential allies. Sardinian Prime Minister Camillo Benso, Count of Cavour, found French Emperor Napoleon III supportive of an alliance with Sardinia following the Crimean War, in which France and Sardinia were allies against the Russian Empire. After the Plombières Agreement of 1858, Napoleon III and Cavour signed a secret treaty of alliance against Austria whereby France would assist Sardinia in return for Nice and Savoy being ceded to France. During the first half of 1859, the Franco-Sardinian forces quickly defeated the Austrians on land, culminating in the Battle of Solferino, while the French Navy blockaded the Adriatic Sea and forced the Austrian Navy to remain in port, preventing its use for the duration of the war. After the defeat at Solferino, Austria ceded most of Lombardy and the city of Milan to France under the Treaty of Zürich, who transferred it to Sardinia in exchange for Savoy and Nice.

In response to Austria's quick defeat during the Second War of Italian Independence, Ferdinand Max proposed an even larger naval construction program than the one he had initiated upon his appointment as Oberkommandant. This fleet would be large enough not only to show the Austrian flag around the world, but also to protect its merchant marine as well as thwart any Adriatic ambitions from the growing Kingdom of Sardinia. However, constitutional reforms enacted in Austria after the defeat, as well as the recent introduction of ironclads into the navies of the world, made the proposal more expensive than he had initially intended. While the Archduke had previously been given free rein over naval affairs, and had enjoyed an unprecedented allocation of new funds to complete his various expansion and modernization projects, Austria's recent military defeats and financial difficulties in the immediate aftermath of the war stalled his plans for further construction projects. Despite these obstacles, the initiation of the Italian ironclad program between 1860 and 1861, coupled with Austrian fears of an Italian invasion or seaborne landing directed against Venice, Trieste, Istria, and the Dalmatian Coast, necessitated an Austrian naval response to counter the growing strength of the Italian Regia Marina.

==== The Austro-Italian ironclad arms race ====
The Austrian ironclad Drache, lead ship of the Drache class. She and her sister ship Salamander were Austria's first ironclad warships and were intended to counter Italy's own ironclad program.

After the Second War of Italian Independence, Sardinia ordered two small ironclads from France in 1860. While these ships were under construction, the Italian revolutionary Giuseppe Garibaldi began his campaign to conquer Southern Italy in the name of the Kingdom of Sardinia. He quickly toppled the Kingdom of the Two Sicilies, the largest state in the region in a matter of months. On 17 March 1861, Victor Emmanuel II was proclaimed King of Italy. With the unification of Italy, the various navies of the former Italian states were merged into a single military force, named the Regia Marina (Royal Navy). By the time the two Formidabile-class ironclads had been commissioned, they formed the first broadside ironclads of the Italian Regia Marina.

Following up on these ships, Italy launched a substantial program to bolster the strength of the Regia Marina. The Italians believed that building a strong navy would play a crucial role in making the recently unified kingdom a Great Power. These actions captured the attention of the Austrian Empire, which viewed Italy with great suspicion and worry, as irredentist claims by Italian nationalists were directed at key Austrian territories such as Venice, Trentino, and Trieste. In response to the growing strength of the Regia Marina, the Imperial Austrian Navy subsequently ordered two Drache-class ironclads in 1860. In the years immediately after the unification of Italy, Austria and Italy engaged in a naval arms race centered upon the construction and acquisition of ironclads. This arms race between the two nations continued for the rest of Ferdinand Max's tenure as Oberkommandant.

==== Novara Expedition ====
Archduke Ferdinand Maximilian also initiated a large-scale scientific expedition (1857–1859) during which the frigate SMS Novara became the first Austrian warship to circumnavigate the globe. The journey lasted 2 years and 3 months and was accomplished under the command of Kommodore Bernhard von Wüllerstorf-Urbair, with 345 officers and crew, and 7 scientists aboard. The expedition was planned by the Imperial Academy of Sciences in Vienna and aimed to gain new knowledge in the disciplines of astronomy, botany, zoology, geology, oceanography and hydrography. SMS Novara sailed from Trieste on 30 April 1857, visiting Gibraltar, Madeira, Rio de Janeiro, Cape Town, St. Paul Island, Ceylon, Madras, Nicobar Islands, Singapore, Batavia, Manila, Hong Kong, Shanghai, Puynipet Island, Stuarts, Sydney (5 November 1858), Auckland, Tahiti, Valparaíso and Gravosa before returning to Trieste on 30 August 1859.

In 1863 the Royal Navy's battleship HMS Marlborough, the flagship of Admiral Charles Fremantle, made a courtesy visit to Pola, the main port of the Austro-Hungarian Navy.

In April 1864 Archduke Ferdinand Maximilian stepped down as Commander-in-Chief of the Navy and accepted the throne of Mexico from Louis Napoleon, becoming Maximilian I of Mexico. He traveled from Trieste to Veracruz aboard the SMS Novara, escorted by the frigates SMS Bellona (Austrian) and Thémis (French), and the Imperial yacht Phantasie led the warship procession from his palace at Schloß Miramar out to sea. When he was arrested and executed four years later, admiral Wilhelm von Tegetthoff was sent aboard the Novara to take Ferdinand Maximilian's body back to Austria.

==== Second Schleswig War ====
The Second Schleswig War was the 1864 invasion of Schleswig-Holstein by Prussia and Austria. At that time, The duchies were part of the Kingdom of Denmark. Rear-Admiral Wilhelm von Tegetthoff commanded a small Austrian flotilla which traveled from the Mediterranean Sea to the North Sea.

On May 9, 1864, Tegetthoff commanded the Austrian naval forces in the naval action off Heligoland from his flagship, the screw-driven SMS Schwarzenberg. The action was a tactical victory for the Danish forces. However, in strategic sense the Austro-Prussian fleet succeed breaking the Danish blockade. It was also the last significant naval action fought by squadrons of wooden ships and the last significant naval action involving Denmark.

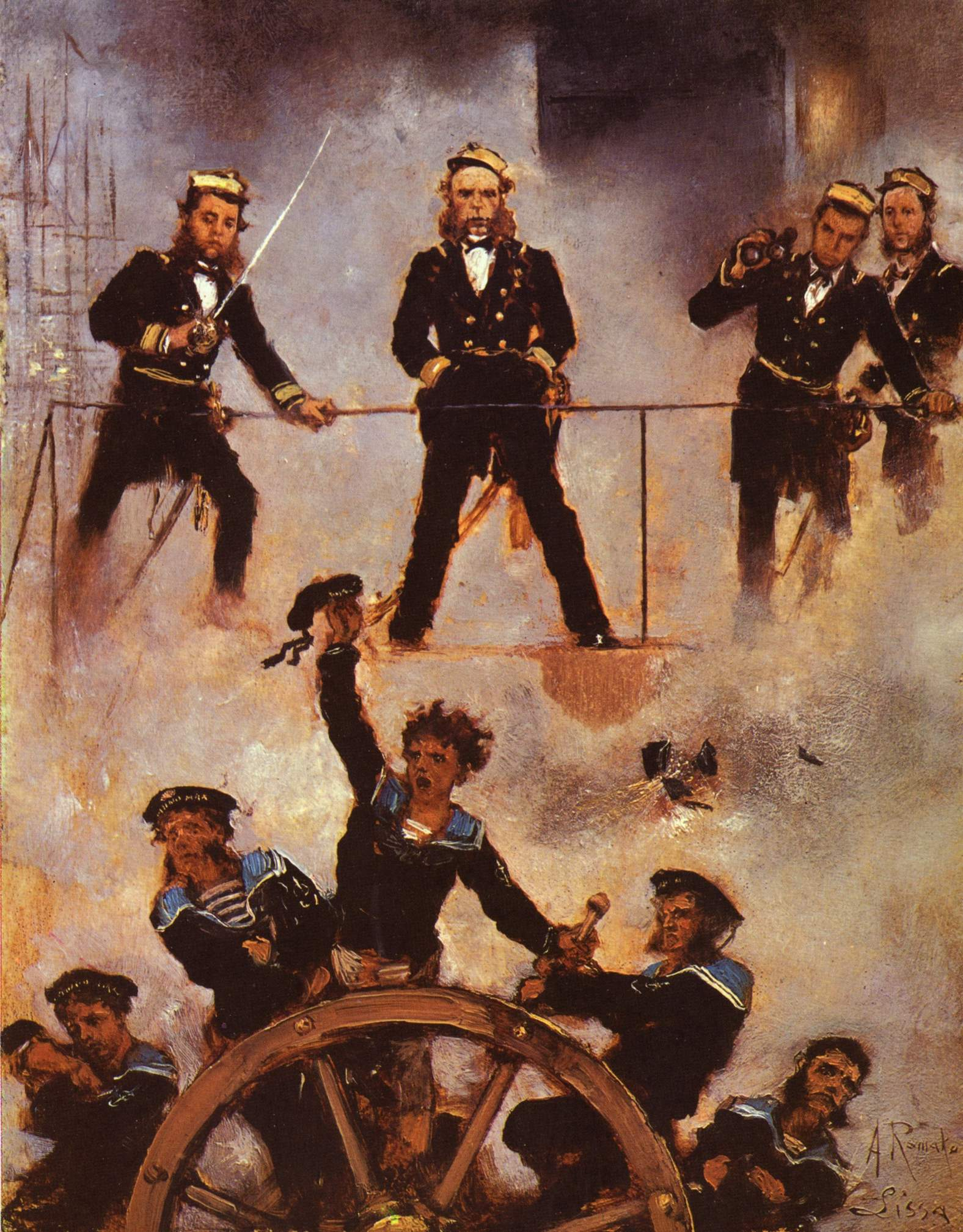
Tegetthoff (centre) at the Battle of Lissa, painting by Anton Romako, 1880

==== Third Italian War of Independence ====
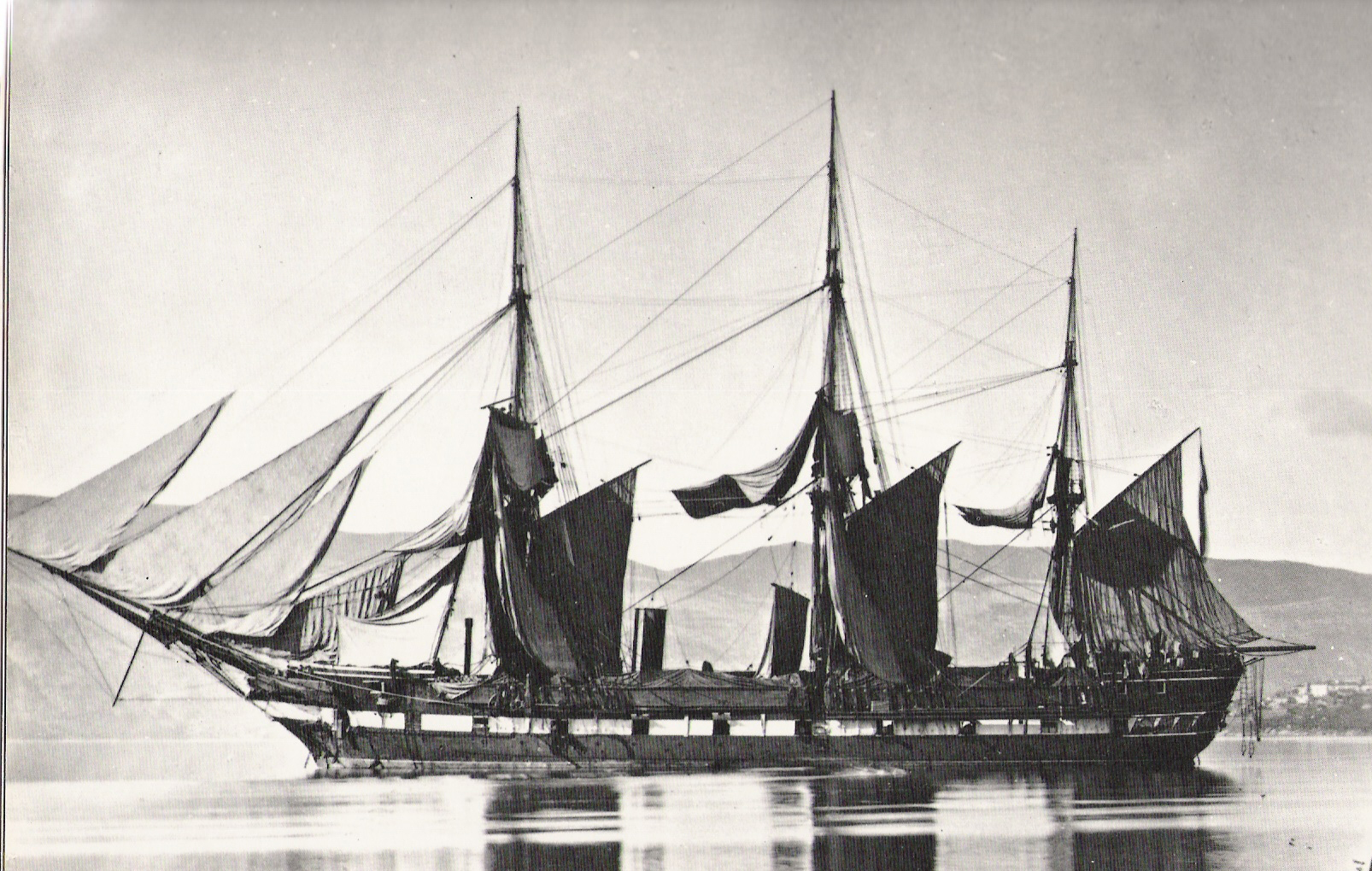
Screw-driven corvette Erzherzog Friedrich in 1868, a veteran of the Battle of Lissa

On 20 July 1866, near the island of Vis (Lissa) in the Adriatic, the Austrian fleet, under the command of Rear-Admiral Wilhelm von Tegetthoff, made its name in the modern era at the Battle of Lissa during the Third Italian War of Independence. The battle pitted Austrian naval forces against the naval forces of the newly created Kingdom of Italy. It was a decisive victory for an outnumbered Austrian over a superior Italian force, and was the first major European sea battle involving ships using iron and steam, and one of the last to involve large wooden battleships and deliberate ramming.

==== Peacetime ====
In 1873 the new sail and steam frigate SMS Laudon (crew 480) was added to the fleet, which took part in the International Naval Review off Gruž in 1880.

During peacetime, Austrian ships visited Asia, North America, South America, and the Pacific Ocean.

In 1869 Emperor Franz Joseph travelled on board the screw-driven corvette SMS Viribus Unitis (not to be confused with the later battleship of the same name) to the opening of the Suez Canal. The ship had been named after his personal motto.

==== Polar Expedition ====
Austro-Hungarian ships and naval personnel were also involved in Arctic exploration, discovering Franz Josef Land during an expedition which lasted from 1872 to 1874.

Led by the naval officer Karl Weyprecht and the infantry officer and landscape artist Julius Payer, the custom-built schooner Tegetthoff left Tromsø in July 1872. At the end of August, she got locked in pack-ice north of Novaya Zemlya and drifted to hitherto unknown polar regions. It was on this drift when the explorers discovered an archipelago which they named after Emperor Franz Joseph I.

In May 1874 Payer decided to abandon the ice-locked ship and try to return by sledges and boats. On 14 August 1874 the expedition reached the open sea and on 3 September finally set foot on Russian mainland.

=== Between the centuries ===
==== Crete Rebellion ====
In late 1896 a rebellion broke out on Crete, and on 21 January 1897 a Greek army landed in Crete to liberate the island from the Ottoman Empire and unite it with Greece. The European powers, including Austria-Hungary, intervened, and proclaimed Crete an international protectorate. Warships of the k.u.k. Kriegsmarine patrolled the waters off Crete in blockade of Ottoman naval forces. Crete remained in an anomalous position until finally ceded to Greece in 1913.

==== The Boxer Rebellion ====
Austria-Hungary was part of the Eight-Nation Alliance during the Boxer Rebellion in China (1899–1901). As a member of the Allied nations, Austria sent two training ships and the cruisers SMS Kaiserin und Königin Maria Theresia, SMS Kaiserin Elisabeth, SMS Aspern, and SMS Zenta and a company of marines to the North China coast in April 1900, based at the Russia concession of Port Arthur.

In June they helped hold the Tianjin railway against Boxer forces, and also fired upon several armed junks on the Hai River near Tong-Tcheou. They also took part in the seizure of the Taku Forts commanding the approaches to Tianjin, and the boarding and capture of four Chinese destroyers by Capt. Roger Keyes of HMS Fame. In all k.u.k. forces suffered few casualties during the rebellion.

After the uprising, a cruiser was maintained permanently on the China station, and a detachment of marines was deployed at the embassy in Beijing.

Lieutenant Georg Ludwig von Trapp, who served as a submarine commander during World War I and became famous in the musical The Sound of Music after World War II, was decorated for bravery aboard SMS Kaiserin und Königin Maria Theresia during the Rebellion.

==== Montenegro ====
During the First Balkan War Austria-Hungary joined Germany, France, the United Kingdom and Italy in blockading the seaport town of Bar (Antivari) in the Kingdom of Montenegro.

==== European naval arms race ====
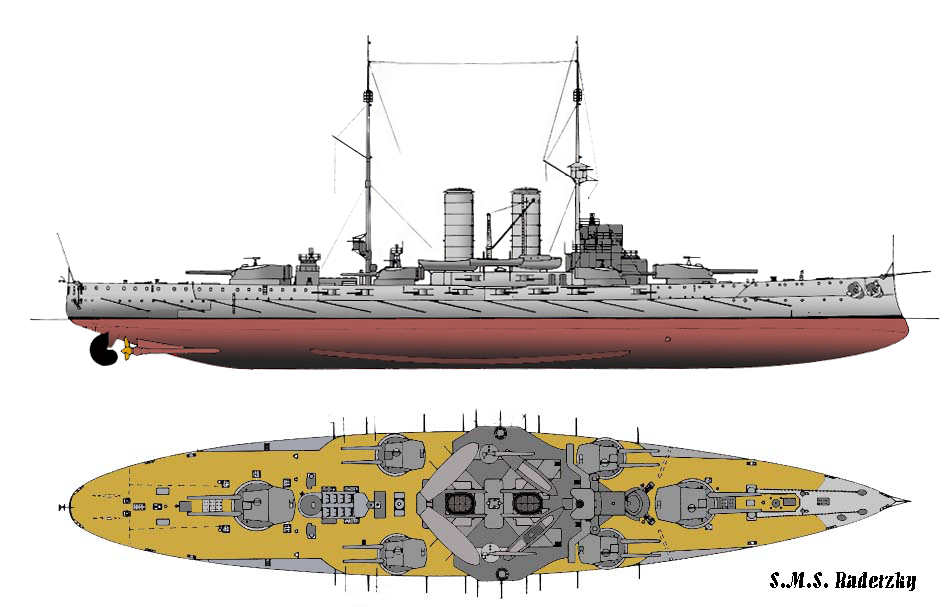
Scale drawing of a Radetzky-class semi-dreadnought.

Among the many factors giving rise to World War I was the naval arms race between the British Empire and Imperial Germany. Germany enhanced her naval infrastructure, building new dry docks, and enlarging the Kiel Canal to enable larger vessels to navigate it. However, that was not the only European naval arms race. Imperial Russia too had commenced building a new modern navy following their naval defeat in the Russo-Japanese War. The Austro-Hungarian Empire and the Kingdom of Italy were in a race of their own for domination of the Adriatic Sea. The k.u.k. Kriegsmarine had another prominent supporter at that time in the face of the Archduke Franz Ferdinand. Like other imperial naval enthusiasts before him, Franz Ferdinand had a keen private interest in the fleet and was an energetic campaigner for naval matters.

==== The dreadnought era ====
In 1906 Britain completed the battleship HMS Dreadnought, and it was so advanced that some argued that this rendered all previous battleships obsolete, although Britain and other countries kept pre-dreadnoughts in service.

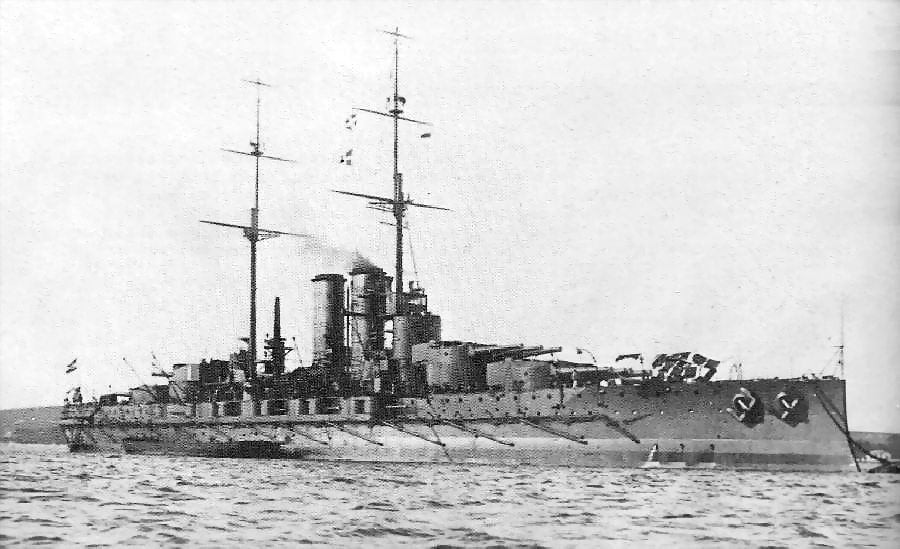
Dreadnought SMS Tegetthoff, named after Admiral von Tegetthoff

Austria-Hungary's naval architects, aware of the inevitable dominance of all big gun dreadnought type designs, then presented their case to the Marinesektion des Reichskriegsministeriums (Naval Section at the War Ministry) in Vienna, which on 5 October 1908 ordered the construction of their own dreadnought, the first contract being awarded to 'Werft das Stabilimento Tecnico Triestino (STT)', the naval weaponry to be provided by the Škoda Works in Plzeň. The Marine budget for 1910 was substantially enlarged to permit major refits of the existing fleet and more dreadnoughts. The battleships SMS Tegetthoff and SMS Viribus Unitis were both launched by the Archduke Franz Ferdinand at Trieste, amongst great rejoicing, on 24 June 1911, and 21 March 1912 respectively. They were followed by SMS Prinz Eugen, and SMS Szent István. These battleships, constructed later than many of the earlier British and German dreadnoughts, were considerably ahead in some aspects of design, especially of both the French and Italian navies, and were constructed with Marconi wireless rooms as well as anti-aircraft armaments. It has been claimed they were the first battleships in the world equipped with torpedo launchers built into their bows.

Between 22 and 28 May 1914 Tegetthoff, accompanied by Viribus Unitis, made a courtesy visit to the British Mediterranean fleet in Malta.

==== Submarine fleet ====
In 1904, after allowing the navies of other countries to pioneer submarine developments, the Austro-Hungarian Navy ordered the Austrian Naval Technical Committee (MTK) to produce a submarine design. The January 1905 design developed by the MTK and other designs submitted by the public as part of a design competition were all rejected by the Navy as impracticable. They instead opted to order two submarines each of designs by Simon Lake, Germaniawerft, and John Philip Holland for a competitive evaluation. The two Germaniawerft submarines comprised the U-3 class. The Navy authorized two boats, U-3 and U-4, from the Germaniawerft in 1906.

The U-3-class was an improved version of Germaniawerft's design for the Imperial German Navy's first U-boat, U-1, and featured a double hull with internal saddle tanks. The Germaniawerft engineers refined the design's hull shape through extensive model trials.

U-3 and U-4 were both laid down on 12 March 1907 at Germaniawerft in Kiel and were launched in August and November 1908, respectively. After completion, each was towed to Pola via Gibraltar, with U-3 arriving in January 1909 and U-4 arriving in April.

The U-5 class was built to the same design as the C-class for the US Navy and was built by Whitehead & Co. under license from Holland and his company, Electric Boat. Components for the first two Austrian boats were manufactured by the Electric Boat Company and assembled at Fiume, while the third boat was a speculative private venture by Whitehead that failed to find a buyer and was purchased by Austria-Hungary upon the outbreak of World War I.

The U-5-class boats had a single-hulled design with a teardrop shape that bore a strong resemblance to modern nuclear submarines. The boats were just over 105 feet (32 m) long and displaced 240 tonnes (260 short tons) surfaced, and 273 tonnes (301 short tons) submerged. The torpedo tubes featured unique, cloverleaf-shaped design hatches that rotated on a central axis. The ships were powered by twin 6-cylinder gasoline engines while surfaced, but suffered from inadequate ventilation which resulted in frequent intoxication of the crew. While submerged, they were propelled by twin electric motors. Three boats were built in the class: U-5, U-6, and U-12.

=== World War I ===
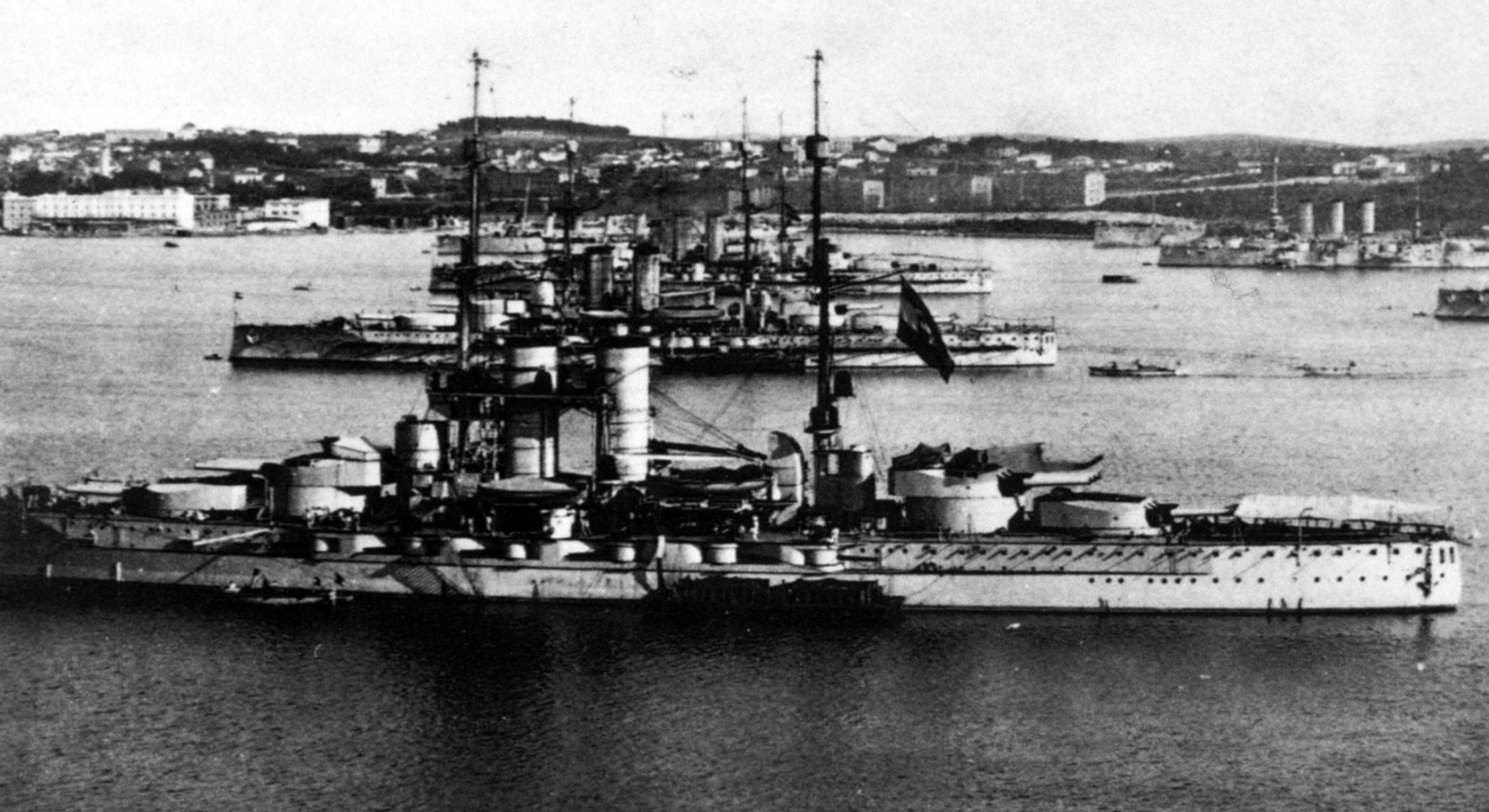
Austro-Hungarian dreadnoughts at Pola

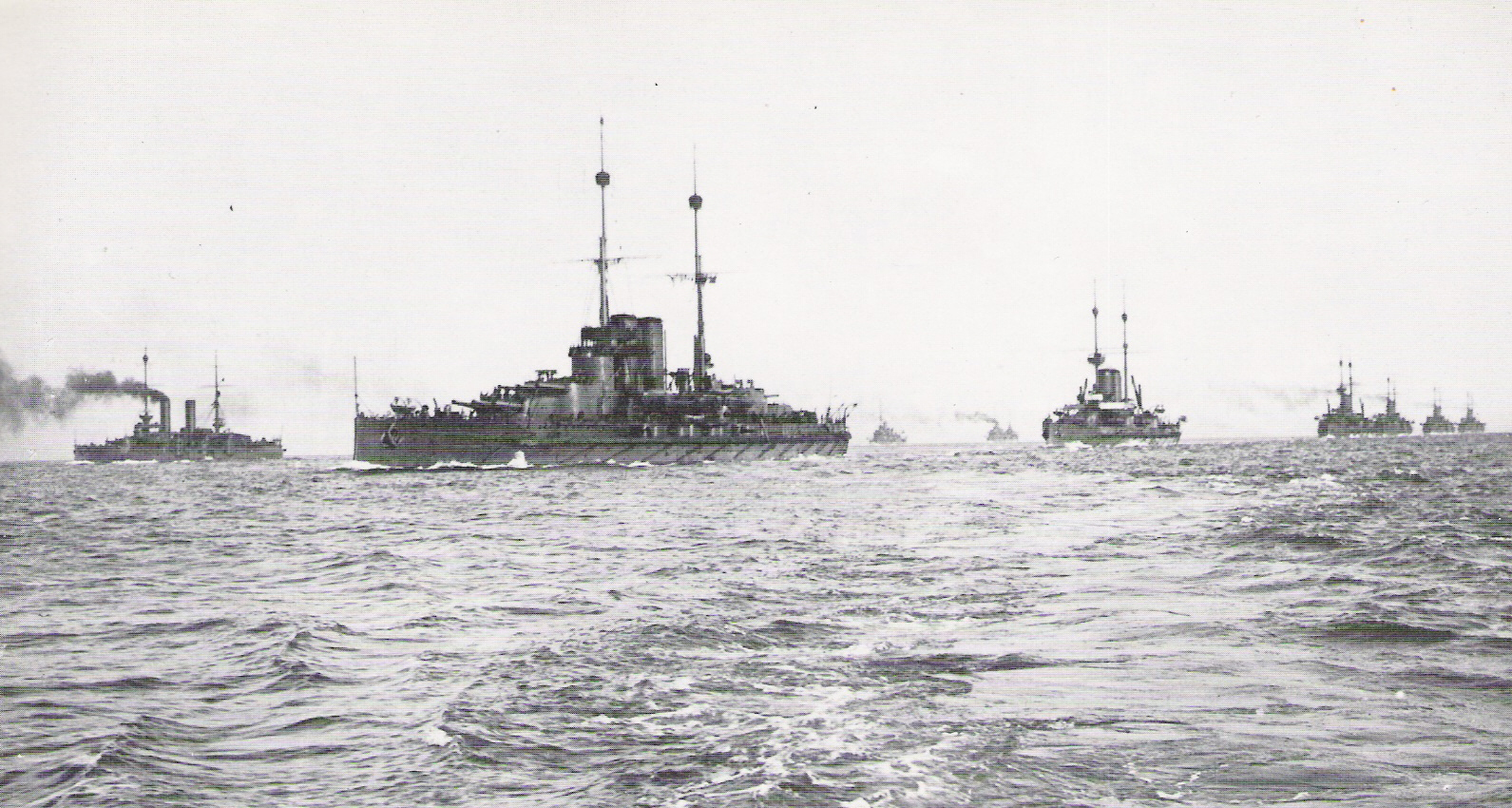
Austro-Hungarian fleet manoeuvres in February 1913

Austro-Hungarian Naval Budget: 1901–1914
(in millions of Austro-Hungarian krone)

After the assassination of Archduke Franz Ferdinand and his wife in 1914, the Austro-Hungarian Navy honoured them with a lying in state aboard SMS Viribus Unitis.

During the First World War, the navy saw some action, but prior to the Italian entry spent much of its time in its major naval base at Pola, except for small skirmishes. Following the Italian declaration of war the mere fact of its existence tied up the Italian Navy and the French Navy in the Mediterranean for the duration of the war.

Following the declaration of war in August 1914, the French and Montenegrin forces attempted to cause havoc at Cattaro, KuK Kriegsmarine's southernmost base in the Adriatic. Throughout September, October and November 1914 the navy bombarded the Allied forces resulting in a decisive defeat for the latter, and again in January 1916 in what was called the Battle of Lovćen, which was instrumental in Montenegro being knocked out of the war early.

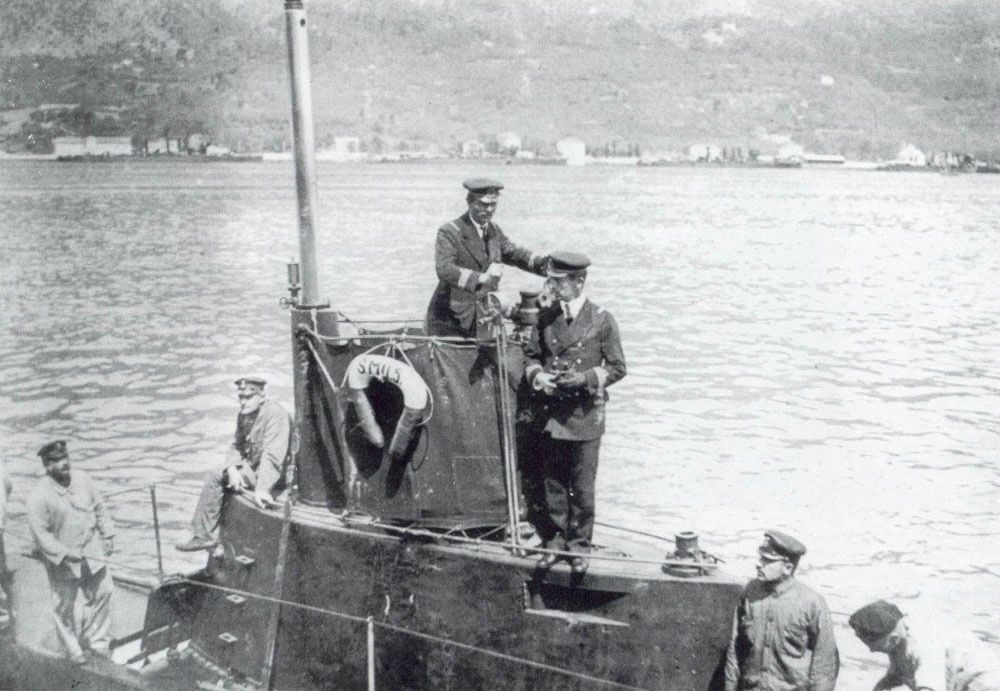
Linienschiffsleutnant von Trapp on the bridge of U-5

On 23 May 1915, when Italy declared war on Austria-Hungary, the Austro-Hungarian Navy left their harbors in Pola (today Pula, Croatia), Sebenico (today Šibenik, Croatia) and Cattaro (today Kotor, Montenegro) to bombard the eastern Italian coast between Venice and Barletta. Main targets were the cities of Ancona, Rimini, Vieste, Manfredonia, Barletta and bridges and railway tracks along the coast. Until 1917 the Austro-Hungarian fleet was as yet largely undamaged.

The presence of three Allied navies in the Mediterranean made any measures of their co-ordination and common doctrine extraordinarily difficult. The Mediterranean was divided into eleven zones, of which the British naval authorities were responsible for four, the French for four, and the Italians for three. Differing command structures, national pride and the language barrier all contributed to a lack of cohesion in the application of Allied sea power, producing a situation in which German and Austro-Hungarian U-boat attacks on shipping flourished.

==== Battle at Durazzo ====
In December 1915 a k.u.k. Kriegsmarine cruiser squadron attempted to make a raid on the Serbian troops evacuating Albania. After sinking a French submarine and bombarding the town of Durazzo the squadron ran into a minefield, sinking one destroyer and damaging another. The next day the group ran into a squadron of British, French, and Italian cruisers and destroyers. The resulting battle left two Austro-Hungarian destroyers sunk and inflicted light damage upon another, while dealing only minor damage to the Allied cruisers and destroyers present.

A three-power conference on 28 April 1917, at Corfu, discussed a more offensive strategy in the Adriatic, but the Italians were not prepared to consider any big ship operations, considering the size of the Austro-Hungarian fleet. The British and French seemed reluctant to move alone against the Austro-Hungarians, especially if it meant a full-scale battle. But the Austrians were not inactive either, and even as the Allied conference was in session they were planning an offensive operation against the Otranto Barrage.

==== Battle of the Otranto Straits ====
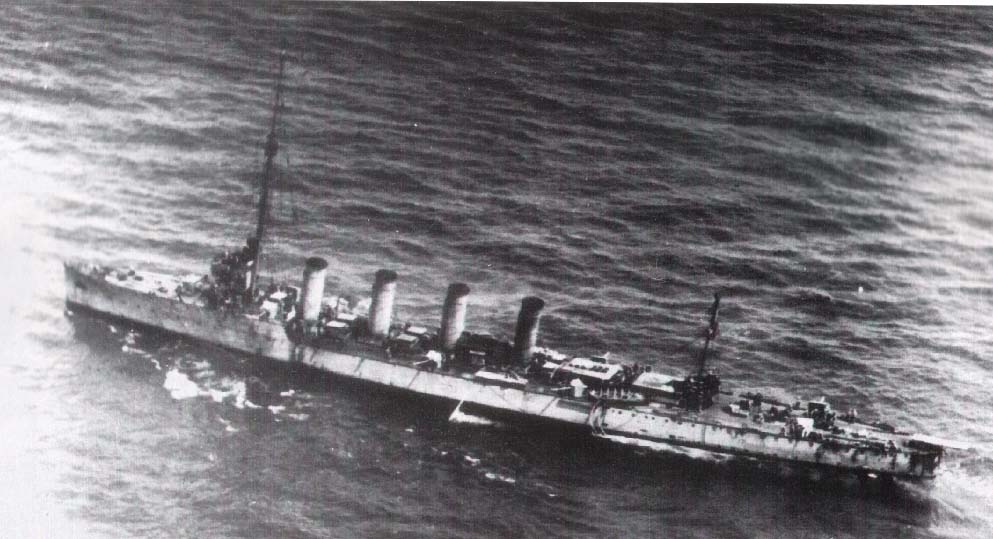
SMS Novara after the Battle of Otranto Straits

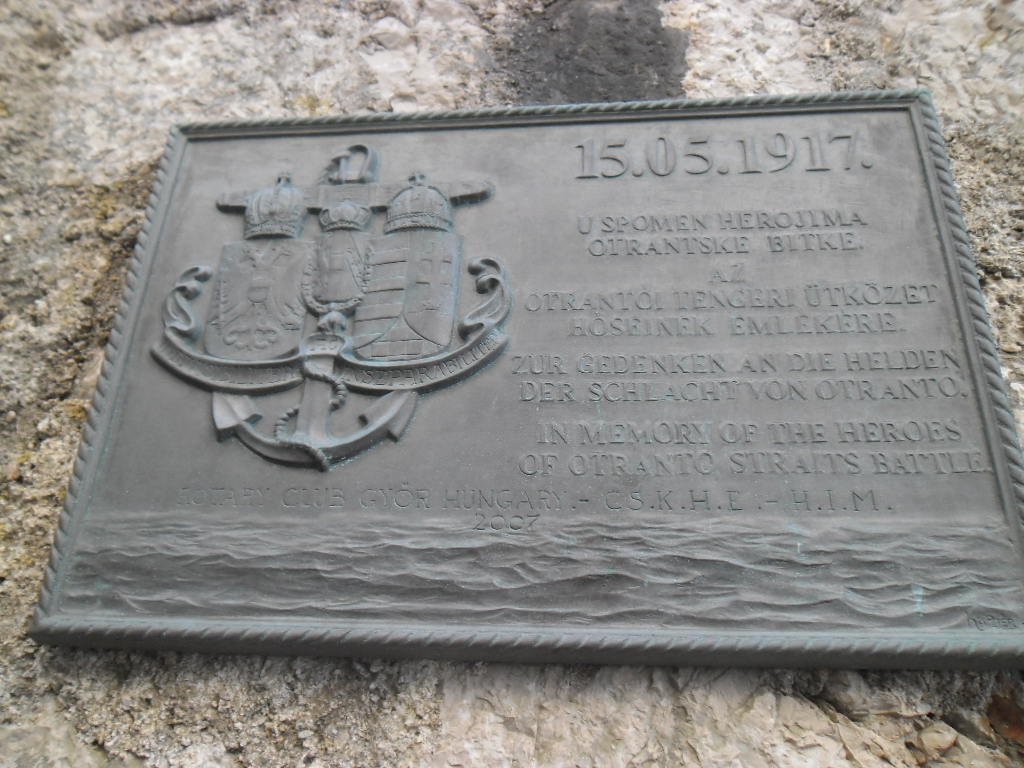
Monument for the "Heroes of Otranto Battle" on the Prevlaka in Croatia

Throughout 1917 the Adriatic remained the key to the U-boat war on shipping in the Mediterranean. Cattaro, some 140 miles above the narrow Straits of Otranto, was the main U-boat base from which almost the entire threat to Mediterranean shipping came.

The Otranto Barrage, constructed by the Allies with up to 120 naval drifters, used to deploy and patrol submarine nets, and 30 motor launches, all equipped with depth charges, was designed to stop the passage of U-boats from Cattaro. However, this failed to do so, and from its inception in 1916, the barrage had caught only two U-boats, the Austrian U-6 and the German UB-44 out of hundreds of possible passages.

However, the barrage effectively meant that the Austro-Hungarian surface fleet could not leave the Adriatic Sea unless it was willing to give battle to the blocking forces. This, and as the war drew on bringing supply difficulties especially coal, plus a fear of mines, limited the Austro-Hungarian navy to shelling the Italian and Serbian coastlines.

There had already been four small-scale Austro-Hungarian attacks on the barrage, on 11 March, 21 and 25 April and 5 May 1917, but none of them amounted to anything. Now greater preparations were made, with two U-boats despatched to lay mines off Brindisi with a third patrolling the exits in case Anglo-Italian forces were drawn out during the attack. The whole operation was timed for the night of 14/15 May, which led to the biggest battle of the Austro-Hungarian navy in World War I, the Battle of the Otranto Straits.

The first Austro-Hungarian warships to strike were the two destroyers, SMS Csepel and SMS Balaton. An Italian convoy of three ships, escorted by the destroyer Borea, was approaching Valona, when, out of the darkness, the Austrians fell upon them. Borea was left sinking. Of the three merchant ships, one loaded with ammunition was hit and blown up, a second set on fire, and the third hit. The two Austrian destroyers then steamed off northward.

Meanwhile, three Austro-Hungarian cruisers under the overall command of Captain Miklós Horthy, SMS Novara, SMS Saida, and SMS Helgoland, had actually passed a patrol of four French destroyers north of the barrage, and thought to be friendly ships passed unchallenged. They then sailed through the barrage before turning back to attack it. Each Austrian cruiser took one-third of the line and began slowly and systematically to destroy the barrage with their 100mm (3.9") guns, urging all Allies on board to abandon their ships first.

During this battle the Allies lost two destroyers, 14 drifters and one glider while the Austro-Hungarian navy suffered only minor damage (Novara's steam supply pipes were damaged by a shell) and few losses. The Austro-Hungarian navy returned to its bases up north in order to repair and re-supply, and the allies had to rebuild the blockade.

==== Cattaro mutiny ====
In February 1918 a mutiny started in the 5th Fleet stationed at the Gulf of Cattaro naval base. Sailors on up to 40 ships joined the mutiny over demands for better treatment and a call to end the war.

The mutiny failed to spread beyond Cattaro, and within three days a loyal naval squadron had arrived. Together with coastal artillery the squadron fired several shells into a few of the rebel's ships, and then assaulted them with Marine Infantry in a short and successful skirmish. About 800 sailors were imprisoned, dozens were court-martialed, and four seamen were executed, including the leader of the uprising, Franz Rasch, a Bohemian. Given the huge crews required in naval vessels of that time, this is an indication that the mutiny was limited to a minority.

==== Late World War I ====
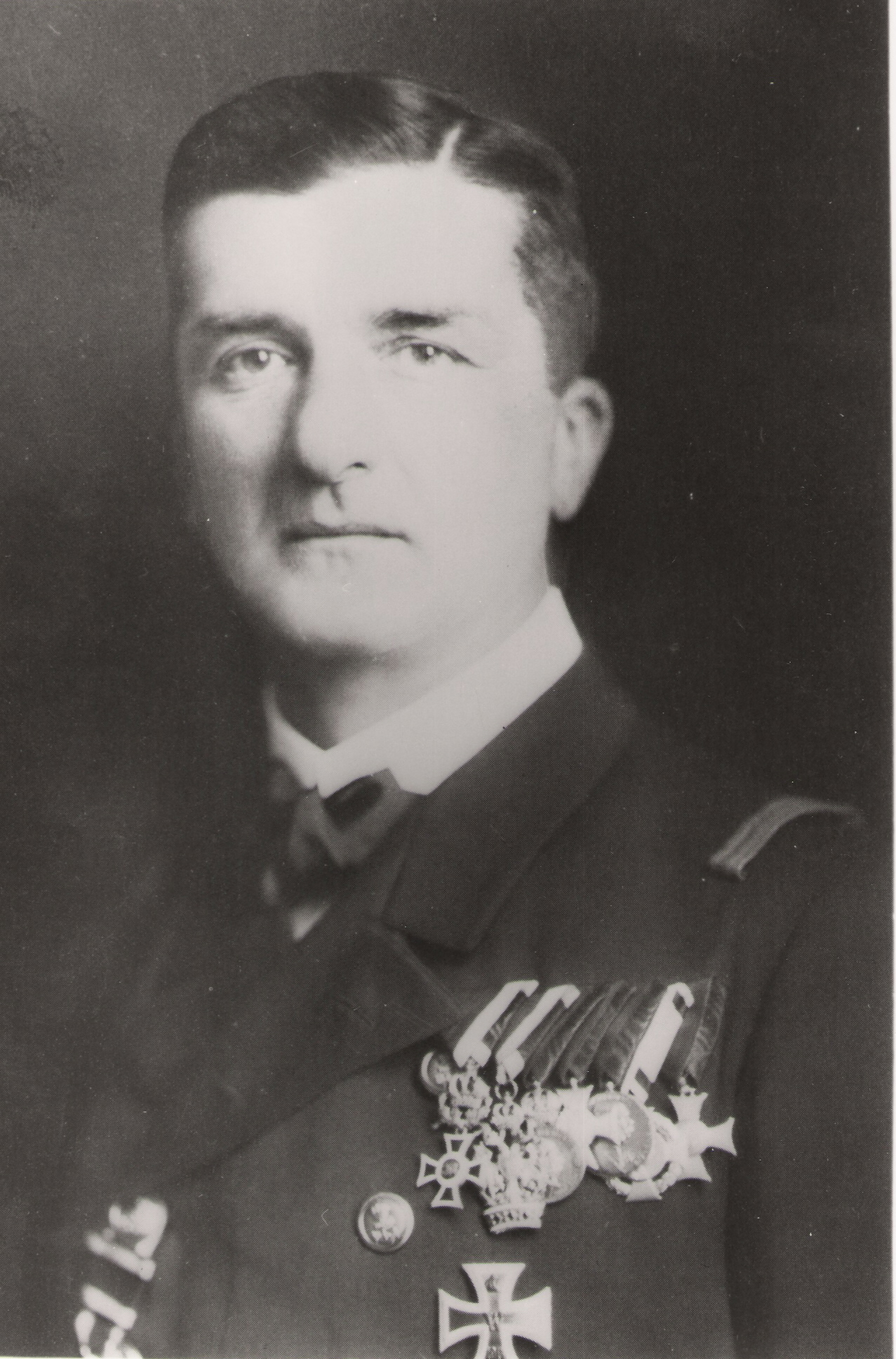
Admiral Miklós Horthy

A second attempt to force the blockade took place in June 1918 under the command of Rear Admiral Horthy. A surprise attack was planned, but the mission was doomed when the fleet was by chance spotted by an Italian MAS boat patrol, commanded by Luigi Rizzo, which had already sunk, at anchor, the 25 year-old battleship SMS Wien (5,785 tons) the year before. Rizzo's MAS boat launched two torpedoes, hitting one of the four Austrian dreadnoughts, the SMS Szent István, which had already slowed down due to engine problems. The element of surprise lost, Horthy broke off his attack. Huge efforts were made by the crew to save Szent István, which had been hit below the waterline, and the dreadnought battleship Tegetthoff took her in tow until a tug arrived. However just after 6 a.m., the pumps being unequal to the task, the ship, now listing badly, had to be abandoned. Szent István sank soon afterwards, taking 89 crewmen with her. The event was filmed from a sister ship.

In 1918, in order to avoid having to give the fleet to the victors, the Austrian Emperor handed down the entire Austro-Hungarian Navy and merchant fleet, with all harbours, arsenals and shore fortifications to the new State of Slovenes, Croats and Serbs. The state of SCS was proclaimed officially on 29 October 1918 but never recognized by other countries. Diplomatic notes were sent to the governments of France, the United Kingdom, Italy, the United States and Russia, to notify them that the State of SCS was not at war with any of them and that the Council had taken over the entire Austro-Hungarian fleet; no response was provided, and for all practical purposes the war went on unchanged. Austria asked for an armistice on 29 October; after a few days' negotiation and the signatures, the armistice entered into force on 4 November.

On 1 November 1918, two sailors of the Italian Regia Marina, Raffaele Paolucci and Raffaele Rossetti, rode a primitive manned torpedo (nicknamed the Mignatta or "leech") into the Austro-Hungarian naval base at Pola. Using limpet mines, they then sank the anchored Viribus Unitis, with considerable loss of life, as well as the freighter Wien. The French navy commandeered the new dreadnought Prinz Eugen, which it took to France and later used for target practice in the Atlantic, where it was destroyed.

==== Ships lost ====
- Ships lost in World War I:
  - 1914: SMS Kaiserin Elisabeth (Siege of Tsingtao, 1914), SMS Zenta, SMS Flamingo (TB. 26)
  - 1915: SM U-12, SM U-3, SMS Lika, SMS Triglav
  - 1916: SM U-6, SM U-16
  - 1917: SM U-30, SMS Wildfang, SMS Wien, SMS TB.XII, SMS Inn (sunk by a Romanian mine)
  - 1918: SM U-23, SMS Streiter, SM U-20, SM U-10, SMS Szent István, SMS Viribus Unitis
- Ships lost after World War I:
  - 1919: SMS Kaiser Franz Joseph I

== Organisation ==
=== Ports and locations ===
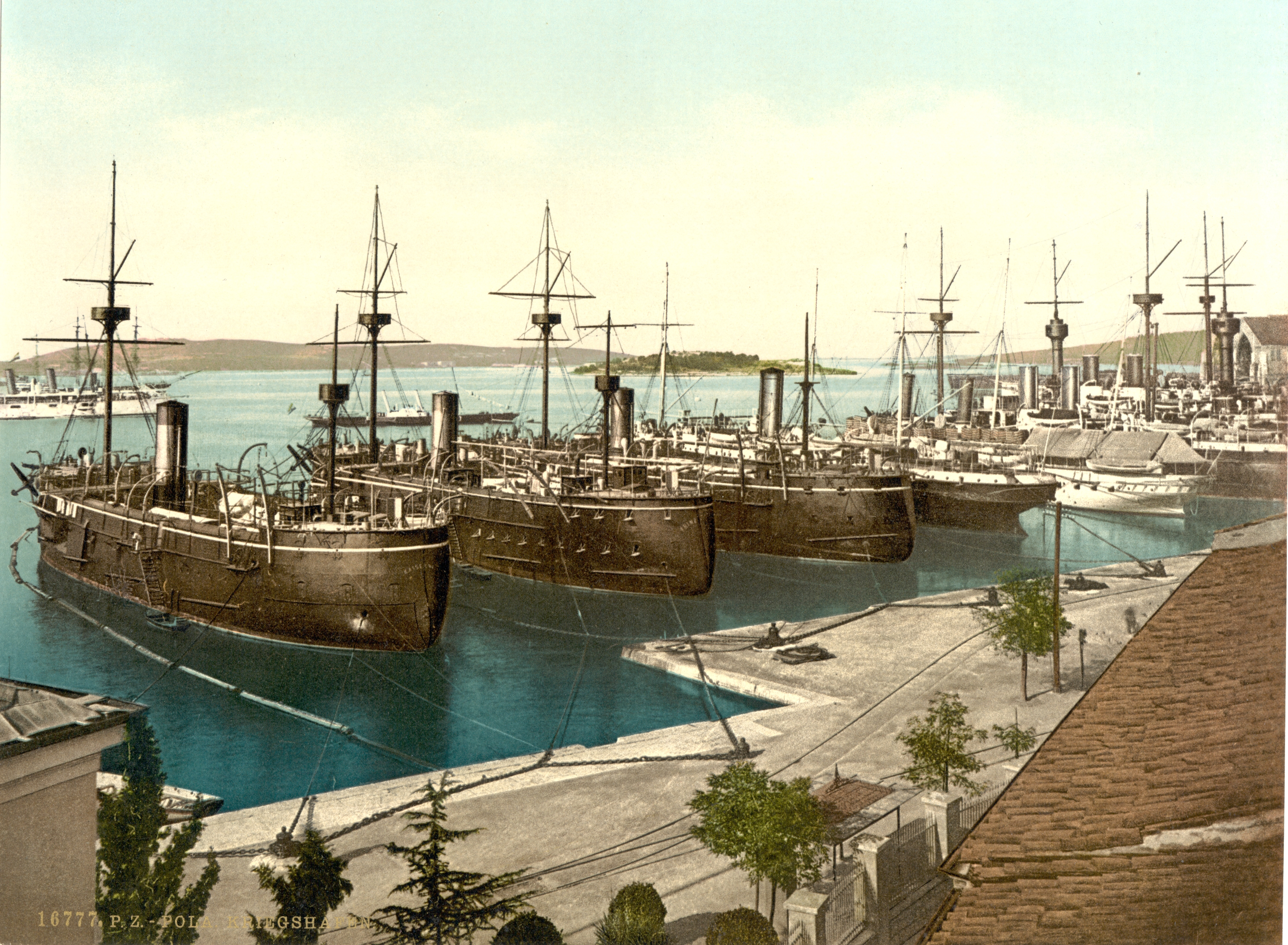
Austro-Hungarian naval yard at Pula; ca. 1890

The home port of the Austro-Hungarian Navy was the Seearsenal (naval base) at Pola (now Pula, Croatia); a role it took over from Venice, where the early Austrian Navy had been based. Supplementary bases included the busy port of Trieste and the natural harbour of Cattaro (now Kotor, Montenegro). Both Trieste and Pola had major shipbuilding facilities. Pola's naval installations contained one of the largest floating drydocks in the Mediterranean. The city of Pola was also the site of the central church of the navy "Stella Maris" (k.u.k. Marinekirche "Stella Maris"), of the Austro-Hungarian Naval Observatory and the empire's naval military cemetery (k.u.k. Marinefriedhof). The cemetery still exists and was restored in 1990. The Austro-Hungarian Naval Academy (k.u.k. Marine-Akademie) was located in Fiume (now Rijeka, Croatia).

Trieste was also the headquarters of the merchant line Österreichischer Lloyd (founded in 1836 and, later, Lloyd Triestino; now Italia Marittima), whose headquarters stood at the corner of the Piazza Grande and Sanita. By 1913, Österreichischer Lloyd had a fleet of 62 ships comprising a total of 236,000 tons.

=== Structure ===
The Austro-Hungarian Navy was under the control of the Imperial and Royal Naval Section (K. u. k. Marinesektion), a separate department under the common War Ministry of the Realm (Reichskriegsministerium). An independent Naval Ministry (Marineministerium) existed in the short period of time between 1862 and 1865 and the Austrian admirals have demanded, that it should be reinstated, but this fell through due to the ongoing negotiations between the Imperial court and Hungary in preparation for the Austro-Hungarian Compromise of 1867. The Hungarian politicians strongly objected the creation of a fourth common ministry, unless two of the eventually four ministries relocate to Budapest. The Austro-Hungarian Navy had the following structure:

==== Naval Section ====
Imperial and Royal Naval Section (K. u. k. Marinesektion), Vordere Zollamtsstraße 9, III. Urban District, Vienna

Chief of the Naval Section and Commander of the Navy (Chef der Marinesektion und Marinekommandanten)

- Deputy Commander of the Navy (Stellvertreter des Marinekommandanten)
- - the naval staff -
  - Office of Administration (Präsidialkanzlei)
  - Office of Operations (Operationskanzlei)
  - I. Work Group (I. Geschäftsgruppe)
    - 1. Department (1. Abteilung) - Personnel affairs for sailors, petty officers and junior officers
    - 2. Department (2. Abteilung) - Manpower generation, career development and social affairs for servicemen and family members
    - 3. Department (3. Abteilung) - Logistics
  - II. Work Group (I. Geschäftsgruppe)
    - 4. Department (4. Abteilung) - Technical R&D department
    - 5. Department (5. Abteilung) - Marine fortifications and coastal installations
    - 6. Department (6. Abteilung) - Expenditures, comptrolling, commercial negotiations and contracting
    - 7. Department (7. Abteilung) - Legal department
    - 8. Department (8. Abteilung) - Financial auditing
    - 9. Department (9. Abteilung) - Medical department
- Naval Inspection (Materialkontrollamt), Vienna, Chairman (Vorstand) - Rear Admiral
- Central Naval Archive (Marinezentralarchiv), Vienna

==== Commands and units ====
Harbour Admiralty (Hafenadmiralat), Pola (all in Pola, except for the Trieste Seamen Detachment), Harbour Admiral and Commander of the War Port (Hafenadmiral und Kriegshafenkommandant) - Vice-Admiral

- Harbour Admiral's Deputy (Adlatus des Hafenadmirals) - Rear Admiral
- Military Department (Militärabteilung)
- Mobilisation Department (Mobilisierungsabteilung)
- Telegraph Bureau (Telegraphenbureau)
- Medical Department (Sanitätsabteilung)
- Department for Economy and Administration (Ökonomisch-administrative Abteilung)
- Legal Advisor and Military Attorney (Justizreferent und Militäranwalt)
- Naval Pay Service (Marinezahlamt)
- Seamen Corps (Matrosenkorps) - army regiment equivalent for the seamen on shore duty
  - I. Seamen Depot (I. Matrosendepot) - army battalion equivalent
  - II. Seamen Depot (I. Matrosendepot) - army battalion equivalent
  - III. Seamen Depot (I. Matrosendepot) - army battalion equivalent
  - Trieste Seamen Detachment (Matrosendetachement zu Triest), in Trieste - army battalion equivalent
- School for Naval Machinery (Maschinenschule)
- Naval Boys' School (Marine-Volks- und -Bürgerschule für Knaben)
- Naval Girls' School (Marine-Volks- und -Bürgerschule für Mädchen)
- Hydrographic Service (Hydrographisches Amt)
  - Starwatch (Sternwarte)
  - Department for Geophysics (Abteilung für Geophysik)
  - Depot for Fine Instruments (Instrumentendepot)
  - Depot for Naval Maps (Seekartendepot)
- Naval Hospital (Marinespital)
- Naval Food Provision Service (Marineproviantamt)
- Naval Cloathing Service (Marinebekleidungsamt)
- Naval Prison (Marinegefangenhaus)

Naval Arsenal Command (Seearsenalskommando), Pola, Commander of the Arsenal (Arsenals-Kommandant) - Vice-Admiral

- Deputy Commander of the Arsenal (Stellvertretender Arsenals-Kommandant) - Rear Admiral
- Administrative Director (Verwaltungsdirektor)
- Equipment Directorate (Ausrüstungsdirektion)
- Port Depot (Hafendepot)
- Torpedo Boats Directorate (Torpedobootsdirektion)
- Rigging Directorate (Takeldirektion)
- Arsenal Commission (Arsenalskommission)
- Shipbuilding Directorate (Schiffbaudirektion)
- Machinery Construction Directorate (Maschinenbaudirektion)
- Artillery Directorate (Artilleriedirektion)
- Chemical Laboratory (Chemisches Laboratorium)
- Naval Ammunitions Establishment (Marinemunitionsetablissement)
- Main Ammunition Storage (Hauptmagazin)
- School for Basic and Specialised Training (Lehrlings- und Arbeiterschule)

Marine Fortifications and Coastal Installations Service (Marine-Land- und -Wasserbauamt), Pola, Director (Direktor) - Major-General

Naval Technical Committee (Marinetechnisches Komitee), Pola, Chairman (Präses) - Vice-Admiral

- Deputy (Stellvertretender) - Rear Admiral

Naval Intelligence Bureau (Marineevidenzbureau), Pola

Naval Technical Control Commission (Marinetechnische Kontrollkommission), Pola

Naval Superiorate (Marinesuperiorat) (chaplaincy)

Naval Academy (Marineakademie), Fiume, Commandant (Kommandant) - Rear Admiral

Sea Transport Coordination Office (Seetransportleitung), Trieste

==== Shore services ====
Sea District Command Trieste (Seebezirkskommando zu Triest), Commandant (Kommandant) - Rear Admiral

- Technical Department (Technische Abteilung)
- Financial Department (Rechnungsabteilung)

Sea District Command Sebenico (Seebezirkskommando zu Sebenico), Commandant (Kommandant) - Rear Admiral

- Military Department (Militär-Abteilung)
- Legal Department (Justizabteilung)
- Medical Department (Sanitätsabteilung)
- Department for Economy and Administration (Ökonomisch-administrative Abteilung)

Defence District Command Castelnuovo (Verteidigungsbezirkskommando zu Castelnuovo)

Warfleet [Personnel] Replacement Commands (Kriegsmarine-Ergänzungsbezirkskommandos) in Triest, Sebenico and Fiume

Secondary Location Commands (Platzkommandos) in Sebenico and Spalato

Naval Detachment in Budapest (Marine-Detachement zu Budapest)

==== Overseas services ====
Naval Detachment in Beijing (Marinedetachement in Peking)

Naval Detachment in Tianjin (Marinedetachement in Tientsin)

==== The Fleet ====
The entire operational fleet was called the Imperial and Royal Squadron (K.u.k. Eskadre). The Eskadre was divided into a Ship-of-the-Line Fleet, a Cruiser Flotilla and a Submarine Flotilla, plus technically outdated warships for harbour defence and various support ships.

Imperial and Royal Squadron

Ship-of-the-Line Fleet

- 1st Squadron - Vice-Admiral Maximilian Njegovan
  - 1st Heavy Division (Note: Szent István was commissioned in December 1915)
    - SMS Viribus Unitis (Note: Viribis Unitis was the fleet flagship)
    - SMS Tegetthoff
    - SMS Prinz Eugen
  - 2nd Heavy Division - Rear Admiral Anton Willenik
    - SMS Erzherzog Franz Ferdinand
    - SMS Radetzky
    - SMS Zrínyi
- 2nd Squadron - Rear Admiral Franz Löfler
  - 3rd Heavy Division
    - SMS Erzherzog Ferdinand Max
    - SMS Erzherzog Friedrich
    - SMS Erzherzog Karl
  - 4th Heavy Division - Rear Admiral Karl Seidensacher
    - SMS Habsburg
    - SMS Árpád
    - SMS Babenberg
- 5th Heavy Division (Note: The 5th Heavy Division fell under the Ship-of-the-Line Fleet only administratively, as its ships were obsolete and could not take part in a naval engagement next to their more modern counterparts. The ships of the division were used for harbour guard duty)
  - SMS Monarch
  - SMS Wien
  - SMS Budapest

Cruiser Flotilla The Cruiser Flotilla included all the lighter and light surface forces of the Navy - armored cruisers, light cruisers, destroyers and torpedo boats under the command of Vice-Admiral Paul Fiedler.

- 1st Cruiser Division - Vice-Admiral Paul Fiedler
  - SMS Sankt Georg
  - SMS Kaiser Karl VI
  - SMS Helgoland
  - SMS Aspern
  - SMS Zenta
  - SMS Szigetvár
- 2nd Cruiser Division (Note: The 2nd Cruiser Division was nominally under the Cruiser Flotilla, but its outdated cruisers were used as harbour guard duty)
  - SMS Kaiser Franz Joseph I
  - SMS Panther
  - SMS Kaiserin Elisabeth (Note: Kaiserin Elisabeth was the station ship of the East Asia station, and was deployed to Qingdao. The ship was scuttled in November 1914)
- 1st Destroyer Division - Fregattenkapitän Heinrich Seitz
  - SMS Saida (Division Leader)
  - SMS Gäa (Depot ship)
  - SMS Tátra
  - SMS Balaton
  - SMS Lika
  - SMS Csepel
  - SMS Triglav
  - SMS Orjen
  - SMS Velebit
  - SMS Dinara
  - SMS Reka
  - SMS Pandar
  - SMS Csikós
  - SMS Huszár
  - 3rd Torpedo Division
    - 1st Torpedo Group
      - SMS 74T
      - SMS 75T
      - SMS 76T
      - SMS 77T
    - 2nd Torpedo Group
      - SMS 50E
      - SMS 51T
      - SMS 73F
    - 3rd Torpedo Group
      - SMS 53T
      - SMS 54T
      - SMS 56T
- 2nd Destroyer Division - Fregattenkapitän Benno von Millenkovich
  - SMS Admiral Spaun (Division Leader)
  - SMS Dampfer (Depot ship)
  - SMS Turul
  - SMS Uskoke
  - SMS Scharfschutze
  - SMS Wildfang
  - SMS Streiter
  - SMS Ulan
  - SMS Meteor
  - SMS Blitz
  - SMS Komet
  - SMS Planet
  - SMS Trabant
  - SMS Satellit
  - SMS Magnet
  - 5th Torpedo Division
    - 4th Torpedo Group
      - SMS 55T
      - SMS 68F
      - SMS 70F
    - 5th Torpedo Group
      - SMS 61T
      - SMS 65F
      - SMS 66F
    - 6th Torpedo Group
      - SMS 64F
      - SMS 69F
      - SMS 72F
  - 6th Torpedo Division
    - 7th Torpedo Group
      - SMS 52T
      - SMS 58T
      - SMS 59T
    - 8th Torpedo Group
      - SMS 60T
      - SMS 62T
      - SMS 63T
    - 9th Torpedo Group
      - SMS 57F
      - SMS 67F
      - SMS 72F

Local Defence Forces

- Pola
  - 11th Torpedo Boat Group
    - SMS Tb1
    - SMS Tb2
    - SMS Tb7
    - SMS Tb9
  - 13th Torpedo Boat Group
    - SMS 21
    - SMS 24
    - SMS 32
    - SMS 39
  - Minesweeping Flotilla
    - SMS Tb18
    - SMS 27
    - SMS 30
    - SMS 33
    - SMS 34
    - SMS 37
    - SMS 40
  - Other vessels
    - SMS Tb14
- Trieste
  - 15th/16th Torpedo Boat Group
    - SMS 20
    - SMS 23
    - SMS 26
- Lussin
  - 17th/18th Torpedo Boat Group
    - SMS Tb3
    - SMS Tb4
    - SMS Tb5
    - SMS Tb6
- Sebenico
  - SMS Kaiserin und Königin Maria Theresia (Note: Kaiserin und Königin Maria Theresia was nominally part of the 1st Cruiser Division)
  - 19th Torpedo Boat Group
    - SMS Tb8
    - SMS Tb10
    - SMS Tb11
    - SMS Tb12
  - 20th Torpedo Boat Group
    - SMS 19
    - SMS 22
    - SMS 25
    - SMS 31
  - Minesweeping Group
    - SMS 29
    - SMS 35
- Cattaro
  - SMS Kronprinz Erzherzog Rudolf
  - 21st Torpedo Boat Group
    - SMS Tb13
    - SMS Tb15
    - SMS Tb16
    - SMS Tb17
  - Minesweeping Group
    - SMS 36
    - SMS 38

Submarine Flotilla Submarine Station, Pola (subordinated to the Harbour Admiralty in peacetime, with the outbreak of WWI the station expanded into the Submarine Flotilla and transferred to the island of Brioni where the Imperial and Royal Base for Submarines was built)

- SM U-1
- SM U-2
- SM U-3
- SM U-4
- SM U-5
- SM U-6

Danube Flotilla
In addition to the seagoing force stationed in the Adriatic, the navy also had units stationed for operations on the River Danube and its tributaries.

- River Danube
  - Monitor Group 1
    - SMS Temes
    - SMS Bodrog
    - Patrouillenboot 'B'
    - Patrouillenboot 'F'
  - Monitor Group 2
    - SMS Körös
    - SMS Szamos
    - Patrouillenboot 'C'
  - Patrol Boat Station Pancsova
    - Patrouillenboot 'D'
    - Patrouillenboot 'G'
- River Sava
  - Monitor Group
    - SMS Leitha
    - SMS Maros
    - Patrouillenboot 'H'

== Naval aviation: the k.u.k. Seefliegerkorps ==
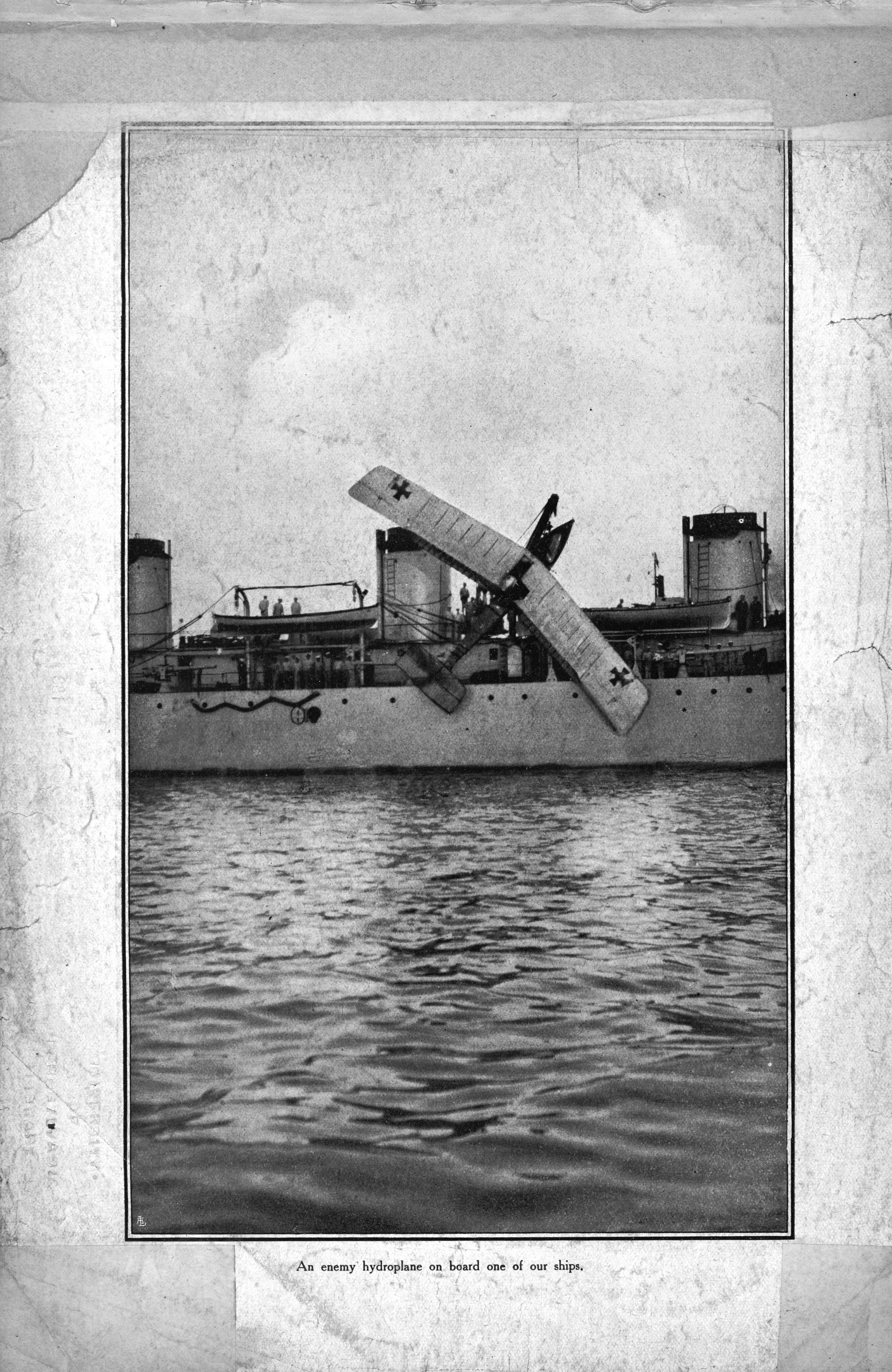
k.u.k hydroaircraft salvaged at Grado, Italy

In August 1916, the Imperial and Royal Naval Air Corps or k.u.k. Seeflugwesen was established. In 1917 it was rechristened the k.u.k. Seefliegerkorps. Its first aviators were naval officers who received their initial pilot training at the airfields of Wiener Neustadt in Lower Austria, where the Theresian Military Academy is also located. They were first assigned for tours aboard the Tegetthoff-class battleships. The first Austro-Hungarian naval aviation facility, or Seeflugstation, was established at Pola (now Pula, Croatia). The facility was built and became operational at the turn of 1911 and 1912. This made the Austro-Hungarian Navy a pioneer in naval aviation, having the first such operational facility in Europe. A subsequent flying school (Schulflugstation) was established in 1913 on Cosada island (now Kotež), near Pola. Later, the k.u.k. Seefliegerkorps also served at the following airfields in Albania and southern Dalmatia: Berat, Kavaja, Tirana, Scutari and Igalo. They also had airfields at Podgorica in Montenegro.

- Flik 1 - Igalo from June - November 1918
- Flik 6 - Igalo from November 1915 - January 1916
  - - Scutari from January 1916 - June 1917
  - - Tirana from July 1917 - June 1918
  - - Banja from June - July 1918
  - - Tirana from July - September 1918
  - - Podgorica from September - November 1918
- Flik 13 - Berat from August - September 1918
  - - Kavaja from September - October 1918

The following Austrian squadrons served at Feltre also:

- Flik 11 - from February 1918
- Flik 14 - from June 1918 to November 1918
- Flik 16 - from November 1917 - October 1918
- Flik 31 - from June - July 1918
- Flik 36 - from June - July 1918
- Flik 39 - from January - May 1918
- Flik 45 - during April 1918
- Flik 56 - during December 1917
- Flik 60J - from March - September 1918
- Flik 66 - from January 1918 - November 1918
- Flik 101 - during May 1918

Feltre was captured by Austrian forces on 12 November 1917 after the Battle of Caporetto. There were two other military airfields nearby, at Arsie and Fonzaso. It was the main station for the Austrian naval aviators in that area. The k.u.k. Seeflugwesen used mostly modified German aircraft, but produced several variations of its own. Notable aircraft for the service were the following:

- Fokker A.III
- Fokker E.III
- Hansa-Brandenburg B.I
- Hansa-Brandenburg D.I
- Aviatik D.I
- Albatros W.4
- Phönix D.I
- Fokker D.VII
- Lohner L

== Problems affecting the navy ==
For most of the period of its existence the Austrian (and later Austro-Hungarian) Navy was never a high financial or political priority for the Empire.

Sea power was never an important consideration in Austrian foreign policy. In addition, the Navy was relatively little known to the public, and did not enjoy widespread support or popular enthusiasm. Activities such as open days and naval clubs were unable to change the sentiment that the Navy was just something "expensive but far away". Another point was that naval expenditures were for most of the time overseen by the Austrian War Ministry, which was largely controlled by the Army, the only exception being the period preceding the Battle of Lissa.

The Navy was only able to secure significant public attention and funds during the three short periods it was actively supported by a member of the Imperial Family. The Archdukes Friedrich (1821–1847), Ferdinand Maximilian (1832–1867), and Franz Ferdinand (1863–1914), each with a keen private interest in the fleet, held senior naval ranks and were energetic campaigners for naval matters. However, none lasted long, as Archduke Friedrich died early, Ferdinand Maximilian left Austria to become Emperor of Mexico and Franz Ferdinand was assassinated before he acceded the throne. A further problem for the Navy was that the Empire's battleship designs were generally of a smaller tonnage than those of other European powers.

The Austro-Hungarian Compromise of 1867 aimed to calm political dissatisfaction by creating the Dual Monarchy, in which the Emperor of Austria was also the King of Hungary. This constitutional change was also reflected in the navy's title, which changed to "Imperial and Royal Navy" (kaiserlich und königliche Kriegsmarine, short form K. u K. Kriegsmarine).

== Notable personnel ==
- Archduke Franz Ferdinand, Admiral. Commander-in-Chief of the Navy
- Archduke Ferdinand Maximilian, Vice Admiral. Commander-in-Chief of the Navy
- Ludwig von Fautz, Vice Admiral. Commander-in-Chief of the Navy and Secretary of the Navy
- Wilhelm von Tegetthoff, Vice Admiral of the mid-19th century, known for his role in the Battle of Lissa (1866). He was probably the most famous Austrian sailor, later also Commander-in-Chief of the Navy.
- Friedrich von Pöck, Vice Admiral, Commander-in-Chief of the Navy, Tegetthoff's successor.
- Maximilian von Sterneck, Admiral. Fought at Lissa, was a benefactor of the city of Pola and Commander-in-Chief of the Navy.
- Karl Weyprecht, Arctic explorer. One of the leaders of the Austro-Hungarian North Pole Expedition from 1872 to 1874.
- Bernhard von Wüllerstorf-Urbair, Vice Admiral. Leader of the Novara Expedition from 1857 to 1859, later Imperial Minister of Trade.
- Gottfried von Banfield, Austria-Hungary's most successful naval aviator in World War I. Later a businessman in Trieste.
- Miklós Horthy, Rear Admiral in World War I, and on the last days nominally the last commander of the Austro-Hungarian fleet, as Vice Admiral. Later Regent of Hungary until 1944.
- Georg Ludwig von Trapp, Austrian submarine officer in World War I. Later a businessman and head of the famous Von Trapp Family Singers featured in the musical The Sound of Music.
- Ludwig von Höhnel, Austrian naval officer and explorer of Africa.
- Julius von Wagner-Jauregg, physician and officer in the Austro-Hungarian Naval Reserve. Later awarded the Nobel Prize in Medicine in 1927.

== Ranks and rates of the Navy ==
=== Commissioned officer ranks ===
The rank insignia of commissioned officers.

Rank group	General / flag officers				Senior officers			Junior officers
Austro-Hungarian Navy
Austro-Hungarian Navy	Großadmiral; Főtengernagy	Admiral; Tengernagy	Vizeadmiral; Altengernagy	Kontreadmiral; Ellentengernagy	Linienschiffkapitän; Sorhajókapitány	Fregattenkapitän; Fregattkapitány	Korvettenkapitän; Korvettkapitány	Linienschiffsleutnant; Sorhajóhadnagy	Fregattenleutnant; Fregatthadnagy	Korvettenleutnant; Korvetthadnagy

=== Other ranks ===
The rank insignia of non-commissioned officers and enlisted personnel.

Rank group	NCOs			Enlisted
Austro-Hungarian Navy
Austro-Hungarian Navy	Oberstabsbootsmann	Stabsbootsmann	Unterbootsmann	Bootsmannsmaat	Quartiermeister	Matrose 1. Klasse	Matrose 2. Klasse

== Senior leadership ==
=== Commanders-in-Chief of the Navy ===
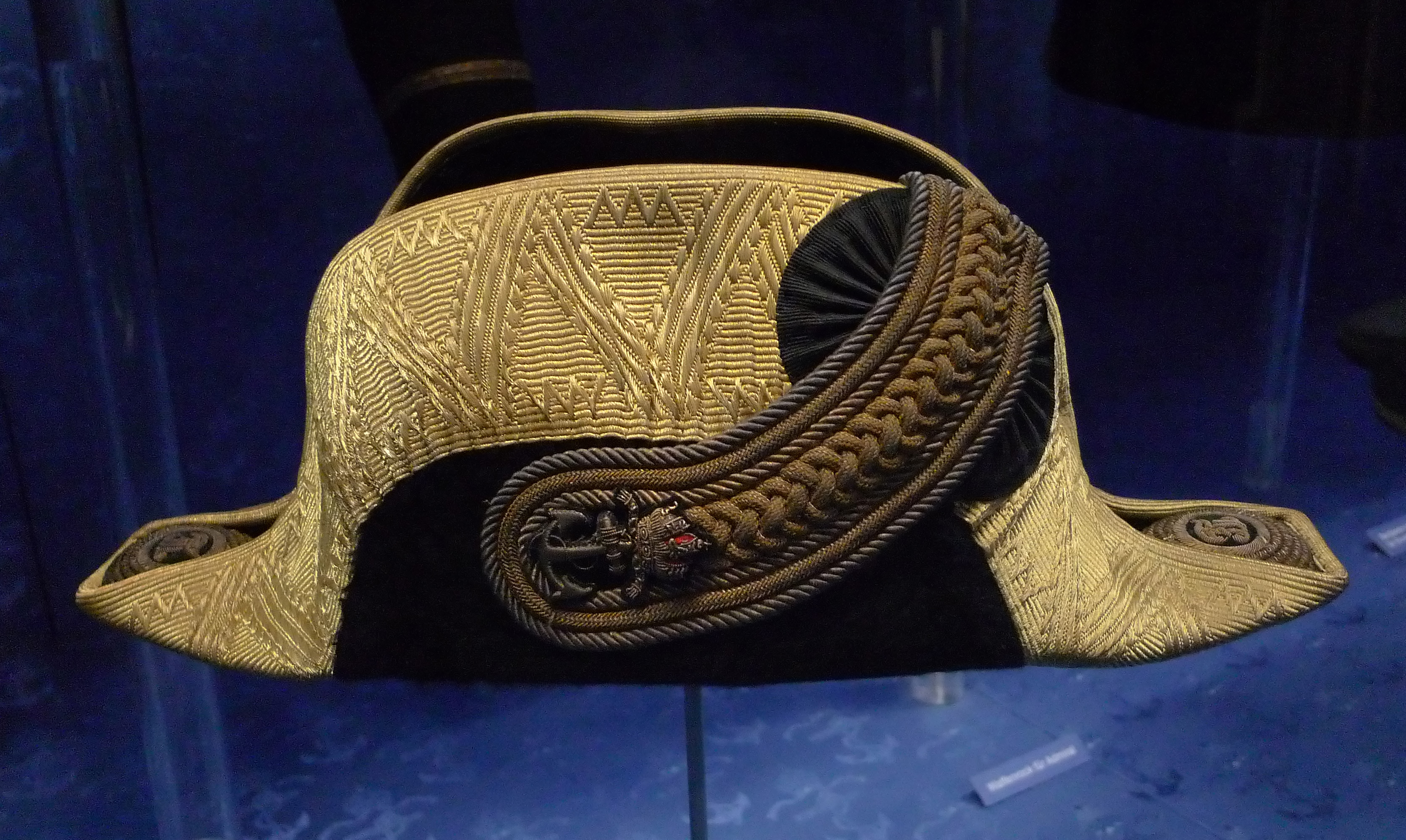
Austro-Hungarian Navy flag officer uniform hat, Museum of Military History, Vienna

Portrait	Name (Birth–Death)	Term of office			Ref.
Portrait	Name (Birth–Death)	Took office	Left office	Time in office	Ref.
Oberkommandant der Marine
	Vice admiral Hans Birch Dahlerup (1790–1872)	February 1849	August 1851	2 years, 6 months	
	Vice admiral Franz Graf von Wimpffen (1797–1870)	August 1851	September 1854	3 years, 1 month	
	Vice admiral Archduke Ferdinand Maximilian (1832–1867)	September 1854	1860	5–6 years	
	Vice admiral Ludwig von Fautz (1811–1880)	1860	March 1865	4–5 years	
Marinekommandant
	Vice admiral Wilhelm von Tegetthoff (1827–1871)	March 1868	April 1871	3 years, 1 month	
	Vice admiral Friedrich von Pöck (1825–1884)	April 1871	November 1883	12 years, 7 months	
	Admiral; Maximilian Daublebsky von Sterneck (1829–1897)	November 1883	5 December 1897 †	14 years, 1 month	
	Admiral; Hermann von Spaun (1833–1919)	December 1897	October 1904	6 years, 10 months	
	Admiral; Graf Rudolf Montecuccoli (1843–1922)	October 1904	February 1913	8 years, 4 months	
	Grand admiral Anton Haus (1851–1917)	February 1913	8 February 1917 †	4 years	
	Admiral; Maximilian Njegovan (1858–1930)	April 1917	February 1918	10 months	

=== Commanders-in-Chief of the Fleet (1914–1918) ===
(in German Flottenkommandant)

- Anton Haus, Adm./GAdm (July 1914–February 1917)
- Maximilian Njegovan, Adm. (February 1917–February 1918)
- Miklós Horthy, KAdm./VAdm. (February 1918–November 1918)

=== Heads of the Naval Section at the War Ministry ===
(in German Chef der Marinesektion at the Kriegsministerium)

- Ludwig von Fautz, VAdm. (March 1865–April 1868)
- Wilhelm von Tegetthoff, VAdm.(March 1868–April 1871)
- Friedrich von Pöck, Adm. (October 1872–November 1883)
- Maximilian Daublebsky von Sterneck, Adm. (November 1883–December 1897)
- Hermann von Spaun, Adm. (December 1897–October 1904)
- Rudolf Montecuccoli, Adm. (October 1904–February 1913)
- Anton Haus, Adm./GAdm. (February 1913–February 1917)
- Karl Kailer von Kaltenfels, VAdm. (February 1917–April 1917)
- Maximilian Njegovan, Adm. (April 1917–February 1918)
- Franz von Holub, VAdm. (February 1918–November 1918)

=== Constructors General ===
(in German Generalschiffbauingenieur)

- Josef von Romako
- A. Waldvogel
- Siegfried Popper, (1904–April 1907)
- Franz Pitzinger, (November 1914–1918)

== Naval ensign ==
Austro-Hungarian naval ensign, 1786–1915

Austro-Hungarian naval ensign, 1915–1918

Until Emperor Joseph II authorized a naval ensign on 20 March 1786, Austrian naval vessels used the yellow and black imperial flag. The flag, formally adopted as Marineflagge (naval ensign) was based on the colours of the Archduchy of Austria. It served as the official flag also after the Ausgleich in 1867, when the Austrian navy became the Austro-Hungarian Navy. During World War I, Emperor Franz Joseph approved of a new design, which also contained the Hungarian arms. This flag, officially instituted in 1915, was however little used, and ships continued displaying the old Ensign until the end of the war. Photographs of Austro-Hungarian ships flying the post-1915 form of the Naval Ensign are therefore relatively rare.

== In popular culture ==
British author John Biggins wrote a series of four historical novels concerning the Austro-Hungarian Navy and a fictional hero named Ottokar Prohaska, although genuinely historical individuals, such as Georg Ludwig von Trapp and Archduke Franz Ferdinand of Austria make appearances. Published by McBooks Press, the novels are:

- A Sailor of Austria: In Which, Without Really Intending to, Otto Prohaska Becomes Official War Hero No. 27 of the Habsburg Empire
- The Emperor's Coloured Coat: In Which Otto Prohaska, Hero of the Habsburg Empire, Has an Interesting Time While Not Quite Managing to Avert the First World War
- The Two-Headed Eagle: In Which Otto Prohaska Takes a Break as the Habsburg Empire's Leading U-boat Ace and Does Something Even More Thanklessly Dangerous
- Tomorrow the World: In which Cadet Otto Prohaska Carries the Habsburg Empire's Civilizing Mission to the Entirely Unreceptive Peoples of Africa and Oceania

== See also ==
- The Adriatic Campaign of World War I
- List of ships of the Austro-Hungarian Navy
- List of Austro-Hungarian U-boats
- Mediterranean naval engagements during World War I

== General and cited references ==
- Anderson, M. S. (1995). The War of the Austrian Succession 1740–1748 (1st ed.). London: Longman. ISBN 058205950X.
- Baratelli, Franco (1983). La marina militare italiana nella vita nazionale (1860–1914) (in Italian). Milan: Ugo Mursia Editore. OCLC 799197000.
- Bolts, Guillaume (1787). Recueil de pièces authentiques, relatives aux affaires de la ci-devant Société impériale asiatique de Trieste, gérées à Anvers (in French). Antwerp.
- Butel, Paul (1997). Européens et espaces maritimes : (vers 1690 - vers 1790) (in French) (2. réimpr. ed.). Talence: Presses Universitaires de Bordeaux. ISBN 2867811945.
- Clark, Martin (2013). The Italian Risorgimento (2nd ed.). Hoboken, NJ: Taylor and Francis. ISBN 9781317862642.
- Donko, Wilhelm M. (2012). A Brief History of the Austrian Navy (in German). Berlin: E-publi Verlag. ISBN 978-3-8442-2129-9.
- De Biasio, Stefano; Freivogel, Zvonimir; Johnson, Harold; Sieche, Erwin; Wetherhorn, Aryeh (1998). "Question 6/97: Disposition of ex-Austro-Hungarian Warships". Warship International. XXXV (1): 94–104. ISSN 0043-0374.
- Frey, Marsha (1995). Frey, Linda (ed.). The Treaties of the War of the Spanish Succession: An Historical and Critical Dictionary (1st ed.). Westport, CT: Greenwood. ISBN 0313278849.
- Gabriele, Mariano; Fritz, Giuliano (1982). La Politica Navale Italiana Dal 1885 Al 1915 (in Italian). Rome: Ufficio Storico della Marina Militare.
- Gardiner, Robert, ed. (1979). Conway's All the World's Fighting Ships 1860–1905. London: Conway Maritime Press. ISBN 0-85177-133-5.
- Giglio, Vittorio (1948). Il Risorgimento nelle sue fasi di guerra (in Italian). Milan: Vallardi.
- Handel-Mazzetti, Peter; Sokol, Hans Hugo (1952). Wilhelm von Tegetthoff, ein grosser Österreicher (in German). Linz: Oberösterreichischer Landesverlag. OCLC 6688034.
- Hauke, Erwin; Schroeder, Walter; Tötschinger, Bernhard (1988). Die Flugzeuge der k.u.k. Luftfahrtruppe und Seeflieger, 1914–1918 (in German) (1. Aufl. ed.). Graz: H. Weishaupt. ISBN 978-3900310462.
- Kemp, Peter (1971). "The Otranto Barrage". History of the First World War. 6 (1). Bristol: BPC Publishing: 2265–2272.
- Lambert, Andrew (1984). Battleships in Transition: The Creation of the Steam Battlefleet, 1815–1860. Annapolis, MD: Naval Institute Press. ISBN 978-0870210907.
- Lavery, Brian (1983). The Ship of the Line (1st ed.). London: Conway Maritime Press. ISBN 0851772528.
- McKay, Derek (1977). Prince Eugene of Savoy. London: Thames and Hudson. ISBN 0500870071.
- Ordovini, Aldo F.; Petronio, Fulvio; Sullivan, David M. (December 2014). "Capital Ships of the Royal Italian Navy, 1860–1918: Part I: The Formidabile, Principe di Carignano, Re d'Italia, Regina Maria Pia, Affondatore, Roma and Principe Amedeo Classes". Warship International. Vol. 51, no. 4. pp. 323–360.
- Pieri, Piero (1962). Storia militare del Risorgimento (in Italian). Torino: Einaudi.
- Reich, Emil (1905). "Abidcation of Francis the Second". Select Documents Illustrating Mediæval and Modern History. Londong: P.S. King & Son. p. 622. OCLC 4426595 – via Internet Archive.
- Salcher, Peter (1902). Geschichte der K. U. K. Marine-akademie (in German). Fiume: Sine nomine.
- Schupita, Peter (1983). Die k.u.k. Seeflieger: Chronik und Dokumentation der österreichisch-ungarischen Marineluftwaffe, 1911–1918 (in German). Koblenz: Bernard und Grafe.
- Sokol, Anthony (1968). The Imperial and Royal Austro-Hungarian Navy. Annapolis: United States Naval Institute. OCLC 462208412.
- Sondhaus, Lawrence (1989). The Habsburg Empire and the Sea: Austrian Naval Policy, 1797–1866. West Lafayette, IN: Purdue University Press. ISBN 978-0911198973.
- Sondhaus, Lawrence (2002). Navies of Europe: 1815-2002. Harlow: Routledge. ISBN 0582506131.
- Tamborra, Angelo (October–December 1957). "Balcani, Italia ed Europa nel problema della Venezia (1859–1861)". Rassegna Storica del Risorgimento (in Italian). 44: 813–818.
- Thaller, Anja (2009). "Graz 1382 – Ein Wendepunkt der Triestiner Geschichte?". Historisches Jahrbuch der Stadt Graz (in German). 38/39: 191–221.
- Trevelyan, George (1909). Garibaldi and the Thousand. New York: Logmans, Green and Co.
- Wagner, Walter (1961). Die obersten Behörden der k.u.k. Kriegsmarine 1856-1918 (in German). Vienna: Druck und Verlag Ferdinand Berger Horn.
- Wedgwood, C. V. (2005). The Thirty Years War. New York: New York Review Books. ISBN 1590171462.
