= French frigate Thémis =

At least three ships vessels of the French Navy have borne the name Thémis, in honour of the Titaness Themis:

- Thémis (1801), a frigate
- Oder (1813), a frigate, was renamed Thémis
- Thémis (1862), a frigate
