= French frigate Thémis (1862) =

Warship

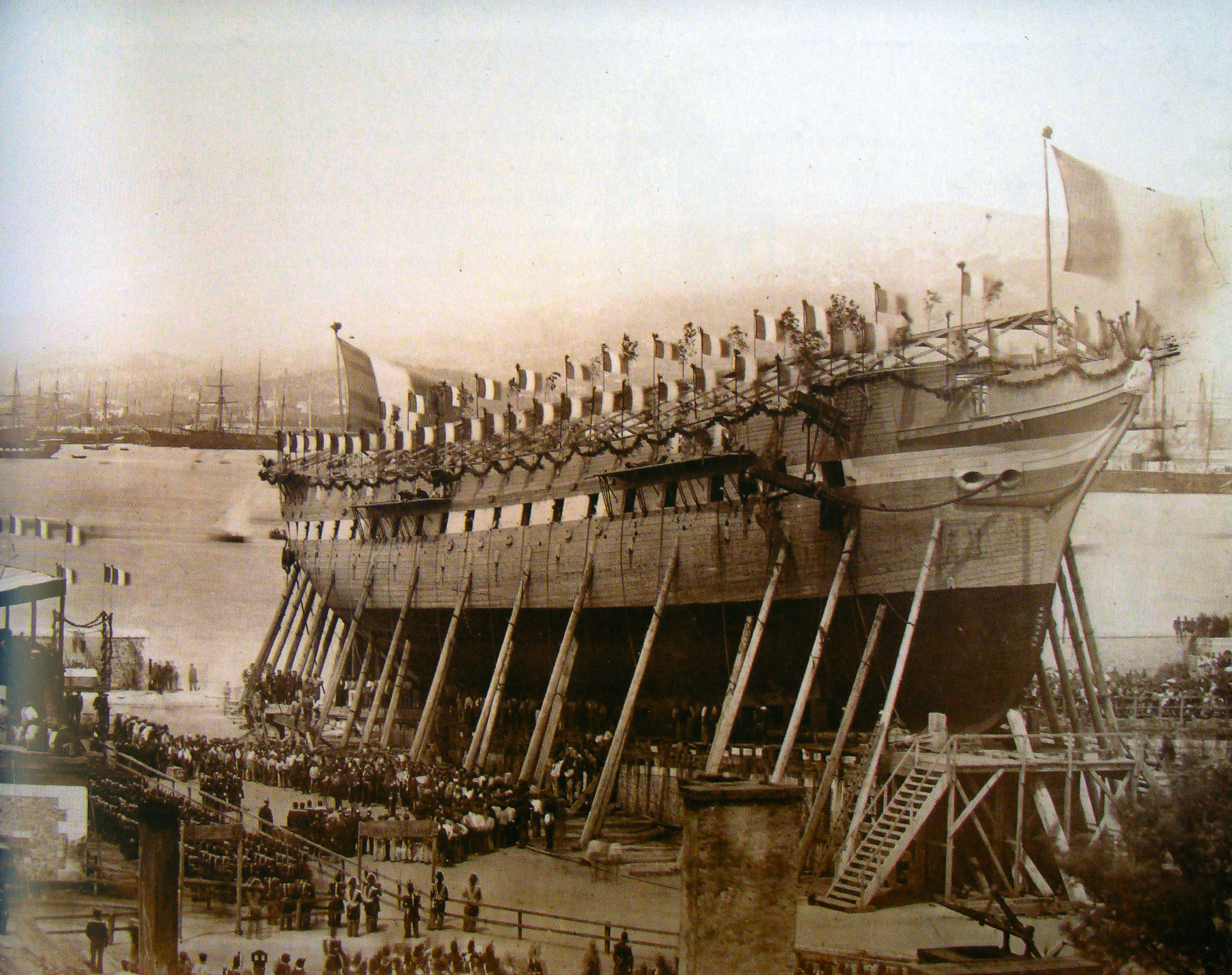
- Launch of Thémis on 29 April 1862

History

France
- Name: Thémis
- Namesake: Themis
- Launched: Toulon, 29 April 1862
- Stricken: 7 November 1882
- Fate: Broken up 1931

General characteristics
- Class & type: Magicienne class frigate
- Propulsion: Sails, steam
- Sail plan: Ship
- Armament: 46 guns

The Thémis was a 46-gun Magicienne class frigate of the French Navy.

The keel of Thémis was laid in 1847, but she took 15 years to complete: as her design would have been obsolete before completion, she was lengthened and fitted with a steam engine, and launched as a steam frigate. She took part in the French intervention in Mexico, and was one of the ships escorting the SMS Novara, carrying Emperor Maximilian to Mexico. From 29 July 1865 to the first of January 1866, she cruised the off Terre-Neuve under captain Amédée Ribourt.

In 1874, she was redesigned as a first class cruiser, and in 1878, she became the flagship of the Southern Atlantic division. She later cruised the South China Sea, until she was decommissioned in 1882, and struck in November of that year.

Until 1929, she was used as a mooring hulk in Toulon harbour. In 1930, she was sold for scrap, and eventually burnt off Lorient on 1 July 1931.

== Sources and references ==
- Roche, Jean-Michel (2005). Dictionnaire des bâtiments de la flotte de guerre française de Colbert à nos jours 1 1671 - 1870. ISBN 978-2-9525917-0-6. OCLC 165892922.
