= Austro-Hungarian U-boat classes =

The Austro-Hungarian U-boat fleet was created in the decade prior to the First World War. They were built to a variety of designs, many under licence from Germany. They served throughout the war against Italian, French and British shipping in the Mediterranean Sea with some success, losing eight of the twenty eight boats in service in return. They were reinforced by the Imperial German Navy’s Pola Flotilla, mainly comprising coastal U-boats transported by rail from Germany's northern shipyards to the Austrian ports on the Adriatic Sea. Following the end of the war in 1918, all Austrian submarines were surrendered to the Entente powers, who disposed of them individually. As both Austria and Hungary became landlocked in the aftermath of the war, no Austrian or Hungarian submarines (or any other naval vessels) have been commissioned since.

In some sources Austro-Hungarian U-boats are referenced with Roman numerals as a way to distinguish them from German U-boats with similar numbers, but the Austro-Hungarian Navy itself used Arabic numerals. There are gaps in the numbering for several reasons. One series of Austro-Hungarian U-boats under construction in Germany was sold and commissioned into the Imperial German Navy. In other cases, U-boats commissioned into the Imperial German Navy were temporarily assigned Austro-Hungarian numbers when they operated in the Mediterranean. One final reason, in the case of the unassigned U-13, was superstition.

This is a list of all U-boats commissioned into the Austro-Hungarian Navy. (Submarines on which construction was begun but which were not completed or commissioned during World War I are not included.)

== U-1 class ==
The U-1 class consisted of two submarines or U-boats named U-1 and U-2, which were built for and operated by the Austro-Hungarian Navy. The U-1-class boats were built to an American design at the navy yard in Pola. The class was a part of the Austro-Hungarian Navy's efforts to competitively evaluate three foreign submarine designs.

The two U-1-class boats, both launched in 1909, were 100 feet (30 m) long and as built were each powered by two gasoline engines while surfaced, and two electric motors when submerged. Neither boat was operational at the beginning of World War I because both were in drydock awaiting replacement diesel engines for their problematic gasoline engines. Beginning in 1915, both boats conducted reconnaissance cruises out of either Trieste or Pola until declared obsolete in early 1918. Both remained in service as a training boats at the submarine base on Brioni, but each was at Pola at the end of the war. They were ceded to Italy as war reparations in 1920 and scrapped at Pola. Neither submarine sank any ships during the war.

== U-3 class ==
The U-3 class consisted of two U-boats, U-3 and U-4, and was also a part of the Austro-Hungarian Navy's efforts to competitively evaluate three foreign submarine designs. The U-3-class boats were designed and built by Germaniawerft of Kiel, Germany. During the evaluations conducted by the Navy, the U-3 design bested the U-1 (Lake) and U-5 (Holland) classes in reliability and provided the best living conditions. They did, however, have the worst diving abilities of the three designs, and produced excessive exhaust smoke. (Note: The results of the evaluation led the Austro-Hungarian Navy to order five new U-boats from Germaniawerft as the U-7 class.)

The two U-3-class boats, both launched in 1908, were just under 140 feet (43 m) long and were each powered by two kerosene two-stroke engines while surfaced, and two electric motors when submerged. The U-3 class initially had diving problems that were alleviated after several modifications to fins and diving planes. Both boats of the class served in combat during World War I. U-3, the lead boat of the class, was sunk by gunfire in August 1915. U-4 was the longest-serving Austro-Hungarian submarine and sank 14,928 gross register tons (GRT) and 7,345 tons of ships, including the Italian armored cruiser Giuseppe Garibaldi in July 1915. U-4 was handed over to France as a war reparation in 1920 and scrapped.

== U-5 class ==
The U-5 class consisted of three U-boats, U-5, U-6, and U-12, and was also a part of the efforts of Austro-Hungarian navy to competitively evaluate three foreign submarine designs. The design of the boats was based upon John Philip Holland's submarine design and the boats featured a single, teardrop-shaped hull, which resembled the design of modern nuclear submarines. The class members were just over 105 feet (32 m) long and displaced 240 tonnes (260 short tons) surfaced and 273 tonnes (301 short tons) submerged. All were originally equipped with two bow torpedo tubes and could carry four torpedoes. The first two boats, U-5 and U-6, built specifically for the Austro-Hungarian Navy, were partially constructed in the United States and completed at Whitehead & Co. at Fiume. The third was completely constructed by Whitehead's at Fiume and purchased by Austria-Hungary to bolster their U-boat fleet after the outbreak of World War I.

All three boats had successes during World War I, between them, sinking five ships with a combined tonnage of 22,391. In addition they captured seven ships as prizes and damaged a French dreadnought of 22,189 tons. All three boats were sunk during the war, though U-5, the lead boat of the class, was raised and recommissioned after her sinking. After the war's end, U-5, the only surviving example of the class, was ceded to Italy as a war reparation and was broken up in 1920.

== U-10 class ==
The U-10 class was a class of five U-boats —U-10, U-11, U-15, U-16, and U-17— of the Austro-Hungarian Navy during World War I. The class was similar to the German Type UB I submarine of the German Imperial Navy (German: Kaiserliche Marine). The boats were small coastal submarines that displaced 125.5 long tons (127.5 t) surfaced and 140.25 long tons (142.50 t) submerged. The first two boats delivered to Austria-Hungary had previously been commissioned in February 1915 by the Kaiserliche Marine, while the remaining three were commissioned by the Austro-Hungarian marine in April 1915.

The U-10 class as a whole did not have much wartime success, two of the boats sinking no ships. Only one boat, U-15 sank more than 1,000 combined tonnage of enemy ships. Of the five submarines of the class, only U-16 was sunk during the war; the remaining four were delivered as war reparations and broken up by 1920.

== U-14 class ==
SM U-14 or U-XIV was a U-boat of the Austro-Hungarian Navy during World War I. She was launched in 1912 as the French Brumaire-class submarine Curie (Q 87), but captured and rebuilt for service in the Austro-Hungarian Navy. At war's end, the submarine was returned to France and restored to her former name.

Curie was launched in July 1912 at Toulon and completed in 1914. She measured just under 171 feet (52 m) long and displaced nearly 400 metric tons (390 long tons) on the surface and just over 550 metric tons (540 long tons) when submerged. At the outbreak of World War I in August 1914, Curie was assigned to duty in the Mediterranean. In mid-December, Curie's commander conceived a plan to infiltrate the Austro-Hungarian Navy's main base at Pola, but during the 20 December attempt, the vessel became ensnared in harbor defenses. Two Austro-Hungarian ships sank Curie, killing three of her crew; the remainder were taken prisoner.

The Austro-Hungarian Navy, which had a small and largely obsolete U-boat fleet, immediately began salvage efforts and succeeded in raising the lightly damaged submarine in early February 1915. After a refit, the boat was commissioned as SM U-14 in June, but had little success early in her career. When her commander fell ill in October, he was replaced by Georg Ludwig von Trapp. U-14 was damaged by a depth charge attack in February 1916, and underwent an extensive modernization through November. Resuming duty under von Trapp, U-14 sank her first ship in April 1917, but had her most successful patrol in August, when she sank five ships—including Milazzo, reportedly the largest cargo ship in the world—in a six-day span.

In January 1918, von Trapp was replaced as commander, but neither of his two successors were able to match his accomplishments. In all, U-14 sank 11 ships with a combined gross register tonnage of nearly 48,000 tons. Returned to France at the end of the war, she rejoined the French Navy in July 1919 under her former name of Curie. She was stricken in 1928 and scrapped in 1929.

== U-20 class ==
The U-20 class was a class of four U-boats, U-20, U-21, U-22, and U-23. The class is sometimes referred to as the Havmanden class because it was based upon the design of the Royal Danish Navy's 1911 Havmanden class submarines, three of which were built in Fiume.

Even though the Havmanden-class design was largely obsolete by the beginning of the war, four boats were ordered by the Austro-Hungarian Navy in 1915, in part because construction could begin immediately. Political considerations caused the order to be split between Austrian and Hungarian firms, which contributed to construction problems and delays, keeping any of the boats from being operational until mid-1917.

The class boats were just over 127 feet (39 m) long and were armed with two front torpedo tubes, a deck gun, and a machine gun. The engines for the boats were unreliable, which compounded handling problems with the design. The U-20 class did not claim any wartime successes, yet lost two of the boats—U-20 and U-23—to enemy action during the war. The remaining two were delivered as war reparations and broken up. The conning tower from U-20, which was raised and salvaged in 1962, is on display in a military museum in Vienna.

== U-27 class ==
The U-27 class was a class of eight U-boats —U-27, U-28, U-29, U-30, U-31, U-32, U-40, and U-41—based upon the German Type UB II design of the German Imperial Navy and was constructed under license in Austria-Hungary.

After the Austro-Hungarian Navy had filled its most urgent needs for submarines after the outbreak of World War I, they selected the German Type UB II design for its next group of submarines in mid-1915. Orders for the first six boats were placed in October 1915 with the Austrian firm of Cantiere Navale Triestino and the Hungarian firm of Ganz Danubius. Two more boats were ordered in 1916, bringing the class total to eight.

The boats were just over 121 feet (37 m) long and were armed with two bow torpedo tubes, a deck gun, and a machine gun. For propulsion they were equipped with twin diesel engines for surface running and twin electric motors for subsurface movement. Although the class was based on the German design, the Austro-Hungarian U-boats were heavier and slightly faster underwater, but less heavily armed than their German counterparts

All eight boats were commissioned into the Austro-Hungarian Navy between 1917 and 1918 and saw active service during the war. SM U-27 and SM U-28 were the most successful in terms of ships sunk and gross register tonnage sunk, respectively. Two boats sank only one ship each, and a third, SM U-30, sank no ships. U-30 was also the only boat of the class to be lost during the war. The remaining seven were ceded to France and Italy as war reparations and six were scrapped by 1920; the seventh sank while being towed to Bizerta for scrapping.

== U-43 class ==
The U-43 class was a class of two coastal U-boats which were Type UB II submarines —U-43, and U-47—of the Imperial German Navy, making the two classes identical. From the beginning of World War I, Austria-Hungary had been working to increase the size of its U-boat fleet, so the Imperial German Navy, which was finding it difficult to obtain trained submarine crews, sold two of its UB II boats, UB-43 and UB-47, to its ally in June 1917.

The German Type UB II design incorporated improvements over Type UB I boats, the first coastal submarines of the German Imperial Navy. Among these were twin engines and shafts for more redundancy during operations, a higher top speed, and larger torpedo tubes with double the complement of torpedoes. As a result the UB II boats were nearly twice as heavy as their predecessor UB I boats.

Both boats of the class were selected for German service in the Mediterranean while under construction. They were shipped via rail to Pola, assembled, launched, and commissioned in the German Imperial Navy, where both enjoyed great success against Allied shipping. In June 1917, the boats were decommissioned, handed over to Austria-Hungary, and then commissioned into the Austro-Hungarian Navy in July. The B in the designation of both boats was dropped, but the submarines retained the same numbers, becoming U-43 and U-47 under the Austro-Hungarian flag. At the end of the war U-43 and U-47 were ceded to Italy and France, respectively, and had been scrapped by 1920.

== Other classes ==
Several other classes were designed, but none of these ended up being operated by the Austro-Hungarian navy.

The U-7-class was a class of five U-boats built by Germaniawerft of Kiel to their 506d design for the Austro-Hungarian Navy. The five boats were sold to the Imperial Germany Navy at the beginning of World War I when it was thought impossible for the submarines to reach the Mediterranean for delivery to Austria-Hungary. The U-boats were operated by the German Imperial Navy (German: Kaiserliche Marine) during World War I. and were alternately referred to as the U-66-class or the Type UD. The Austro-Hungarian Navy, after competitively evaluating six submarines of three foreign designs, had selected the Germaniwerft 506d design over a design from Whitehead & Co. for the U-7 class. The boats, numbered U-7 to U-11, were designed to be 228 feet (69 m) long and displace between 695 and 885 tonnes (766 and 976 short tons) when surfaced and submerged. They were to be armed with five torpedo tubes and a deck gun. For propulsion the design called for twin diesel engines for surface running and twin electric motors for subsurface movement. The Austro-Hungarian Navy ordered the boats in February 1913 and construction began on the first boats in November. After the outbreak of World War I in August 1914, the Austro-Hungarian Navy became convinced that delivery of the still-unfinished submarines to the Mediterranean via Gibraltar would be impossible. As a result, they sold the five boats to the Imperial German Navy in November 1914. The German Navy assigned the numbers U-66 to U-70 to the five submarines and had them redesigned and reconstructed to their specifications. These changes, which included a larger deck gun, increased the displacement of the U-boats by almost 100 tonnes (110 short tons) surfaced and nearly 50 tonnes (55 short tons) submerged.

The U-48 class was a class of four U-boats planned for the Austro-Hungarian Navy (German: Kaiserliche und Königliche Kriegsmarine or German: K.u.K. Kriegsmarine) during World War I. The design of the boats was based on plans purchased from the German firm of AG Weser in January 1916. The Navy authorized Cantiere Navale Triestino to begin construction of the submarines in Pola in September 1916. Only two of the planned four boats were laid down, but both of them were never launched or completed. Both incomplete submarines were scrapped after the war ended.

The U-50 class was a class of four ocean-going U-boats planned for the Austro-Hungarian Navy (German: Kaiserliche und Königliche Kriegsmarine or German: K.u.K. Kriegsmarine) during World War I. The design of the boats was based on the Project 835 design purchased from the German firm of Germaniawerft in July 1915. The Navy authorized Ganz-Danubius to begin construction of the submarines in Fiume in February 1916. Only two of the planned four boats were laid down, but neither were ever launched or completed. The two incomplete submarines were scrapped after the war ended.

The U-52 class was a class of four ocean-going U-boats planned for the Austro-Hungarian Navy (German: Kaiserliche und Königliche Kriegsmarine or German: K.u.K. Kriegsmarine) during World War I. The submarine design was based on the A 6 proposal submitted by Stabilimento Tecnico Triestino (STT) as part of a Navy design competition. STT, under its wartime name of Austriawerft, began construction on the first two boats in 1916, but neither boat was launched or completed before the end of the war. Both incomplete submarines were scrapped after the war ended. Neither of the third and fourth submarines was ever laid down.

The U-101 class was a class of nine U-boats planned for the Austro-Hungarian Navy (German: Kaiserliche und Königliche Kriegsmarine or German: K.u.K. Kriegsmarine) during World War I. The class was based on the Type 1916 S 1 design from Ungarische Unterseebotsbau AG. The first three boats were laid down in late 1917 and early 1918 by Austriawerft in Trieste, but none were launched or completed before the end of the war. None of the other six submarines was ever laid down.

The U-107 class was a class of U-boats planned for the Austro-Hungarian Navy (German: Kaiserliche und Königliche Kriegsmarine or German: K.u.K. Kriegsmarine) during World War I. The design was similar to the Germaniawerft UD design which had formed the basis for the Austro-Hungarian Navy's U-7-class submarines. Two boats (U-107 and U-108) were laid down in early 1918 by Ganz-Danubius in Fiume, but neither was launched or completed before the end of the war. No other submarines of the class were ever laid down.

== Bibliography ==
- Baumgartner, Lothar; Erwin Sieche (1999). Die Schiffe der k.(u.)k. Kriegsmarine im Bild [Austro-Hungarian warships in photographs] (in German). Wien: Verlagsbuchhandlung Stöhr. ISBN 978-3-901208-25-6. OCLC 43596931.
- Gardiner, Robert, ed. (1985). Conway's All the World's Fighting Ships 1906–1921. Annapolis, Maryland: Naval Institute Press. ISBN 978-0-87021-907-8. OCLC 12119866.
- Gibson, R. H.; Maurice Prendergast (2003) [1931]. The German Submarine War, 1914–1918. Annapolis, Maryland: Naval Institute Press. ISBN 978-1-59114-314-7. OCLC 52924732.
- Sieche, Erwin F. (1980). "Austro-Hungarian Submarines". Warship, Volume 2. Naval Institute Press. ISBN 978-0-87021-976-4. OCLC 233144055.
- Jane's Fighting Ships of World War One, Originally published 1919, Republished by Random House Ltd, Great Britain: 1990. ISBN 1-85170-378-0.
- naval-history.net information page on Austrian submarines
