= SM U-40 (Austria-Hungary) =

Austro-Hungarian U-27 class submarine

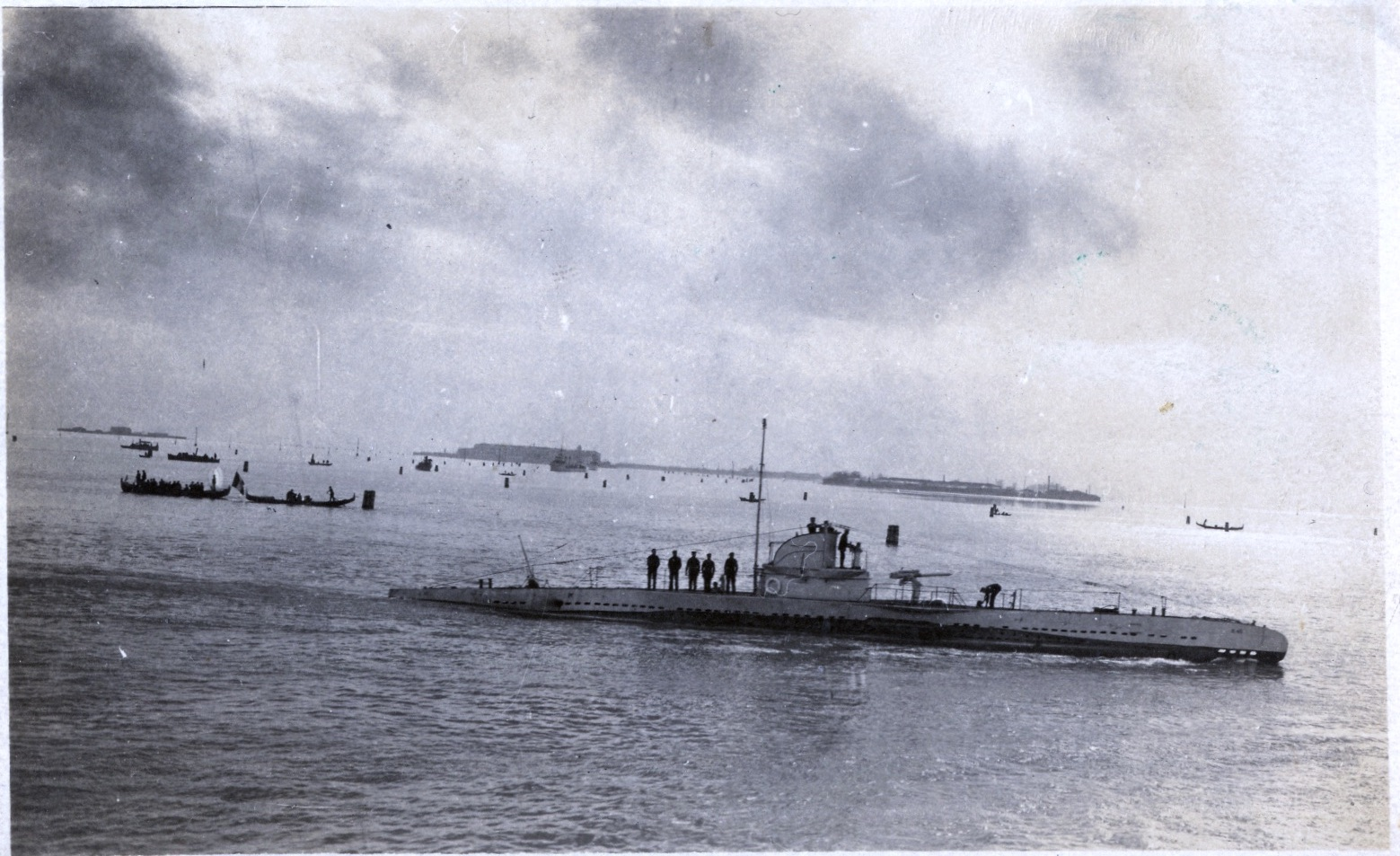
- U-40 arriving in Venice to be surrendered in 1919

History

Austria-Hungary
- Name: SM U-40
- Builder: Cantiere Navale Triestino, Pola
- Laid down: 8 August 1916
- Launched: 21 April 1917
- Commissioned: 4 August 1917
- Fate: Scrapped 1920

Service record
- Commanders: Johann Krsnjavi; 4 August 1917 – 18 September 1918; Wladimir Pfeifer; 19 September – 31 October 1918
- Victories: 3 merchant ships sunk (9,838 GRT); 3 merchant ships damaged (14,112 GRT)

General characteristics
- Type: U-27-class submarine
- Displacement: 264 t (260 long tons) surfaced; 301 t (296 long tons) submerged
- Length: 121 ft 1 in (36.91 m)
- Beam: 14 ft 4 in (4.37 m)
- Draft: 12 ft 2 in (3.71 m)
- Propulsion: 2 × propeller shafts; 2 × diesel engines, 270 bhp (200 kW) total; 2 × electric motors, 280 shp (210 kW) total
- Speed: 9 knots (17 km/h) surfaced; 7.5 knots (14 km/h) submerged
- Complement: 23–24
- Armament: 2 × 45 cm (17.7 in) bow torpedo tubes; 4 torpedoes; 1 × 75 mm/26 (3.0 in) deck gun; 1 × 8 mm (.323 cal) machine gun

SM U-40 or U-XL was a U-27 class U-boat or submarine for the Austro-Hungarian Navy. U-40, built by the Austrian firm of Cantiere Navale Triestino (CNT) at the Pola Navy Yard, was launched in April 1917 and commissioned in August.

She had a single hull and was just over 121 feet (37 m) in length. She displaced nearly 265 metric tons (261 long tons) when surfaced and over 300 metric tons (295 long tons) when submerged. Her two diesel engines moved her at up to 9 knots (17 km/h; 10 mph) on the surface, while her twin electric motors propelled her at up to 7.5 knots (13.9 km/h; 8.6 mph) while underwater. She was armed with two bow torpedo tubes and could carry a load of up to four torpedoes. She was also equipped with a 75 mm (3.0 in) deck gun and a machine gun.

During her service career, U-40 sank three ships and damaged three others, sending a combined tonnage of 9,838 to the bottom. U-40 was at Fiume at war's end and was surrendered at Venice in March 1919. She was granted to Italy as a war reparation and broken up the following year.

== Design and construction ==
Austria-Hungary's U-boat fleet was largely obsolete at the outbreak of World War I. The Austro-Hungarian Navy satisfied its most urgent needs by purchasing five Type UB I submarines that comprised the U-10 class from Germany, by raising and recommissioning the sunken French submarine Curie as U-14, (Note: Curie had been caught in an anti-submarine net while trying to enter the harbor at Pola on 20 December 1914. See: Gardiner, p. 343.) and by building four submarines of the U-20 class that were based on the 1911 Danish Havmanden class. (Note: The plans for the Danish Havmanden class submarines, three of which were built in Austria-Hungary, were seized from Whitehead & Co. in Fiume. See: Gardiner, pp. 344, 354.)

After these steps alleviated their most urgent needs, the Austro-Hungarian Navy selected the German Type UB II design for its newest submarines in mid 1915. The Germans were reluctant to allocate any of their wartime resources to Austro-Hungarian construction, but were willing to sell plans for up to six of the UB II boats to be constructed under license in Austria-Hungary. The Navy agreed to the proposal and purchased the plans from AG Weser of Bremen.

U-40 displaced 264 metric tons (260 long tons) surfaced and 301 metric tons (296 long tons) submerged. She had a single hull with saddle tanks, and was 121 feet 1 inch (36.91 m) long with a beam of 14 feet 4 inches (4.37 m) and a draft of 12 feet 2 inches (3.71 m). For propulsion, she had two shafts, twin diesel engines of 270 bhp (200 kW) for surface running, and twin electric motors of 280 shp (210 kW) for submerged travel. She was capable of 9 knots (16.7 km/h) while surfaced and 7.5 knots (13.9 km/h) while submerged. Although there is no specific notation of a range for U-40 in Conway's All the World's Fighting Ships 1906–1921, the German UB II boats, upon which the U-27 class was based, had a range of over 6,000 nautical miles (11,000 km) at 5 knots (9.3 km/h) surfaced, and 45 nautical miles (83 km) at 4 knots (7.4 km/h) submerged. U-27-class boats were designed for a crew of 23–24.

U-40 was armed with two 45 cm (17.7 in) bow torpedo tubes and could carry a complement of four torpedoes. She was also equipped with a 75 mm/26 (3.0 in) deck gun and an 8 mm (0.31 in) machine gun.

U-40 was ordered from Cantiere Navale Triestino (CNT) after funds for her purchase were raised and donated to the Austro-Hungarian Navy by the Österreichischen Flottenverein. She was laid down on 8 August 1916 at the Pola Navy Yard, (Note: By this time, the CNT shipyards at Monfalcone had been overrun by the Italian Army. See: Baumgartner and Sieche, as excerpted here (reprinted and translated into English by Sieche). Retrieved 17 January 2008.) and launched on 21 April 1917.

== Service career ==
U-40 underwent diving trials on 3 July 1917, reaching a depth of 50 metres (160 ft). One month later, on 4 August, the SM U-40 was commissioned into the Austro-Hungarian Navy under the command of Linienschiffsleutnant Johann Krsnjavi. Previously in command of U-11, Krsnjavi was a 30-year-old native of Đakovo (the present-day Đakovo in Croatia).

U-40 departed on her first patrol on 5 August, sailing through the Brioni islands. Two days out, the submarine came under attack by two aircraft. Bombs from the two planes damaged one of U-40's fuel tanks but the U-boat was able to continue to her Mediterranean patrol area. There, east of Malta, she unsuccessfully attacked a steamer on the 15th. Four days later—a little more than two weeks after the U-boat's commissioning—Krsnjavi and U-40 achieved their first kills. Gartness, a British steamer of 2,422 gross register tons (GRT), was transporting manganese ore, lead, and arsenic from Ergasteria for Middlesbrough when torpedoed by U-40 some 140 nautical miles (260 km) southeast of Malta. The ship's master and twelve other crewmen were killed in the attack.

Ten days later, after a rendezvous with sister boat U-32 in the Ionian Sea, U-40 damaged the collier Clifftower in a torpedo attack. Clifftower, carrying a load of coal from Newcastle, suffered no casualties in the attack. After successfully passing through the Otranto Barrage on 31 August, U-40 concluded her first patrol when she docked at Cattaro on 3 September. On 15 October, U-40 set out from Cattaro on her next patrol. She spent two days, 16 to 18 October, patrolling off Durazzo. Departing there, she headed for her assigned patrol area off Port Said. On 20 October, two aircraft from Corfu forced Krsnjavi to make an emergency dive, but the U-boat escaped damage. On 25 October, U-40 encountered a severe storm that damager one of her fuel tanks. Three days later, Krsnjavi ordered the boat back to port when the gyrocompass broke. The boat made Cattaro on 1 November and underwent repairs there over the next five weeks.

Departing from Cattaro on her third patrol on 10 December, Krsnjavi steered the boat to her patrol area: cruising the Mediterranean between Alexandria and Malta. The first day of the new year brought U-40's next success. On 1 January 1918, the 5,134 GRT Sandon Hall, a British steamer headed from Basra to London with a cargo of linseed oil and dates, was sent to the bottom 22 nautical miles (41 km) north-northeast of Linosa. A torpedo attack two days later on another steamer produced no result. Having exhausted her supply of torpedoes, U-40 headed back to port. On 6 January, the U-boat's deck gun was used to destroy a floating mine. The following day the boat was fired upon by three drifters of the Otranto Barrage but safely returned to Cattaro on 8 January.

After two month at Cattaro, Krsnjavi lead U-40 out on her fourth patrol on 5 March. The U-boat came under attack on consecutive days while headed into the Mediterranean. On 9 March, two destroyers forced her to crash dive, while the following day a pair of aircraft did the same. Nine days later, U-40 torpedoed the Canadian steamer Lord Ormonde, but only damaged the 3,914 GRT ship. On 20 March, U-40 sent the Greek cargo ship Antonios M. Theophilatos and her load of ammunition to the bottom. (Note: Uboat.net attributes the sinking of Antonios M. Theophilatos to the German U-boat U-33, which was operating in the same area. See: Helgason, Guðmundur. "Ships hit during WWI: Antonios M. Theophilatos". German and Austrian U-boats of World War I - Kaiserliche Marine - Uboat.net.) U-40 launched a torpedo attack and damaged a British steamer Demodocus in a convoy on 23 March. U-40 ended her patrol on 2 April at Cattaro. Gibson and Prendergast report on the claim of the Italian torpedo boat Ardea that she had depth charged and sunk U-40 in the Adriatic on 26 April. As Gibson and Prendergast note, U-40 did not sink that day, discrediting the report. U-40 did depart from Cattaro for Pola at the end of May to undergo repairs for the next two months.

U-40 departed from Pola on 5 August, but developed a leak a few days out and put in at Cattaro on 10 August. The U-boat returned to Pola about two weeks later and remained there until October. While at Pola, command of U-40 passed to Linienschiffsleutnant Wladimir Pfeifer on 19 September. The 27-year-old native of Leskovec (in present-day Slovenia), was previously in command of U-17 and had, like Krsnjavi, also served a stint as commander of U-11. On 19 October, U-40 departed Pola and eventually arrived at Fiume, where she remained through the end of the war. The U-boat was taken to Venice on 23 March 1919, where she was surrendered to the Italians as a war reparation. She was scrapped at Venice the following year. In her 15-month service career, U-40 sank three ships with a combined tonnage of 9,838, and damaged three others.

== Summary of raiding history ==
Ships sunk or damaged by SM U-40
| Date | Name | Nationality | Tonnage | Fate |
|---|---|---|---|---|
| 19 August 1917 | Gartness | United Kingdom | 2,422 | Sunk |
| 29 August 1917 | Clifftower | United Kingdom | 3,509 | Damaged |
| 1 January 1918 | Sandon Hall | United Kingdom | 5,134 | Sunk |
| 20 March 1918 | Antonios M. Theophilatos | Greece | 2,282 | Sunk |
| 20 March 1918 | Lord Ormonde | Canada | 3,914 | Damaged |
| 23 March 1918 | Demodocus | United Kingdom | 6,689 | Damaged |
| | | Sunk: Damaged: Total: | 9,838; 14,112; 23,950 | |

== Bibliography ==
- Baumgartner, Lothar; Erwin Sieche (1999). Die Schiffe der k.(u.)k. Kriegsmarine im Bild = Austro-Hungarian warships in photographs (in German). Wien: Verlagsbuchhandlung Stöhr. ISBN 978-3-901208-25-6. OCLC 43596931.
- Gardiner, Robert; Gray, Randal, eds. (1985). Conway's All the World's Fighting Ships 1906–1921. Annapolis, Maryland: Naval Institute Press. ISBN 978-0-87021-907-8. OCLC 12119866.
- Gibson, R. H.; Prendergast, Maurice (2003) [1931]. The German Submarine War, 1914–1918. Annapolis, Maryland: Naval Institute Press. ISBN 978-1-59114-314-7. OCLC 52924732.
- Halpern, Paul G. (1994). A Naval History of World War I. Annapolis, Maryland: Naval Institute Press. ISBN 978-0-87021-266-6. OCLC 28411665.
- Tennent, A. J. (2006) [1990]. British Merchant Ships Sunk by U boats in the 1914–1918 War. Penzance: Periscope Publishing. ISBN 1-904381-36-7.
