= U-10-class submarine =

Austro-Hungarian Navy submarines during WWI

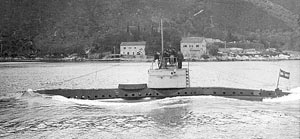
- SM U-10, the class leader of the U-10 class

Class overview
- Builders: Germaniawerft, Kiel (1); AG Weser, Bremen (4)
- Operators: Austro-Hungarian Navy
- Preceded by: U-7 class
- Succeeded by: U-14
- Built: 1914–1915
- In commission: 1915–1918
- Completed: 5
- Lost: 1
- Preserved: 0

General characteristics
- Type: submarine
- Displacement: 127 tonnes (125 long tons) surfaced; 141 tonnes (139 long tons) submerged
- Length: 27.88 m (91 ft 6 in) (o/a); 23.62 m (77 ft 6 in) pressure hull to 92 ft 2 in (28.09 m)
- Beam: 3.15 m (10 ft 4 in)
- Draught: 3.03 m (9 ft 11 in)
- Propulsion: 1 × shaft; 1 × diesel engine, 60 bhp (45 kW); 1 × electric motor, 120 shp (89 kW)
- Speed: 6.5 knots (12.0 km/h; 7.5 mph) surfaced; 5.5 knots (10.2 km/h; 6.3 mph) submerged
- Range: 1,500 nmi (2,800 km; 1,700 mi) at 5 knots (9.3 km/h; 5.8 mph) surfaced; 45 nmi (83 km; 52 mi) at 4 knots (7.4 km/h; 4.6 mph) submerged
- Complement: 17
- Armament: 2 × 45 cm (17.7 in) torpedo tubes (both in front); 2 torpedoes

The U-10 class was a class of five submarines or U-boats of the Austro-Hungarian Navy (German: Kaiserliche und Königliche Kriegsmarine or K.u.K. Kriegsmarine) during World War I. The class was similar to the German Type UB I submarine of the German Imperial Navy (German: Kaiserliche Marine); the first two boats delivered to Austria-Hungary had previously been commissioned in the German Navy.

The U-10 class as a whole did not have much wartime success, two of the boats sinking no ships. Only one boat, U-15 sank more than 1,000 combined tonnage of enemy ships. Of the five submarines of the class, only U-16 was sunk during the war; the remaining four were delivered as war reparations and broken up by 1920.

== Background ==
The Austro-Hungarian Navy's U-boat fleet at the beginning of World War I consisted of six largely experimental submarines, two of which were not operational. (Note: U-1 and U-2 were in drydock awaiting diesel engines to replace their inadequate gasoline engines. See: Gardiner, pp. 340–41.) The Navy did have five U-7-class submarines under construction in Germany, but a perceived inability to sail the completed submarines past Gibraltar to the naval base at Pola led to a hasty decision to sell them to Germany, (Note: In April 1915, some five months after the sale of the U-7 boats, the German U-boat U-21 successfully sailed into the Mediterranean via Gibraltar, proving that delivery of the U-7 boats to Austria-Hungary would have been possible. See: Gardiner, p. 343.) a severe setback for Austria-Hungary's U-boat fleet.

In order to bolster their fleet, which had already been boosted by the recovery and commissioning of the French submarine Curie as U-14 in 1915, the Austro-Hungarian Navy purchased five German UB-type coastal submarines, which had the advantages of short construction time and the ability to be shipped by rail—which avoided the perceived pitfalls of sea delivery. (Note: The performance of the German Type UB I U-boats was well known in Austria because the Imperial German Navy submarines UB-3, UB-8, and UB-9 had been shipped from Germany and assembled and launched at Pola. See Gardiner, p. 341.) The first contract in February 1915 secured the purchase of U-10 and U-11, initially commissioned as the German Type UB I U-boats UB-1 and UB-15, respectively. A further contract on 1 April 1915, purchased three more boats, U-15, U-16, and U-17.

== Design and construction ==
The U-10-class boats were small coastal submarines that displaced 125.5 long tons (127.5 t) surfaced and 140.25 long tons (142.50 t) submerged. For propulsion, they featured a single shaft, a single 60 bhp (45 kW) diesel engine for surface running, and a single 120 shp (89 kW) electric motor for submerged travel. The boats were capable of 6.5 to 7.5 knots (12.0 to 13.9 km/h; 7.5 to 8.6 mph) while surfaced and 5.5 to 6.2 knots (10.2 to 11.5 km/h; 6.3 to 7.1 mph) while submerged at a diving depth of up to 50 metres (160 ft). All five had slightly different conning tower configurations, but were all designed for a crew of 17 officers and men.

The lead boat of the class, U-10, was built by Germaniawerft of Kiel, while the other four were constructed by AG Weser of Bremen. All five were transported by rail in sections to the navy yard at Pola, where they only needed riveting together to be complete, a process that typically took about two weeks.

U-10 was the first ship of the class launched, as the German UB-1 on 22 January 1915. The other four boats were launched by April. UB-1 and UB-15 were initially commissioned into the Kaiserliche Marine in January and April, respectively, each with German commanders and crew, but with an Austro-Hungarian Navy officer for piloting and training purposes, but both were commissioned into the K.u.K. Kriegsmarine with Austro-Hungarian crews by July. The other three ships were never manned by German crews and had all been commissioned by early October when each is listed in sources with a commanding officer.

== Armament ==
The U-10-class boats were equipped with two 45 cm (17.7 in) torpedo tubes located in the front and carried a complement of two torpedoes. The German Type UB I submarines were additionally equipped with a 8 mm (0.31 in) machine gun, but it is not clear from sources if U-10 and U-11, the former German boats, were either equipped with them or, if so, retained them in Austro-Hungarian service. In October 1916, all the boats except U-11 received 37 mm/23 (1.5 in) quick-firing (QF) guns. U-11 received a 66 mm (2.6 in)/18 gun originally planned for U-14 (which received a larger gun instead). In November 1917, the 37 mm guns were replaced by 47 mm (1.9 in)/33 QF guns.

== War activities ==
All five boats of the U-10 class took part in the war, but, as a class, had limited success. Although UB-1 and UB-15 had each had sunk a single ship while commissioned in the German Imperial Navy during 1915, neither boat sank any ships in Austro-Hungarian service. U-17 sunk two ships, the unidentified sailing vessel, which sank on 1 January 1916 and the Italian destroyer Impetuoso, which sank on 10 July 1916. U-16 sank or captured two small sailing ships in late 1915 and torpedoed and sank the Italian destroyer Nembo on 16 October 1916. U-15 was the most successful of the class, sinking six ships for a total of 8,044 GRT and 745 tons. On a single day, 25 June 1916, U-15 sank the Italian auxiliary cruiser Citta di Messina and the French destroyer Fourche in the Strait of Otranto, accounting for almost half of her wartime successes.

Of the five boats, only U-16 was sunk during the war, shortly after sinking Nembo. The only other casualty among the class involved U-10, which hit a mine near Caorle and was beached with heavy damage. Although she was looted by Austro-Hungarian Army troops, she was later towed to Trieste for repairs which remained incomplete at the war's end. After the end of fighting in November 1918, the four surviving class members—U-10, U-11, U-15, and U-17—were all turned over to Italy as war reparations and scrapped at Pola by 1920.

== Class members ==
=== SM U-10 ===
SM U-10 was the lead boat of the U-10 class of submarines for the Austro-Hungarian Navy, but was originally named UB-1 as a part of the German Imperial Navy. She was laid down on 1 November 1914 in Germany and shipped by rail to Pola where she was assembled and launched on 22 January 1915. Commissioned one week later as SM UB-1, she sank one Italian torpedo boat in her German service. In July, she was handed over to the Austro-Hungarian Navy and commissioned as SM U-10. She was the target of an unsuccessful torpedo attack by a British submarine in May 1917. In July 1918, U-10 hit a mine and was beached with heavy damage. She was towed to Trieste for repairs which remained unfinished at the war's end. She was handed over to Italy as a war reparation and scrapped in 1920.

=== SM U-11 ===
SM U-11 was also originally a part of the German Imperial Navy, under the name UB-15. She was laid down on 9 November 1914 in Germany and shipped by rail to Pola where she was assembled, launched, and commissioned as SM UB-15 on 11 April 1915. In her only wartime success, she sank an Italian submarine in German service in early June. Shortly thereafter, she was delivered to the Austro-Hungarian Navy and commissioned as SM U-11 on 14 June. In early 1916, U-11 made a torpedo attack on a British submarine but missed. She was delivered to Italy as a war reparation and scrapped in 1920.

=== SM U-15 ===
SM U-15 was constructed in Germany and shipped by rail to Pola where she was assembled and launched in September 1915 and commissioned on 6 October. U-15 was the most successful boat of the U-10 class, sinking six ships totaling 8,044 GRT and 745 tons. She survived the war and was ceded to Italy as a war reparation and scrapped in 1920.

=== SM U-16 ===
SM U-16 was constructed in Germany and shipped by rail to Pola where she was assembled and launched on 26 April 1915 and commissioned on 6 October. U-16 sank one ship in November 1915 and seized another in December. While operating in the Adriatic off the coast of Albania in mid-October 1916, U-16 sank an Italian destroyer acting as a convoy escort. U-16 was sunk in the ensuing action, but sources are not clear on the exact cause of her sinking.

=== SM U-17 ===
SM U-17 was constructed in Germany and shipped by rail to Pola where she was assembled and launched on 21 April 1915 and commissioned on 6 October. U-17 sank an unidentified sailing vessel in January 1916 and sank an Italian destroyer in July 1916 as part of an effort to disrupt the Otranto Barrage. The boat survived the war and was delivered to Italy as a war reparation and scrapped in 1920.

== Bibliography ==
- Gardiner, Robert, ed. (1985). Conway's All the World's Fighting Ships 1906–1921. Annapolis, Maryland: Naval Institute Press. ISBN 978-0-87021-907-8. OCLC 12119866.
- Messimer, Dwight R. (2002). Verschollen : World War I U-boat losses. Annapolis, Maryland: Naval Institute Press. ISBN 978-1-55750-475-3. OCLC 231973419.
