= UB3 =

UB3 may refer to:

- UB3, a postcode district in the UB postcode area
- SM UB-3, World War I German submarine
