= SM U-17 (Austria-Hungary) =

Austro-Hungarian Navy's U-1-class submarine

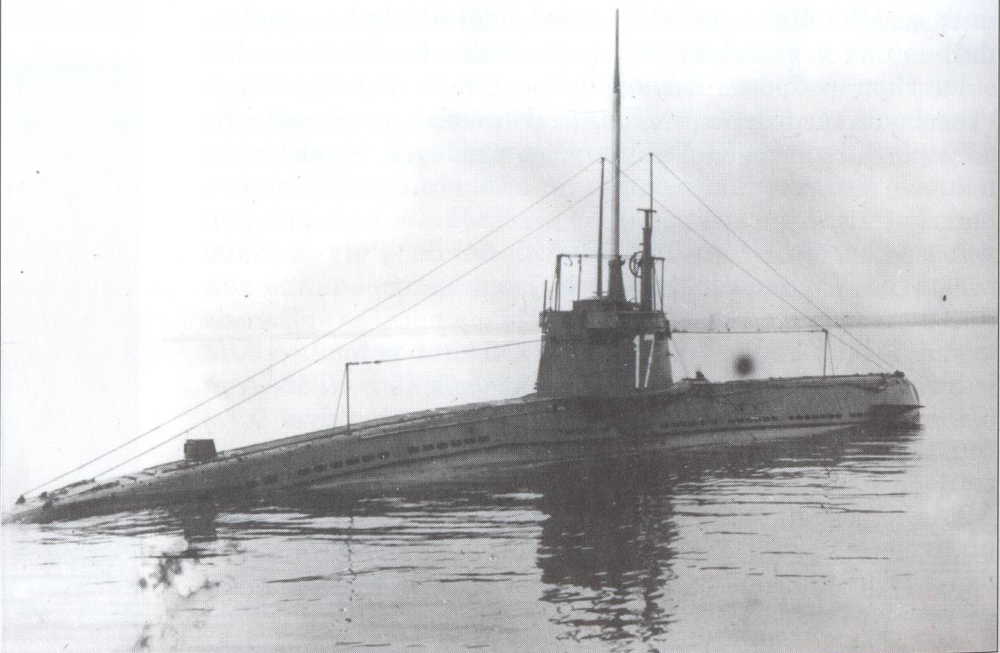
- SM U-17 on her first sortie

History

Austria-Hungary
- Name: SM U-17
- Ordered: 1 April 1915
- Builder: AG Weser, Bremen
- Yard number: 234
- Laid down: April 1915
- Completed: 30 September 1915
- Commissioned: 6 October 1915
- Fate: Turned over to Italy, scrapped by 1920

Service record
- Commanders: Franz Skopinic; 6 October – 9 December 1915; Zdenko Hudeček; 9 December 1915 – 17 September 1916; Franz Rzemenowsky von Trautenegg; 17 September – 9 October 1916; Zdenko Hudeček; 9 October – 19 December 1916; Karl Edler von Unczowski; 19 December 1916 – 6 January 1917; Zdenko Hudeček; 6 January – 26 February 1917; Albrecht Graf von Attems; 26 February – 12 June 1917; Hermann Rigele; 12 June – 22 November 1917; Wladimir Pfeifer; 22 November 1917 – 26 August 1918
- Victories: 1 merchant ship sunk (40 GRT); 1 warship sunk (680 tons)

General characteristics
- Class & type: U-10-class submarine
- Displacement: 127 tonnes (125 long tons) surfaced; 141 tonnes (139 long tons) submerged
- Length: 28.10 m (92 ft 2 in) (o/a); 23.62 m (77 ft 6 in) pressure hull
- Beam: 3.15 m (10 ft 4 in)
- Draught: 3.03 m (9 ft 11 in)
- Propulsion: 1 × shaft; 1 × Daimler diesel engine, 60 bhp (45 kW); 1 × electric motor, 120 shp (89 kW)
- Speed: 6.5 knots (12.0 km/h; 7.5 mph) surfaced; 5.5 knots (10.2 km/h; 6.3 mph) submerged
- Range: 1,500 nmi (2,800 km; 1,700 mi) at 5 kn (9.3 km/h; 5.8 mph) surfaced; 45 nmi (83 km; 52 mi) at 4 kn (7.4 km/h; 4.6 mph) submerged
- Complement: 17
- Armament: 2 × 45 cm (17.7 in) torpedo tubes (both in front); 2 torpedoes; 1 × 37 mm/23 (1.5 in) QF gun, October 1916; 1 × 47 mm (1.9 in)/33 QF gun, November 1917

SM U-17 or U-XVII was a U-10-class submarine or U-boat of the Austro-Hungarian Navy (German: Kaiserliche und Königliche Kriegsmarine or K.u.K. Kriegsmarine) during World War I. U-17 was laid down in Germany in April 1915 and shipped in sections by rail to Pola in August, where she was assembled. She was delivered to the Austro-Hungarian Navy at the end of September and commissioned in October 1915.

U-17 primarily operated from Cattaro, patrolling off the Italian and Albanian coasts. The submarine had several opportunities to sink merchant ships and warships throughout the war, but could only sink one unidentified sailing vessel in January 1916 and one Italian destroyer in July 1916 as part of an effort to disrupt the Otranto Barrage. At the end of the war, U-17 was undergoing repairs at Pola. She was handed over to Italy as a war reparation and scrapped in 1920.

== Design and construction ==
U-17 was a small, coastal submarine that displaced 125.5 long tons (127.5 t) surfaced and 140.25 long tons (142.50 t) submerged. She featured a single shaft, a single 60 bhp (45 kW) Daimler diesel engine for surface running, and a single 120 shp (89 kW) electric motor for submerged travel. U-17 was capable of up to 6.5 knots (12.0 km/h; 7.5 mph) while surfaced and 5.5 knots (10.2 km/h; 6.3 mph) while submerged at a diving depth of up to 50 metres (160 ft). She was designed for a crew of 17 officers and men.

U-17 was equipped with two 45 cm (17.7 in) torpedo tubes located in the front and carried a complement of two torpedoes. In October 1916, U-17's armament was supplemented with a 37 mm/23 (1.5 in) quick-firing (QF) gun. This gun was replaced by a 47 mm (1.9 in)/33 QF gun in November 1917.

U-17 was ordered by the Austro-Hungarian Navy on 1 April 1915 and laid down at AG Weser in Bremen later that month. When completed, the submarine was broken down into sections, loaded onto railcars, and shipped to the Austro-Hungarian Navy's main base at Pola on 30 August. After completing the four-day journey, the sections were riveted together. Though there is no specific mention of how long it took for U-17's sections to be assembled, a sister boat, the German Type UB I submarine UB-3, shipped to Pola from Germany in mid-April 1915, was assembled in about two weeks. (Note: The Austro-Hungarian U-10 class and the German Type UB I were virtually identical.) U-17 was delivered to the Austro-Hungarian Navy on 30 September.

== Operational history ==
SM U-17 was commissioned into the Austro-Hungarian Navy on 6 October under the command of Linienschiffsleutnant Franz Skopinic. (Note: Two of U-16's sister ships, SM U-15 and SM U-16, were commissioned the same day.) The boat patrolled the Italian coast out of Pola for most of the next two months, interrupted by engine repairs in mid November. On 9 December, Skopinic was succeeded as U-17's commanding officer by Linienschiffsleutnant Zdenko Hudeček.

By the end of December, U-17 was operating from Cattaro and patrolling off the Albanian and Montenegrin coasts. Hudeček and U-17 made two unsuccessful attacks on enemy destroyers in January. On 23 February, Hudeček attempted an attack on a cargo ship off Durazzo, but was discovered and depth charged. Two days later the submarine put into Cattaro to replace a broken gyrocompass with a new magnetic compass. In mid-March, U-17 shifted to patrol off the Italian coast once again and was attacked by air on 15 March off Brindisi. The Italian patrols continued until late May, when U-17 was sent to patrol in the Ionian Sea. Duty in the Straits of Otranto followed in June, as part of the plan to disrupt the Otranto Barrage. On 12 June, the submarine attempted an attack on an Italian Orfeo-class torpedo boat; the torpedo boat survived and repaid U-17 by dropping several depth charges nearby. On 10 July, U-17 torpedoed and sank the 680-metric-ton (750-short-ton) Italian destroyer Impetuoso, The Italian ship had been guarding drifters, small fishing vessels with anti-submarine nets stretched between them as part of the Otranto Barrage. Impetuoso was the only ship sunk by U-17. The U-boat continued patrols in the Adriatic throughout the remainder of 1916. U-17 was depth charged by a destroyer off Fano on 14 September. Two days later, a failed attack on a steamer resulted in another depth charging of U-17, this time by an Orfeo-class torpedo boat. In early October, an air attack by two airplanes damaged U-17.

The year 1917 was uneventful for U-17. The submarine resumed patrols off Albania in January. In May, the U-boat had to crash dive near Valona when a bomber appeared overhead and dropped its payload. A foray to Bari in July provided another opportunity to attack a steamer, but the torpedoes missed their mark. On 16 August, U-17, by now under the command of Linienschiffsleutnant Hermann Rigele, attempted a torpedo attack on a cargo ship off Saseno. At the end of October, U-17 escaped damage from a torpedo attack by an enemy submarine near Cape Menders, Albania. A month later, the submarine was once again attacked by air, surviving two bombs dropped from a single airplane.

In the first part of June 1918, U-17 patrolled off the coast of Italy, but had returned to Cattaro on 12 June. Two weeks later, the boat set out for Pola to undergo repairs. At the end of the war, the ship's repairs remained unfinished. U-17, at Pola with six other Austro-Hungarian submarines, was ceded to Italy as a war reparation. (Note: The other six submarines at Pola were U-1, U-2, U-11, U-15, U-27, and U-32.) U-17 was broken up at Pola by the Italians in 1920.

== Summary of raiding history ==
Date	Name	Nationality	Tonnage (Note: Merchant ship tonnages are in gross register tons. Military vessels are listed by tons displacement.)	Fate
1 January 1916	Unidentified Sailing Vessel	Unknown	40	Sunk
10 July 1916	Impetuoso	Regia Marina	680	Sunk

== Bibliography ==
- Bendert, Harald (2000). Die UB-Boote der Kaiserlichen Marine, 1914-1918. Einsätze, Erfolge, Schicksal (in German). Hamburg: Verlag E.S. Mittler & Sohn GmbH. ISBN 3-8132-0713-7.
- Gröner, Erich; Jung, Dieter; Maass, Martin (1991). U-boats and Mine Warfare Vessels. German Warships 1815–1945. Vol. 2. Translated by Thomas, Keith; Magowan, Rachel. London: Conway Maritime Press. ISBN 0-85177-593-4.
- Baumgartner, Lothar; Erwin Sieche (1999). Die Schiffe der k.(u.)k. Kriegsmarine im Bild = Austro-Hungarian warships in photographs (in German). Wien: Verlagsbuchhandlung Stöhr. ISBN 978-3-901208-25-6. OCLC 43596931.
- Compton-Hall, Richard (2004) [1991]. Submarines at War, 1914–18. Penzance: Periscope Publishing. ISBN 978-1-904381-21-1. OCLC 57639764.
- Gardiner, Robert; Gray, Randal, eds. (1985). Conway's All the World's Fighting Ships 1906-1921. Annapolis, Maryland: Naval Institute Press. ISBN 978-0-87021-907-8. OCLC 12119866.
- Gibson, R. H.; Prendergast, Maurice (2003) [1931]. The German Submarine War, 1914–1918. Annapolis, Maryland: Naval Institute Press. ISBN 978-1-59114-314-7. OCLC 52924732.
- Messimer, Dwight R. (2002). Verschollen: World War I U-boat Losses. Annapolis, Maryland: Naval Institute Press. ISBN 978-1-55750-475-3. OCLC 231973419.
