= UB1 =

UB1 may refer to:

- UB1, a postcode district in the UB postcode area
- SM UB-1, a German Type UB I submarine active in World War I
- UB1 File format used by Roadhawk in-car video recorder to store video, audio and GPS Data.
