= SM UB-43 =

German Imperial Navy's Type UB II submarine

- UB-43 in port, c. 1915–16

History

German Empire
- Name: UB-43
- Ordered: 31 July 1915
- Builder: AG Weser, Bremen
- Yard number: 245
- Laid down: 3 September 1915
- Launched: 8 April 1916
- Commissioned: 24 April 1916
- Decommissioned: 21 July 1917
- Fate: Sold to Austria-Hungary

Service record as UB-43
- Part of: Pola / Mittelmeer Flotilla; 24 April 1916 – 15 July 1917
- Commanders: Oblt. Dietrich Niebuhr; 24 April – 28 August 1916; Kptlt. Hans von Mellenthin; 29 August 1916 – 8 April 1917; Oblt. Horst Obermüller; 9 April – 15 July 1917
- Operations: 10 patrols
- Victories: 22 merchant ships sunk (99,176 GRT); 1 warship damaged (7,350 tons)

Austria-Hungary
- Name: SM U-43
- Acquired: 21 July 1917
- Commissioned: 30 July 1917
- Fate: Ceded to France as war reparation, 1920; scrapped

Service record as U-43
- Commanders: Friedrich Schlosser; 30 July 1917 – 13 January 1918; Eugen Hornyák Edler von Horn; 7 February – 31 October 1918
- Victories: 1 merchant ship damaged (4,016 GRT)

General characteristics
- Class & type: As built: Type UB II submarine; After July 1917: U-43-class submarine
- Displacement: 272 t (268 long tons) surfaced; 205 t (202 long tons) submerged
- Length: 36.90 m (121 ft 1 in) o/a; 27.90 m (91 ft 6 in) pressure hull
- Beam: 4.37 m (14 ft 4 in) o/a; 3.85 m (12 ft 8 in) pressure hull
- Draught: 3.69 m (12 ft 1 in)
- Propulsion: 1 × propeller shaft; 2 × four-stroke 6-cylinder diesel engine, 284 PS (209 kW; 280 bhp); 2 × electric motor, 280 PS (210 kW; 280 shp)
- Speed: 8.82 knots (16.33 km/h; 10.15 mph) surfaced; 6.22 knots (11.52 km/h; 7.16 mph) submerged
- Range: 6,940 nmi (12,850 km; 7,990 mi) at 5 knots (9.3 km/h; 5.8 mph) surfaced; 45 nmi (83 km; 52 mi) at 4 knots (7.4 km/h; 4.6 mph) submerged
- Complement: 23
- Armament: 2 × 50 cm (19.7 in) bow torpedo tubes; 4 torpedoes; 1 × 8.8 cm (3.5 in) Uk L/30 deck gun

SM UB-43 was a Type UB II submarine or U-boat for the German Imperial Navy (German: Kaiserliche Marine) during World War I. UB-43 was sold to the Austro-Hungarian Navy (German: Kaiserliche und Königliche Kriegsmarine or K.u.K. Kriegsmarine) during the war. In Austro-Hungarian service the B was dropped from her name and she was known as SM U-43 or U-XLIII as the lead boat of the Austro-Hungarian U-43 class.

UB-43 was ordered in July 1915 and was laid down at the AG Weser shipyard in Bremen in September. UB-43 was a little more than 121 feet (37 m) in length and displaced between 270 and 305 tonnes (266 and 300 long tons), depending on whether surfaced or submerged. She was equipped to carry a complement of four torpedoes for her two bow torpedo tubes and had an 8.8-centimeter (3.5 in) deck gun. As part of a group of six submarines selected for Mediterranean service, UB-43 was broken into railcar sized components and shipped to Pola where she was assembled and launched in early April 1916, and commissioned later in the month. Over the next year the U-boat sank twenty-two ships, which included the Peninsular and Oriental liner Arabia. UB-43 also damaged the British protected cruiser HMS Grafton.

The German Imperial Navy was having difficulties filling submarine crews with trained men and offered to sell UB-43 and a sister boat, UB-47, to the Austro-Hungarian Navy. After the terms were agreed to in June 1917, both boats were handed over at Pola. When commissioned into the Austro-Hungarian Navy, the B in her designation was dropped so that she became U-43 or U-XLIII. She damaged one Italian steamer in limited Austro-Hungarian service through the end of the war. U-43 was ceded to France as a war reparation in 1920 and broken at Bizerta that same year.

== Design and construction ==
The German UB II design improved upon the design of the UB I boats, which had been ordered in September 1914. In service, the UB I boats were found to be too small and too slow. A major problem was that, because they had a single propeller shaft/engine combo, if either component failed, the U-boat became almost totally disabled. To rectify this flaw, the UB II boats featured twin propeller shafts and twin engines (one shaft for each engine), which also increased the U-boat's top speed. The new design also included more powerful batteries, larger torpedo tubes, and a deck gun. As a UB II boat, U-43 could also carry twice the torpedo load of her UB I counterparts, and nearly ten times as much fuel. To accommodate all of these changes the boats' had larger hulls, and surface and submerged displacements more than twice those of the UB I boats.

The Imperial German Navy ordered UB-43 from AG Weser on 31 July 1915 as one of a series of six UB II boats (numbered from UB-42 to UB-47) UB-43 was 36.90 metres (121 ft 1 in) long and 4.37 metres (14 ft 4 in) abeam. She had a single hull with saddle tanks and had a draft of 3.68 metres (12 ft 1 in) when surfaced. She displaced 305 tonnes (300 long tons) while submerged but only 272 tonnes (268 long tons) on the surface.

The submarine was equipped with twin Daimler diesel engines and twin Siemens-Schuckert electric motors—for surfaced and submerged running, respectively—that drove one propeller shaft. UB-43 had a surface speed of up to 8.82 knots (16.33 km/h; 10.15 mph) and could go as fast as 6.22 knots (11.52 km/h; 7.16 mph) while underwater. The U-boat could carry up to 27 tonnes (27 long tons) of diesel fuel, giving her a range of 6,940 nautical miles (12,850 km; 7,990 mi) at 5 knots (9.3 km/h; 5.8 mph) Her electric motors and batteries provided a range of 45 nautical miles (83 km; 52 mi) at 4 knots (7.4 km/h; 4.6 mph) while submerged.

UB-43 was equipped with two 50-centimeter (19.7 in) bow torpedo tubes and could carry four torpedoes. The U-boat was also armed with one 8.8 cm (3.5 in) Uk L/30 deck gun.

UB-43 was laid down by AG Weser at its Bremen shipyard on 3 September 1915. As one of six U-boats selected for service in the Mediterranean while under construction, UB-43 was broken into railcar-sized components and shipped overland to the Austro-Hungarian port of Pola. Shipyard workers from Weser assembled the boat and her five sisters at Pola, where she was launched on 8 April.

== German Imperial Navy career ==
SM UB-43 was commissioned into the German Imperial Navy on 24 April 1916 under the command of Oberleutnant zur See Dietrich Niebuhr; (Note: Oberleutnant zur See Niebuhr was in the Navy's April 1907 cadet class with 34 other future U-boat captains, including Werner Fürbringer, Heino von Heimburg, Hans Howaldt, Otto Steinbrinck, and Ralph Wenninger. See: Helgason, Guðmundur. "WWI Officer Crews: Crew 4/07". German and Austrian U-boats of World War I - Kaiserliche Marine - Uboat.net.) UB-43 was the only U-boat command for the 27-year-old officer. UB-43 was assigned to the Navy's Pola Flotilla (German: Deutsche U-Halbflotille Pola) in which she remained throughout her German career. Although the flotilla was based in Pola, the site of the main Austro-Hungarian Navy base, boats of the flotilla operated out of the Austro-Hungarian base at Cattaro which was located farther south and closer to the Mediterranean. German U-boats typically returned to Pola only for repairs.

Under Niebuhr's command, UB-43 had no success, and he was replaced by Kapitänleutnant Hans-Joachim von Mellenthin on 29 August. After two weeks under von Mellenthin's command, UB-43 sank her first ship. While 112 nautical miles (207 km; 129 mi) east of Malta, the British steamer Italiana with her cargo of hay destined for Salonica was torpedoed and sunk. Three days later, and some 60 nautical miles (110 km; 69 mi) closer to Malta, von Mellenthin sank a pair of British steamers. Dewa was in ballast headed for Port Said when attacked by UB-43; three of the steamer's crew lost their lives in the attack. Lord Tredegar was carrying a general cargo when she was sent down with the loss of four men. The Wall Street Journal reported that the sinking of Lord Tredegar resulted in a loss of $1,000,000 for her American insurer.

In October, von Mellenthin and UB-43 sank an additional two ships. On 10 October, the British tanker Elax, carrying fuel oil from Rangoon was sunk off Cape Matapan without casualties. Three days later, two men were killed when UB-43 torpedoed and sank their ship, the British steamer Welsh Prince, of 4,934 gross register tons (GRT).

On 18 November, the British Admiralty, released a report that listed all of UB-43's first five victims as evidence of German wrongdoing. According to the British report, Italiana, Dewa, Lord Tredegar, and Elax—four of the twenty-two ships listed—had all been torpedoed without warning. This type of attack was counter to German pledges to adhere cruiser warfare, which required that ships be allowed time for the crews to escape before any attack could commence. UB-43's fifth victim, Welsh Prince, was on another list of 107 British ships sunk whose lifeboats had been fired upon by German submarines.

In the meantime, UB-43 had continued sinking British ships, sending down five in a nine-day span in early November. Statesman, a 6,153 GRT steamer carrying a general cargo, was first on 3 November; six crewmen were killed when the ship went down 200 nautical miles (370 km; 230 mi) east of Malta. The following day, the 3,937 GRT Clan Leslie and the 5,398 GRT Huntsvale were sunk in the same area. Clan Leslie was carrying a general cargo from Bombay when sunk with three casualties. Seven were killed when Huntsvale, traveling in ballast for Algiers, was sunk.

RMS Arabia, a Peninsular and Oriental liner, was sunk by UB-43 on 6 November 1916.

On 6 November, UB-43 torpedoed the Peninsular and Oriental liner Arabia 112 nautical miles (207 km; 129 mi) off Cape Matapan. According to contemporary news accounts, gunners on Arabia fired upon UB-43 after the liner was torpedoed, but recorded no hits. All 437 passengers aboard the steamer, en route from Sydney to London when attacked, were rescued after an hour in the water. The liner went down 90 minutes after the torpedo struck. Eleven died in the attack, including two of Arabia's engineers killed in the initial blast of the torpedo. Six days after Arabia's sinking, UB-43 sank the 3,383 GRT British steamer Kapunda east of Malta. Kapunda's loss brought the U-boat's November tally to 26,774 gross register tons, which accounted for more than 15% of the November tally for all German U-boats in the Mediterranean.

UB-43 and von Mellenthin sank three more British steamers in December: Bretwalda on the 13th, and Russian and Westminster on the 14th. Bretwalda—which had escaped destruction from a mine laid by UC-5 in August 1915—and her cargo of jute were sent down 220 nautical miles (410 km; 250 mi) from Malta. Russian, at 8,825 GRT, was the largest ship sunk by UB-43; the horse transport ship was sailing in ballast from Salonica when she went down with 28 of her crewmen. After UB-43 torpedoed Westminster, the U-boat shelled the survivors in their lifeboats, according to authors R. H. Gibson and Maurice Prendergast. Fifteen men from Westminster died in the sinking.

UB-43 sank no ships over the next eight weeks. Author Paul Halpern reports that the majority of the German U-boats in the Mediterranean fleet were undergoing repairs and refits at Pola and Cattaro during January. Although no specific mention is made of repairs done on UB-43, the U-boat's inactivity in this period may be for that reason.

=== Unrestricted submarine warfare ===
On 1 February 1917, Kaiser Wilhelm II personally approved a resumption of unrestricted submarine warfare in order to try to force the British to make peace. The new rules of engagement specified that no ship was to be left afloat, (Note: Since the early stages of the war, the British had blockaded Germany, preventing neutral shipping from reaching German ports. By the time of the so-called "turnip winter" of 1916–17, the blockade had severely limited imports of food and fuel into Germany. Among the results were an increase in infant mortality and as many as 700,000 deaths attributed to starvation or hypothermia during the war. See: Tarrant, pp. 44–45.) although British reports for several of UB-43's victims suggest that von Mellenthin was already operating in this manner.

Under these new rules of engagement, UB-43 first sank the Greek steamer Miaoulis 130 nautical miles (240 km; 150 mi) from Benghazi on 24 February, while she was carrying cottonseed to London. Two days later, the turret hull steamer Clan Farquhar, carrying cotton and coal for London, was torpedoed and sunk. After the attack, which killed 49 of her crew, the ship's second engineer was taken captive by von Mellenthin. On the 27th, Brodmore and her cargo of frozen meat from Majunga were sunk off Libya (and her master taken prisoner), and on the 28th the Japanese steamer Shinsei Maru was sunk nearby.

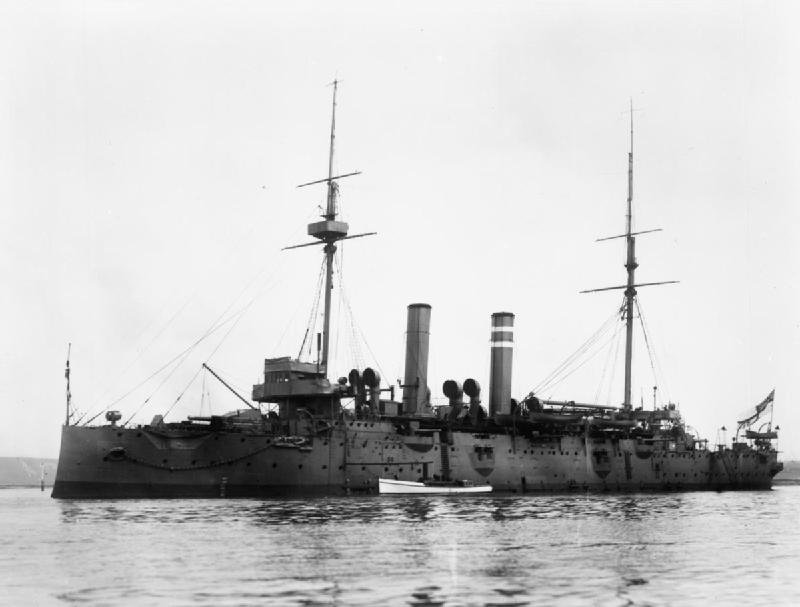
HMS Grafton, a British protected cruiser, was damaged when torpedoed by UB-43 in June 1917.

She was nearly a month later before von Mellenthin and UB-43 sank their next target. On 26 March, the British steamer Ledbury, carrying wheat from Karachi, was sunk 90 nautical miles (170 km; 100 mi) from Benghazi. Eight days later, Vasilefs Constantinos, a Greek steamer of 4,070 gross register tons (GRT), was sunk in the Ionian Sea; the Constantinos was the last ship sunk by UB-43 under von Mellenthin's command. On 9 April, von Mellenthin was succeeded by Oblt.z.S. Horst Obermüller, a 26-year-old first time U-boat commander. Under von Mellenthin's command, UB-43 had sunk 86,236 gross register tons (GRT) of merchant shipping. (Note: Von Mellenthin went on to command UB-49 (one of the earliest of the UB III U-boats) and, later, U-120, and was awarded the Pour le Mérite in February 1918. See: Helgason, Guðmundur. "Ships hit during WWI: Hans von Mellenthin". German and Austrian U-boats of World War I - Kaiserliche Marine - Uboat.net.)

On 1 May, Obermüller sank the American-owned (but British-flagged) tanker British Sun carrying a load of fuel oil. According to a report in The New York Times, the 5,565 GRT vessel, valued at $2,500,000, was "one of the finest" tankers. The collier Repton was sent down off Cape Matapan six days later; three of the British steamer's crewmen died in the attack. Later in the month, the Greek steamer Dorothy and her cargo of wheat from Karachi were sunk 45 nautical miles (83 km; 52 mi) from Cap D'Armi. UB-43's final attack of note was upon the protected cruiser HMS Grafton, torpedoed 150 nautical miles (280 km; 170 mi) east of Malta. Grafton was damaged but suffered no casualties. The 7,350-tonne (7,230-long-ton)-displacement British ship was brought safely into port at Malta.

On 21 July, UB-43 was decommissioned at Pola and handed over to the Austro-Hungarian Navy. In her German Imperial Navy career of fourteen months, UB-43 sank twenty-two merchant ships totaling 99,176 gross register tons (GRT), and damaged one warship with a displacement of 7,350 tonnes (7,230 long tons). (Note: Oberleutnant zur See Obermüller, UB-43's commander at the time she was decommissioned, went on to command the coastal minelayer UC-34 and, later, UB-132. See: Helgason, Guðmundur. "WWI U-boat commanders: Horst Obermüller". German and Austrian U-boats of World War I - Kaiserliche Marine - Uboat.net.)

== Austro-Hungarian Navy service ==
In November 1916, the German Imperial Navy, having a hard time finding trained submarine crews, inquired to find out if its ally Austria-Hungary was interested in purchasing some of its Mediterranean submarines. A general agreement led to protracted negotiations, which stalled over the outflow of Austro-Hungarian gold reserves to Germany. But, with all of the details worked out, the two parties agreed on the sale of UB-43 and sister ship UB-47 to Austria-Hungary in June 1917. (Note: UB-43 and UB-47 were not the first former Imperial German Navy submarines purchased by the Austro-Hungarian Navy. In 1915 the Austro-Hungarian Navy purchased the German U-boats UB-1 and UB-15 and commissioned them as U-10 and U-11, respectively. See: Gardiner, p. 343.)

When handed over by the Germans on 21 July, UB-43 was in a "worn out condition". Despite the rough condition of the boat, the U-boat was commissioned into the Austro-Hungarian Navy on 30 July 1917 as SM U-43, dropping the B from her former designation. Linienschiffsleutnant Friedrich Schlosser was installed as the new commander of the U-boat, which remained at Pola for the next three months undergoing repairs. Departing that port on 1 November, U-43 made way to Cattaro, and then went out on patrol. Schlosser torpedoed the Italian steamer Orione on 16 November, but the Italian ship did not sink; she was towed to safety in Taranto.

On 30 November, a leak on U-43 partially flooded the boat and caused her to sink to a depth of 100 metres (330 ft) before she was brought under control and raised to the surface. The flooding damaged the U-boat's electrical systems, preventing her from submerging on her return to port for repairs. An unidentified submarine launched a torpedo at the surfaced U-43, but the torpedo's aim was off and it passed harmlessly in front of the bow. The boat made port at Cattaro on 1 December and at Pola on 6 December for two months of repairs.

During U-43's time under repair, Schlosser was reassigned to command U-14, and Linienschiffsleutnant Eugen Hornyák Edler von Horn was named to take his place aboard U-43 on 18 January 1918. Under von Horn, U-43 patrolled off Cattaro, having to crash dive at least once to escape attack from enemy torpedo boats. On 17 March, while returning to Cattaro from patrol, the crew of the Austro-Hungarian destroyer Dinara mistook U-43 for an enemy submarine and rammed her, damaging the diving planes. U-43 sailed for Fiume for three months of repairs.

The U-boat returned to action in June and patrolled off Montenegro, Durazzo, and Cattaro for the next five months. On 13 June, U-43 was slightly damaged in an air raid on Cattaro and, on 5 September, had to crash dive to avoid another air attack while off Cattaro. On 20 September, the boat rendezvoused with U-47 and received a French prisoner of war. The prisoner was the only survivor of the French submarine Circé, which U-47 had torpedoed the night before.

At the end of the war, U-43 was at Cattaro. In her Austro-Hungarian Navy career, U-43 damaged a single merchant ship of 4,016 gross register tons. U-43 was ceded to France as a war reparation in 1920, towed to Bizerta, and broken up there within a year.

== Summary of raiding history ==
=== As the German UB-43 ===
Ships sunk or damaged by SM UB-43
Date	Name	Nationality	Tonnage (Note: Merchant ship tonnages are in gross register tons. Military vessels are listed by tons displacement)	Fate
14 September 1916	Italiana	United Kingdom	2,663	Sunk
17 September 1916	Dewa	United Kingdom	3,802	Sunk
17 September 1916	Lord Tredegar	United Kingdom	3,856	Sunk
10 October 1916	Elax	United Kingdom	3,980	Sunk
13 October 1916	Welsh Prince	United Kingdom	4,934	Sunk
3 November 1916	Statesman	United Kingdom	6,153	Sunk
4 November 1916	Clan Leslie	United Kingdom	3,937	Sunk
4 November 1916	Huntsvale	United Kingdom	5,398	Sunk
6 November 1916	Arabia	United Kingdom	7,903	Sunk
12 November 1916	Kapunda	United Kingdom	3,383	Sunk
13 December 1916	Bretwalda	United Kingdom	4,037	Sunk
14 December 1916	Russian	United Kingdom	8,825	Sunk
14 December 1916	Westminster	United Kingdom	4,342	Sunk
24 February 1917	Miaoulis	Greece	2,918	Sunk
26 February 1917	Clan Farquhar	United Kingdom	5,858	Sunk
27 February 1917	Brodmore	United Kingdom	4,071	Sunk
28 February 1917	Shinsei Maru	Japan	3,060	Sunk
26 March 1917	Ledbury	United Kingdom	3,046	Sunk
3 April 1917	Vasilefs Constantinos	Greece	4,070	Sunk
1 May 1917	British Sun	United Kingdom	5,565	Sunk
7 May 1917	Repton	United Kingdom	2,881	Sunk
26 May 1917	Dorothy	Greece	4,494	Sunk
11 June 1917	HMS Grafton	Royal Navy	7,350	Damaged
		Sunk: Damaged: Total:	99,176; 7,350; 106,526	

=== As the Austro-Hungarian U-43 ===
Ships sunk or damaged by SM U-43
Date	Name	Nationality	Tonnage	Fate
16 November 1917	Orione	Kingdom of Italy	4,016	Damaged
		Damaged:	4,016	

== Bibliography ==
- Baumgartner, Lothar; Erwin Sieche (1999). Die Schiffe der k.(u.)k. Kriegsmarine im Bild=Austro-Hungarian warships in photographs (in German). Wien: Verlagsbuchhandlung Stöhr. ISBN 978-3-901208-25-6. OCLC 43596931.
- Bendert, Harald (2000). Die UB-Boote der Kaiserlichen Marine, 1914-1918. Einsätze, Erfolge, Schicksal (in German). Hamburg: Verlag E.S. Mittler & Sohn GmbH. ISBN 3-8132-0713-7.
- Bonsor, N. R. P. (1975) [1955]. North Atlantic Seaway: An Illustrated History of the Passenger Services Linking the Old World With the New (Enlarged and revised ed.). New York: Arco. OCLC 1891992.
- Drechsel, Edwin (1994). Norddeutscher Lloyd, Bremen, 1857–1970: History, Fleet, Ship Mails. Vancouver, British Columbia: Cordillera Pub. Co. ISBN 978-1-895590-08-1. OCLC 30357825.
- Gardiner, Robert; Gray, Randal, eds. (1985). Conway's All the World's Fighting Ships 1906–1921. Annapolis, Maryland: Naval Institute Press. ISBN 978-0-87021-907-8. OCLC 12119866.
- Gibson, R. H.; Prendergast, Maurice (2003) [1931]. The German Submarine War, 1914–1918. Annapolis, Maryland: Naval Institute Press. ISBN 978-1-59114-314-7. OCLC 52924732.
- Gröner, Erich; Jung, Dieter; Maass, Martin (1991). German Warships 1815–1945, U-boats and Mine Warfare Vessels. Vol. 2. Translated by Thomas, Keith; Magowan, Rachel. London: Conway Maritime Press. ISBN 0-85177-593-4.
- Halpern, Paul G. (1994). A Naval History of World War I. Annapolis, Maryland: Naval Institute Press. ISBN 978-0-87021-266-6. OCLC 28411665.
- Messimer, Dwight R. (2002). Verschollen: World War I U-boat losses. Annapolis, Maryland: Naval Institute Press. ISBN 978-1-55750-475-3. OCLC 231973419.
- Miller, David (2002). The Illustrated Directory of Submarines of the World. St. Paul, Minnesota: MBI Pub. Co. ISBN 978-0-7603-1345-9. OCLC 50208951.
- Rössler, Eberhard (1979). Die deutschen U-Boote und ihre Werften: eine Bilddokumentation über den deutschen U-Bootbau; in zwei Bänden (in German). Vol. I. Munich: Bernard & Graefe. ISBN 3-7637-5213-7.
- Tarrant, V. E. (1989). The U-Boat Offensive: 1914–1945. Annapolis, Maryland: Naval Institute Press. ISBN 978-0-87021-764-7. OCLC 20338385.
- Williamson, Gordon (2002). U-boats of the Kaiser's Navy. Oxford: Osprey. ISBN 978-1-84176-362-0. OCLC 48627495.
