= French destroyer Fourche =

Destroyer of the French Navy

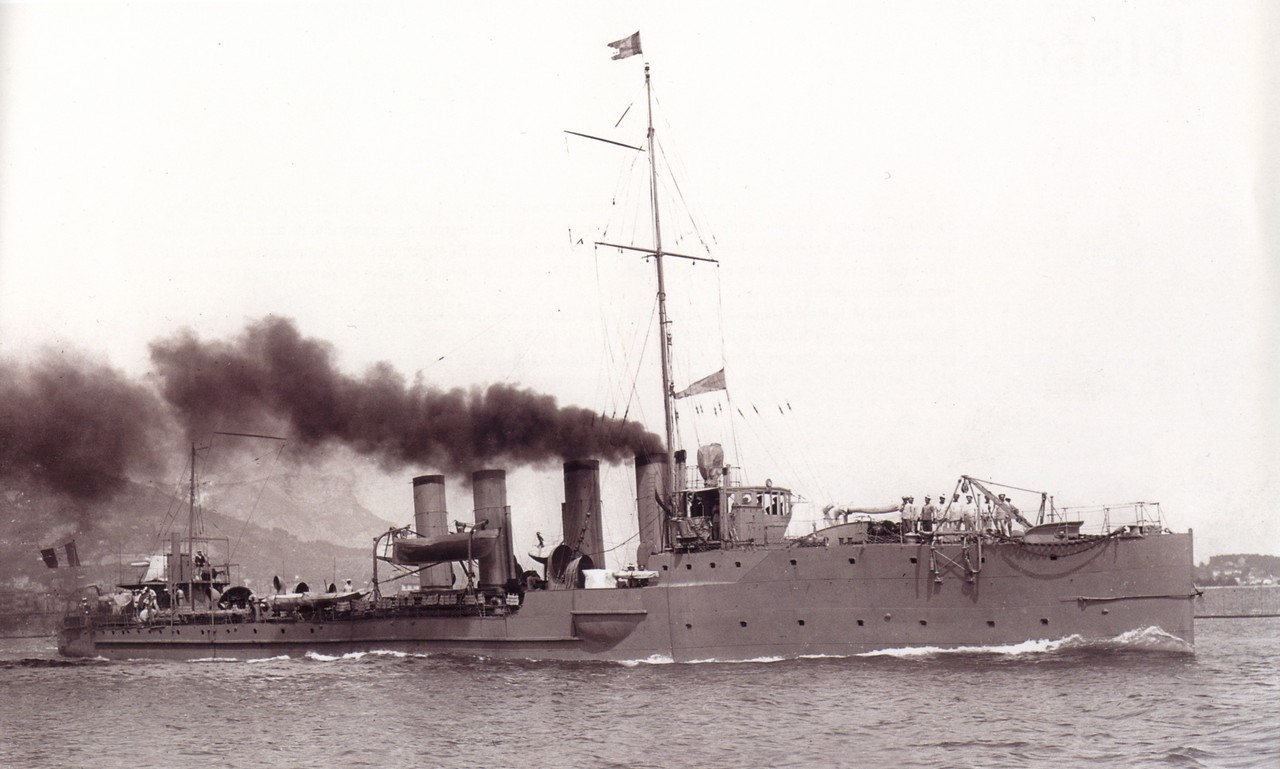
- Sister ship Bouclier underway

History

France
- Name: Fourche
- Namesake: Pitchfork
- Ordered: 26 August 1908
- Builder: Établissement de la Brosse et Fouché, Nantes
- Laid down: 1909
- Launched: 21 October 1910
- Completed: 1911
- Commissioned: 4 December 1911
- Fate: Sunk, 23 June 1916

General characteristics (as built)
- Class & type: Bouclier-class destroyer
- Displacement: 859 t (845 long tons)
- Length: 75.15 m (246 ft 7 in) (o/a)
- Beam: 7.93 m (26 ft)
- Draft: 2.89 m (9 ft 6 in)
- Installed power: 4 du Temple boilers; 12,500 shp (9,321 kW)
- Propulsion: 2 shafts; 2 steam turbines
- Speed: 30 knots (56 km/h; 35 mph)
- Range: 1,200–1,400 nmi (2,222–2,593 km; 1,381–1,611 mi) at 12–14 knots (22–26 km/h; 14–16 mph)
- Complement: 81
- Armament: 2 × 100 mm (3.9 in) Mle 1893 guns; 4 × 65 mm (2.6 in) Mle 1902 guns; 2 × twin 450 mm (17.7 in) torpedo tubes

Fourche was one of a dozen Bouclier-class destroyers built for the French Navy in the first decade of the 20th century. During the First World War, she escorted the battle fleet during the Battle of Antivari off the coast of Montenegro in August 1914 and escorted multiple convoys to Montenegro for the rest of the year. Fourche protected the evacuation of the Royal Serbian Army from Durazzo, Albania, in February 1916. The ship was sunk by an Austro-Hungarian submarine in June with the loss of 19 crewmen.

== Design and description ==
The Boucliers were the first class of destroyers designed in response to a new doctrine for their use. Nearly double the size of previous classes and more powerfully armed, they were built to a general specification and each shipyard was allowed to determine the best way to meet that specification. Fourche and her sister Faulx were built by the same shipyard and had an overall length of 75.15 meters (246 ft 7 in), a beam of 7.93 meters (26 ft), and a draft of 2.89 meters (9 ft 6 in). Fourche displaced slightly less than her sister at 859 metric tons (845 long tons) at normal load. Their crew numbered 4 officers and 77 men.

The sisters were powered by a pair of Rateau steam turbines, each driving one propeller shaft using steam provided by four du Temple boilers. The engines were designed to produce 12,500 shaft horsepower (9,300 kW) which was intended to give the ships a speed of 30 knots (56 km/h; 35 mph). During her sea trials, Fourche handily exceed that speed, reaching a speed of 32.11 knots (59.47 km/h; 36.95 mph). The ships carried enough fuel oil to give them a range of 1,200–1,400 nautical miles (2,222–2,593 km; 1,381–1,611 mi) at cruising speeds of 12–14 knots (22–26 km/h; 14–16 mph).

The primary armament of the Bouclier-class ships consisted of two 100-millimeter (3.9 in) Modèle 1893 guns in single mounts, one each fore and aft of the superstructure, and four 65-millimeter (2.6 in) Modèle 1902 guns distributed amidships. They were also fitted with two twin mounts for 450-millimeter (17.7 in) torpedo tubes amidships, one on each broadside.

== Construction and career ==
Fourche was ordered on 26 August 1908 as part of the 1908 naval program from Établissement de la Brosse et Fouché. She was laid down at the company's shipyard at Nantes, Brittany, in 1909. The ship was launched on 21 October 1910 and transferred to Lorient on 13 May 1911 in preparation for her sea trials. Fourche was commissioned for her trials on 20 July and fully commissioned on 4 December 1911. The ship arrived at Toulon on 24 March 1912 and was assigned to the 1st Destroyer Flotilla (1^{ère} escadrille de torpilleurs) of the 1st Naval Army on 1 April.

When the First World War began in August 1914, Fourche was still assigned to the 1st Destroyer Flotilla of the 1st Naval Army. During the preliminary stages of the Battle of Antivari, Montenegro, on 16 August, the 1st, 4th and 5th Destroyer Flotillas were tasked to escort the core of the 1st Naval Army while the 2nd, 3rd and 6th Flotillas escorted the armored cruisers of the 2nd Light Squadron (2^{e} escadre légère) and two British cruisers. After reuniting both groups and spotting the Austro-Hungarian protected cruiser SMS Zenta and the destroyer SMS Ulan, the French destroyers played no role in sinking the cruiser, although the 4th Flotilla was sent on an unsuccessful pursuit of Ulan. Having broken the Austro-Hungarian blockade of Antivari (now known as Bar), Vice-Admiral (Vice-amiral) Augustin Boué de Lapeyrère, commander of the 1st Naval Army, decided to ferry troops and supplies to the port using a small requisitioned passenger ship, SS Liamone, escorted by the 2nd Light Squadron, reinforced by the armored cruiser Ernest Renan, and escorted by the destroyer Bouclier with the 1st and 6th Destroyer Flotillas under command while the rest of the 1st Naval Army bombarded the Austro-Hungarian naval base at Cattaro, Montenegro, on 1 September. Four days later, the fleet covered the evacuation of Danilo, Crown Prince of Montenegro, aboard Bouclier, to the Greek island of Corfu. The flotilla escorted multiple small convoys loaded with supplies and equipment to Antivari, beginning in October and lasting for the rest of the year, always covered by the larger ships of the Naval Army in futile attempts to lure the Austro-Hungarian fleet into battle. Amidst these missions, the 1st and 6th Flotillas were led by the French destroyer Dehorter as they conducted a sweep south of Cattaro on the night of 10/11 November in an unsuccessful search for Austro-Hungarian destroyers.

The torpedoing of the French battleship Jean Bart on 21 December caused a change in French tactics as the battleships were too important to risk to submarine attack. Henceforth, only the destroyers would escort the transports, covered by cruisers at a distance of 20–50 miles (32–80 km) from the transports. The first convoy of 1915 to Antivari arrived on 11 January and more were made until the last one on 20–21 April. After Italy signed the Treaty of London and declared war on the Austro-Hungarian Empire on 23 May, Boué de Lapeyrère reorganized his forces in late June to cover the approaches to the Adriatic and interdict merchant shipping of the Central Powers since the Royal Italian Navy (Regia Marina) now had primary responsibility for the Adriatic itself. His area of responsibility extended from Sardinia to Crete and he divided it into two zones with the 1st Light Squadron assigned to the western zone and the 2nd Light Squadron in the east. Those destroyers of the 1st Naval Army not assigned to reinforce the Italians were transferred to the newly formed 1st and 2nd Flotillas of the Naval Army (flotille d'Armée navale). The 1st and 3rd Destroyer Flotillas were assigned to the 2nd Flotilla of the Naval Army, of which ‘'Dehorter'’ was the flagship, which was tasked to support the cruisers of the 2nd Light Division.

The 1st Destroyer Flotilla was assigned to the 1st Division of Destroyers and Submarines (1^{ère} division de torpilleurs et de sous-marines) of the 2nd Squadron (escadre) based at Brindisi, Italy in December.

Fourche covered the evacuation of the Royal Serbian Army from Durazzo on 23–26 February 1916 and was unsuccessfully attacked by the Austro-Hungarian submarine SM U-16 on 24 April. The destroyer was part of the covering force for an attack on the Albanian port of Medova by two Italian MAS boats on the night of 15/16 June. The following week, the Austro-Hungarian submarine SM U-15 torpedoed the Italian auxiliary cruiser SS Città di Messina on 23 June, 20 nautical miles (37 km) east of Otranto, Italy, and then sank Fourche with a single torpedo as the destroyer attempted to rescue survivors from Città di Messina. Although the ship broke in half only 19 men were killed when she sank at coordinates 40°09′N 18°48′E.

== Bibliography ==
- Couhat, Jean Labayle (1974). French Warships of World War I. London: Ian Allan. ISBN 0-7110-0445-5.
- Freivogel, Zvonimir (2019). The Great War in the Adriatic Sea 1914–1918. Zagreb: Despot Infinitus. ISBN 978-953-8218-40-8.
- Jordan, John & Caresse, Philippe (2019). French Armoured Cruisers 1887–1932. Barnsley, UK: Seaforth Publishing. ISBN 978-1-5267-4118-9.
- Prévoteaux, Gérard (2017). La marine française dans la Grande guerre: les combattants oubliés: Tome I 1914–1915 [The French Navy during the Great War: The Forgotten Combatants, Book I 1914–1915]. Collection Navires & Histoire des Marines du Mond. Vol. 23. Le Vigen, France: Éditions Lela presse. ISBN 978-2-37468-000-2.
- Prévoteaux, Gérard (2017). La marine française dans la Grande guerre: les combattants oubliés: Tome II 1916–1918 [The French Navy during the Great War: The Forgotten Combatants, Book II 1916–1918]. Collection Navires & Histoire des Marines du Mond. Vol. 27. Le Vigen, France: Éditions Lela presse. ISBN 978-2-37468-001-9.
- Roberts, Stephen S. (2021). French Warships in the Age of Steam 1859–1914: Design, Construction, Careers and Fates. Barnsley, UK: Seaforth Publishing. ISBN 978-1-5267-4533-0.
