= SM U-16 (Austria-Hungary) =

Austro-Hungarian Navy's U-1-class submarine

History

Austria-Hungary
- Name: SM U-16
- Ordered: 1 April 1915
- Builder: AG Weser, Bremen
- Yard number: 233
- Laid down: April 1915
- Launched: 31 August 1915
- Completed: 30 September 1915
- Commissioned: 6 October 1915
- Fate: Sunk, 17 October 1916

Service record
- Commanders: Eugen Hornyák Edler von Horn; 6 October – 12 November 1915; Orest Ritter von Zopa; 18 November 1915 – 16 October 1916
- Victories: 1 merchant ship sunk (25 GRT); 1 warship sunk (330 tons); 1 merchant ship taken as prize (62 GRT)

General characteristics
- Type: U-10-class submarine
- Displacement: 127 tonnes (125 long tons) surfaced; 141 tonnes (139 long tons) submerged
- Length: 28.10 m (92 ft 2 in) (o/a); 23.62 m (77 ft 6 in) pressure hull
- Beam: 3.15 m (10 ft 4 in)
- Draught: 3.03 m (9 ft 11 in)
- Propulsion: 1 × shaft; 1 × Daimler diesel engine, 60 bhp (45 kW); 1 × electric motor, 120 shp (89 kW)
- Speed: 6.5 knots (12.0 km/h; 7.5 mph) surfaced; 5.5 knots (10.2 km/h; 6.3 mph) submerged
- Range: 1,500 nmi (2,800 km; 1,700 mi) at 5 kn (9.3 km/h; 5.8 mph) surfaced; 45 nmi (83 km; 52 mi) at 4 kn (7.4 km/h; 4.6 mph) submerged
- Test depth: 50 m (160 ft)
- Complement: 17
- Armament: 2 × 45 cm (17.7 in) torpedo tubes (both in front); 2 torpedoes

SM U-16 or U-XVI was a U-10-class submarine or U-boat of the Austro-Hungarian Navy (German: Kaiserliche und Königliche Kriegsmarine or K.u. K. Kriegsmarine) during World War I. U-16 was constructed in Germany and shipped by rail to Pola where she was assembled and completed in September 1915. She was commissioned in October 1915.

For most of her career, U-16 operated in the Adriatic out of Kotor patrolling off the Albanian coast. The U-boat sank one small sailing ship in November and seized another in December. U-16 carried Field Marshal Svetozar Borojević of the Austro-Hungarian Army as an observer while performing diving tests after engine repairs in January 1916. A water leak in March flooded U-16's batteries and put the U-boat out of action for about six weeks of repairs. While operating off Vlorë in mid-October 1916, U-16 sank an Italian destroyer acting as a convoy escort. U-16 was sunk in the ensuing action, but sources are not clear on the exact cause of her sinking. In all U-16 sank or captured three ships with a combined tonnage of 417. She was the only U-10-class submarine sunk during the war.

== Design and construction ==
U-16 was a small, coastal submarine that displaced 125.5 long tons (127.5 t) surfaced and 140.25 long tons (142.50 t) submerged. She featured a single shaft, a single 60 bhp (45 kW) Daimler diesel engine for surface running, and a single 120 shp (89 kW) electric motor for submerged travel. U-16 was capable of up to 6.5 knots (12.0 km/h; 7.5 mph) while surfaced and 5.5 knots (10.2 km/h; 6.3 mph) while submerged at a diving depth of up to 50 metres (160 ft). She was designed for a crew of 17 officers and men.

U-16 was equipped with two 45 cm (17.7 in) torpedo tubes located in the front and carried a complement of two torpedoes. Although most members of the class were outfitted with a 37 mm/23 (1.5 in) quick-firing (QF) gun to supplement their armament in October 1916, it is not known whether this upgrade had yet taken place on U-16 by the time of her sinking during that month.

U-16 was ordered by the Austro-Hungarian Navy on 1 April 1915 and laid down at AG Weser in Bremen on later in the month. When completed, the submarine was broken down into sections, loaded onto railcars, and shipped on 20 August to the Austro-Hungarian Navy's main base at Pola. After completing the eight-day journey, the sections were riveted together. Though there is no specific mention of how long it took for U-16's sections to be assembled, a sister boat, the German Type UB I submarine UB-3, shipped to Pula from Germany in mid-April 1915, was assembled in about two weeks. (Note: The Austro-Hungarian U-10 class and the German Type UB I were virtually identical.) U-16 was delivered to the Austro-Hungarian Navy on 29 September.

== Operational history ==
SM U-16 was commissioned into the Austro-Hungarian Navy on 6 October under the command of Linienschiffsleutnant Eugen Hornyák Edler von Horn. (Note: Two of U-16's sister ships, SM U-15 and SM U-17, were commissioned the same day.) Over the next month U-16 patrolled off Rimini and the Po estuary before heading to Kotor. There, U-16's second commander, Linienschiffsleutnant Orest Ritter von Zopa, assumed command on 18 November. The U-boat departed the next day to patrol off Albania. Near Cape Rodoni, Zopa stopped and boarded Fiore Albania, an Albanian sailing ship. Finding nothing amiss, the commander sent Fiore Albania on her way. Three days later, Zopa and U-16 scored their first success, when they sank the 25 GRT Italian sailing vessel Unione in the Gulf of Drin. Later the same day, a torpedo attack on two cargo ships in the harbor at Shëngjin netted no results. With her supply of torpedoes expended, U-16 returned to Kotor on 24 November.

U-16 set out on her next patrol on 3 December, but had to return to fix a broken gyrocompass, and was underway for Albania the next day. On 5 December, the sailboat Xephanie was stopped, searched, and allowed to proceed. Near the same location, U-16 next encountered Fione Albania again. When stopped this time, the 62 GRT ship had Montenegrin soldiers, weapons, and ammunition aboard. The vessel was seized as a prize and taken back to Kotor. (Note: The date is reported as either 5 or 7 December.) U-16 attempted two more Albanian patrols at the end of December. The first, departing Kotor on 19 December, was cut short by severe weather that forced the submarine back to port. The next attempt, on 25 December, ended when U-16 suffered engine problems. U-16 sailed for Pula on 27 December for more extensive engine repairs at the naval base there.

U-16's repairs were complete by 9 January 1916 when the submarine departed Pula for diving tests with Field Marshal Svetozar Borojević of the Austro-Hungarian Army on board as an observer. With the tests apparently successful, U-16 returned to Kotor on 18 January to resume Albanian patrols. Off Durrës on 4 February, Zopa and U-16 launched a torpedo attack on the steamer Assyria being escorted by the Italian destroyers Animoso and Garibaldino. The torpedo's aim was true, but it failed to detonate when it hit the ship. A few days later, a British Falmouth-class cruiser attacked the U-boat. On 11 March, a valve on U-16 leaked and water flooded into the boat, inundating the batteries, which released chlorine gas. The U-boat made it back to Kotor and underwent repairs that kept the boat out of action until the end of April.

From late April to early September, U-16 patrolled the Adriatic between Vlorë, Brindisi, and the Straits of Otranto. Twice during this time U-16 attacked French destroyers, but missed on both attempts. In mid June, Zopa launched torpedoes against a cargo ship without result. U-16 put in at Kotor on 3 September for a general overhaul that lasted for about a month.

== Fate ==
On 9 October 1916, when the repairs were complete, U-16 set out for another Albanian patrol. The submarine made a detour to Djenovic on 11 October to replace another faulty gyrocompass, but quickly resumed her journey to the Vlorë area. After discovering an Italian convoy on 17 October, Zopa torpedoed and sank one of the convoy escorts, the Nembo. In the ensuing action, U-16 was sunk, but sources disagree on the exact manner. Conway's All the World's Fighting Ships 1906–1921 reports that the Italian steamer Bormida, one of the convoyed ships, rammed and damaged U-16, causing U-16's crew to scuttle their ship due to the severity of the damage. (Note: Conway's (p. 343) reports the name of the ship as "Borminda", which does not show up in ship registries. Rodger Haworth reports an Italian cargo ship by the name of "Bormida" active from 1884 to 1928, which agrees with one of the names given by Gordon Smith. For Haworth, see: "Bormida (5615289)". Miramar Ship Index. For Smith, see: Smith, Gordon (15 September 2008). "Austro-Hungarian Navy: Submarines". World War 1 at Sea.) Uboat.net's U-Boat War in World War I reports that Nembo herself rammed U-16 before going down, while Robert Grant and Gordon Smith give another possible fate for U-16: that Nembo's depth charges detonated and sank the submarine while Nembo was sinking. Smith reports that 11 men aboard U-16, including her commanding officer Zopa, lost their lives in the sinking, and that two survivors were picked up. U-16 was the only boat of her class to be sunk during the war.

== Exploration of the wreck site ==
In 2015 the Albanian-American team comprising the RPM Nautical Foundation and The Albanian Center for Marine Research located a wreck south-west of Karaburun Peninsula in Vlorë County, Albania. Operation with an ROV brought images from the suspected wreck. Photographs and footage taken from this particular wreck were examined by marine experts and are thought to be of a possible First World War U-Boat. Albanian Historian and Director of ACMR Auron Tare gave a presentation in September 2015 at the Albanian Academy of Science exploring the possibility that maybe this unidentifying wreck might be SM U-16. Given the proximity of the Italian reports on the place that the SM U-16 was sunk and this discovery, the team might have located the Austro-Hungarian submarine SM U-16.

== Summary of raiding history ==
Ships sunk or damaged by SM U-16
Date	Name	Nationality	Tonnage (Note: Merchant ship tonnages are in gross register tons. Military vessels are listed by tons displacement)	Fate
23 November 1915	Unione	Italy	25	Sunk
7 December 1915	Fiore Albania	Albania	62	Captured as prize
16 October 1916	Nembo	Regia Marina	330	Sunk
		Total:	417	

== Bibliography ==
- Bendert, Harald (2000). Die UB-Boote der Kaiserlichen Marine, 1914-1918. Einsätze, Erfolge, Schicksal (in German). Hamburg: Verlag E.S. Mittler & Sohn GmbH. ISBN 3-8132-0713-7.
- Gröner, Erich; Jung, Dieter; Maass, Martin (1991). U-boats and Mine Warfare Vessels. German Warships 1815–1945. Vol. 2. Translated by Thomas, Keith; Magowan, Rachel. London: Conway Maritime Press. ISBN 0-85177-593-4.
- Baumgartner, Lothar; Erwin Sieche (1999). Die Schiffe der k.(u.)k. Kriegsmarine im Bild = Austro-Hungarian warships in photographs (in German). Wien: Verlagsbuchhandlung Stöhr. ISBN 978-3-901208-25-6. OCLC 43596931.
- Gardiner, Robert; Gray, Randal, eds. (1985). Conway's All the World's Fighting Ships 1906–1921. Annapolis, Maryland: Naval Institute Press. ISBN 978-0-87021-907-8. OCLC 12119866.
- Grant, Robert M. (2002) [1964]. U-boats Destroyed: The Effect of Anti-submarine Warfare, 1914–1918. Penzance: Periscope. ISBN 978-1-904381-00-6. OCLC 50215640.
- Messimer, Dwight R. (2002). Verschollen: World War I U-boat Losses. Annapolis, Maryland: Naval Institute Press. ISBN 978-1-55750-475-3. OCLC 231973419.
