= Zdenko Hudeček =

Austro-Hungarian U-boat commander

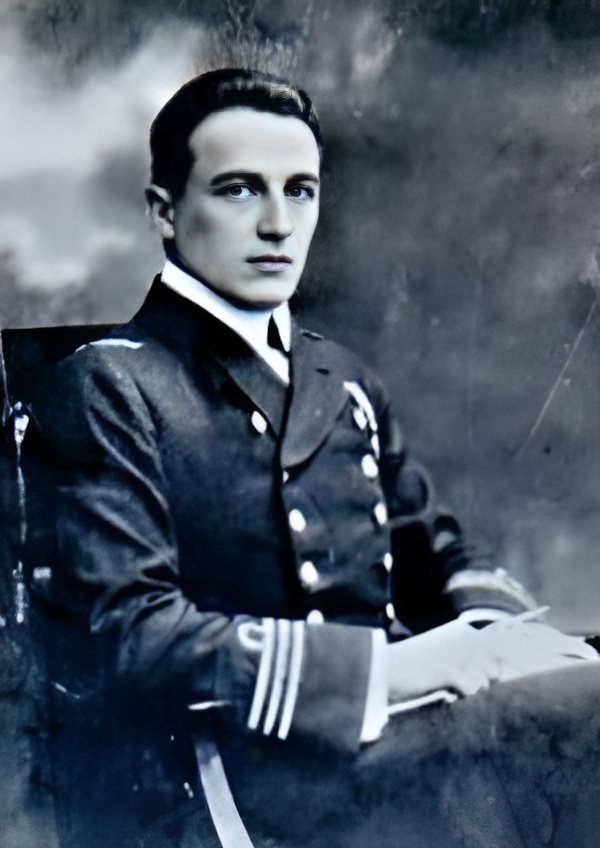
- Zdenko Hudeček in c. 1913
- Born: 22 June 1887; Terezín, Bohemia, Austria-Hungary
- Died: 28 September 1974 (aged 87); Jablunkov, Czechoslovakia
- Military career
- Allegiance: Austria-Hungary
- Branch: Austro-Hungarian Navy; Kriegsmarine
- Service years: 1901–1918
- Rank: Korvettenkapitän (lieutenant-commander)
- Commands: SM U-2 (21 September 1914 – 31 July 1914); SM U-17 (9 December 1915 – 26 June 1916); SM U-28 (26 June 1916 – 31 October 1918)
- Conflicts: World War I

Zdenko Hudeček (22 June 1887 – 28 September 1974) was a Czech-Austrian officer in the Austro-Hungarian Navy. He was one of the most successful Austro-Hungarian submarine commanders of World War I, sinking 11 Allied merchant ships and two Allied warships displacing 44,743 GRT. After the war he joined and shortly served in the Czechoslovak Naval Forces.

== Early life ==
Zdenko Hudeček was born in the fort town of Theresienstadt (Terezín), Bohemia, Austria-Hungary (present-day Czech Republic) to a family of an army clerk. His father died when Zdenko was five years old. He attended a German-language primary school and later the gymnasium in Znojmo, being finally accepted at the Imperial and Royal Naval Academy in Fiume (present-day Rijeka).

== Naval career ==
Beginning in 1910 he served as a deputy officer on various Austro-Hungarian vessels: battleships SMS Tegetthoff and SMS Erzherzog Karl, the light cruiser SMS Zenta, then the battleship SMS Kaiserin Elisabeth, the torpedo destroyer Tb.12 or the destroyer Alligator. In 1913 he attended a submarine course at Pula naval base which he finished in 1914 and then was appointed as the commander of the submarine U-2. After the outbreak of the First World War, Hudeček led U-2 to the operations along the Danube River beginning on 1 January 1915. In the middle of the year, Hudeček was wounded and recuperated in Pola until August. On 9 December, he became the commander of the submarine U-17.

On 10 July 1916, U-17 torpedoed and sank the 680-ton Italian destroyer Impetuoso. In March, May, June and August 1917 Hudeček sank three steamers, as well as one Q-ship (a destroyer disguised as a merchant ship) in August. From 26 June 1916 until the end of war, he became the commander of U-28 sinking three steamers in January 1918 and two more in March.

== Czechoslovakia ==
After the dissolution of Austro-Hungary he returned to his homeland and became a citizen of the new Czechoslovak state. In December 1918, he enlisted in the Czechoslovak Naval Forces, where he held several positions until its dissolving in 1921. In 1922 Hudeček retired from the navy service completely and then worked as a cargo ship captain at the Czechoslovak Danube Company.

He died on 28 September 1974 in Jablunkov at the age of 87.

== Accusations ==
After the war, the Kingdom of Italy labeled Zdenko Hudeček as a war criminal and requested his extradition for the insidious sinking of the Italian liner Bosphorus. Hudeček defended himself that the steamer was armed and it was sunk in a proper fight and also the Czechoslovak state refused to extradite him to Italy. Czech divers who explored and documented the shipwreck in the early 2000s then proved that the ship was indeed armed.
