= Italian destroyer Impetuoso (1913) =

Italian destroyer of World War I

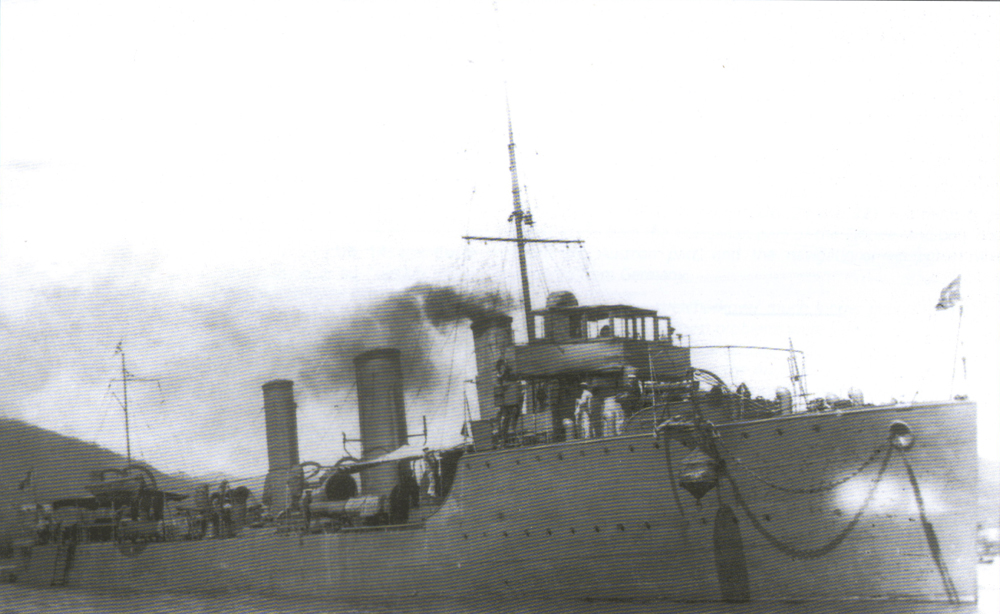
- Impetuoso in 1916.

History

Kingdom of Italy
- Name: Impetuoso
- Namesake: "Impetuoso"
- Builder: Cantiere Pattison, Naples, Kingdom of Italy
- Laid down: 1910
- Launched: 23 July 1913
- Commissioned: 1914
- Fate: Sunk 10 July 1916

General characteristics
- Type: Destroyer
- Displacement: 672–770 metric tons (741–849 short tons)
- Length: 237 ft 11 in (72.52 m) (wl); 239 ft 6 in (73.00 m) (oa)
- Beam: 24 ft (7.3 m)
- Draft: 7 ft 11 in (2.41 m)
- Propulsion: 2 shafts; 2 × Tosi steam turbines; 4 × Thornycroft boilers; 16,000 hp (11,931 kW) designed/17,620 shp (13,139 kW) maximum
- Speed: 30 knots (56 km/h; 35 mph) designed; 35.79 knots (66.28 km/h; 41.19 mph) maximum
- Endurance: 1,200 nmi (2,200 km; 1,400 mi) at 14 knots (26 km/h; 16 mph); 500 nmi (930 km; 580 mi) at 25 knots (46 km/h; 29 mph); 350 nmi (650 km; 400 mi) at 30 knots (56 km/h; 35 mph)
- Complement: 4–5 officers, 65–74 enlisted men
- Armament: As built: 1 × 4.7 in (120 mm) gun 4 × 3 in (76.2 mm) guns 2 × 17.7 in (450 mm) torpedo tubes

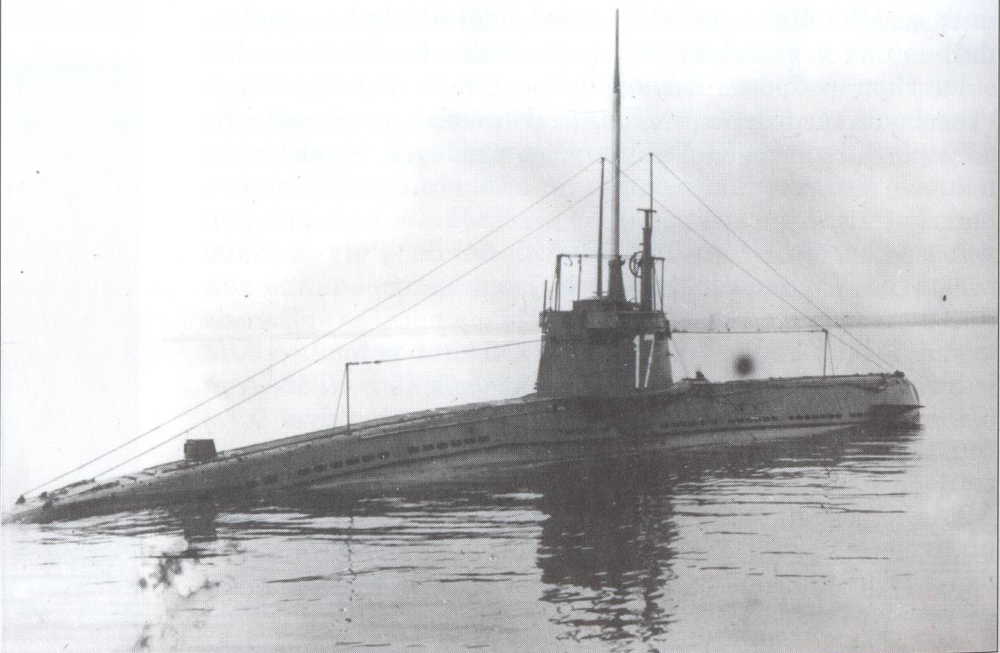
The Austro-Hungarian Navy submarine U-17 in 1916. She sank Impetuoso on 10 July 1916.

Impetuoso (English: "Impetuous") was an Italian Indomito-class destroyer. Commissioned into service in the Italian Regia Marina (Royal Navy) in 1914, she served in World War I, playing an active role in the Adriatic campaign until she was sunk in 1916 by the Austro-Hungarian submarine SM U-17 with the loss of 37 men.

== Construction and commissioning ==
Impetuoso was laid down at the Cantiere Pattison (English: Pattison Shipyard) in Naples, Italy, in 1910. She was launched on 23 July 1913 and commissioned in 1914.

== Service history ==
=== World War I ===
==== 1915 ====
World War I broke out in 1914, and the Kingdom of Italy entered the war on the side of the Allies with its declaration of war on Austria-Hungary on 23 May 1915. At the time, Impetuoso, under the command of Capitano di corvetta (Corvette Captain) Giuseppe Sirianni, and the destroyers Impavido, Indomito, Insidioso, Intrepido, and Irrequieto made up the 2nd Destroyer Squadron. The squadron, under the command of Capitano de fregata (Frigate Captain) P. Orsini, was based at Taranto, although either Impetuoso or Indomito or both were visiting La Spezia that day. On 9 June 1915, Impetuoso, Indomito, Insidioso, Intrepido, Irrequieto, the protected cruiser Quarto, and the destroyers Animoso, Ardente, Ardito, and Audace escorted the armored cruisers Giuseppe Garibaldi and Vettor Pisani as they participated in the bombardment of the lighthouses at the Cape of Rodon and Shëngjin (known to the Italians as San Giovanni di Medua) on the coast of the Principality of Albania.

On 3 December 1915 Impetuoso , Indomito, Insidioso, Intrepido, and Irrequieto got underway from Brindisi to escort one of the first supply convoys for Italian troops in Albania. As the convoy — composed of the troop transports Re Umberto and Valparaiso, carrying a total of 1,800 men and 150 draft animals — approached Shëngjin (known to the Italians as San Giovanni di Medua) on the coast of Albania, Re Umberto, with 765 men on board, hit a mine laid by the Imperial German Navy submarine UC-14, broke in two, and sank in 15 minutes. Rescuers saved 712 men.

On 8 December 1915, Impetuoso and Insidioso escorted the steamship Palermo, carrying over 700 men and 43 draft animals, from Taranto to Vlorë (known to the Italians as Valona) in Albania. On the night of 11–12 December 1915 Impetuoso, still under Sirianni's command, and Insidioso escorted Valparaiso, loaded with troops, from Taranto to Vlorë.

==== 1916 ====
On 23 February 1916 Impetuoso and Insidioso bombarded Austro-Hungarian artillery positions on the mountain Sasso Bianco in the Dolomites during the evacuation of Durrës (known to the Italians as Durazzo) in Albania. The same day, Impetuoso, Indomito, the protected cruisers Libia and Puglia, and the destroyer Ardito positioned themselves in the harbor at Durrës to protect the withdrawal of the "Savona" Brigade. Some sources claim that Impetuoso sank a Central Powers submarine sometime in the next few days, although there was no confirmation of the sinking.

On 9 July 1916 Impetuoso (now under the command of an officer named Ponza di San Martino) and Irrequieto set out in pursuit of the Austro-Hungarian scout cruiser Novara, which had attacked the Otranto Barrage in the Strait of Otranto and sunk the naval drifters — armed fishing boats that patrolled anti-submarine barriers — Astrum, Claivis, and Spei, but Novara reached the Austro-Hungarian naval base at Cattaro before they could intercept her.

At 15:30 on 10 July 1916 Impetuoso and Insidioso were patrolling the barrage when the Austro-Hungarian submarine U-17 attacked them. Impetuoso′s crew sighted the wake of U-17′s torpedo at a range of only 150 metres (160 yd), too late for her to take evasive action. The torpedo hit Impetuoso and she sank suddenly in position 40°10′N 018°50′E with the loss of 37 lives. Fifty-one men were rescued.
