= SM U-15 (Austria-Hungary) =

Austro-Hungarian Navy's U-10-class submarine

History

Austria-Hungary
- Name: SM U-15
- Builder: AG Weser, Bremen
- Yard number: 232
- Launched: September 1915
- Commissioned: 6 October 1915
- Fate: Handed over to Italy as war reparations and scrapped, 1920

Service record
- Commanders: Friedrich Schlosser; 6 October – 18 November 1915; Friedrich Fähndrich; 28 November 1915 – 25 March 1916; Franz Rzemenowsky von Trautenegg; 25 March – 10 May 1916; Friedrich Fähndrich; 10 May – 11 December 1916; Franz Rzemenowsky von Trautenegg; 9 – 28 October 1916; Otto Molitor; 11 December 1916 – 15 June 1917; Franz Rzemenowsky von Trautenegg; 1 – 12 June 1917; Otto Molitor; 12 June – 17 July 1917; Ludwig Müller; 17 July 1917 – 9 March 1918; Andreas Korparic; 17 March – 31 October 1918
- Victories: 5 merchant ships sunk (8,044 GRT); 1 warship sunk (745 tons)

General characteristics
- Type: U-10-class submarine
- Displacement: 125.5 long tons (127.51 t) surfaced; 140.25 long tons (142.50 t) submerged
- Length: 28.10 m (92 ft 2 in) (o/a); 23.62 m (77 ft 6 in) pressure hull
- Beam: 3.15 m (10 ft 4 in)
- Draught: 3.03 m (9 ft 11 in)
- Propulsion: 1 × shaft; 1 × Daimler diesel engine, 59 bhp (44 kW); 1 × electric motor, 119 shp (89 kW)
- Speed: 6.5 knots (12.0 km/h; 7.5 mph) surfaced; 5.5 knots (10.2 km/h; 6.3 mph) submerged
- Range: 1,500 nmi (2,800 km; 1,700 mi) at 5 knots (9.3 km/h; 5.8 mph) surfaced; 45 nmi (83 km; 52 mi) at 4 knots (7.4 km/h; 4.6 mph) submerged
- Complement: 17
- Armament: 2 × 45 cm (17.7 in) torpedo tubes (both in front); 2 torpedoes; 1 × 37 mm/23 (1.5 in) QF gun, October 1916; 1 × 47 mm (1.9 in)/33 QF gun, November 1917

SM U-15 or U-XV was a U-10-class submarine or U-boat of the Austro-Hungarian Navy (German: Kaiserliche und Königliche Kriegsmarine or K.u.K. Kriegsmarine) during World War I. U-15 was constructed in Germany and shipped by rail to Pola where she was assembled and launched in April 1915. She was commissioned in October 1915. U-15 was the most successful boat of the U-10 class, sinking six ships totaling 8,044 gross register tons (GRT) and 745 tons. The boat survived the war and was handed over to Italy as a war reparation and scrapped in 1920.

== Design and construction ==
U-15 was constructed at AG Weser in Bremen for the Austro-Hungarian Navy and then shipped by rail in sections to the navy yard at Pola, where the sections were riveted together. Though there is no specific mention of how long it took for U-15's sections to be assembled, a sister boat, the German Type UB I submarine UB-3, shipped to Pola from Germany in mid-April 1915, was assembled in about two weeks. (Note: The Austro-Hungarian U-10 class and the German Type UB I were virtually identical.) U-15 was launched in April.

U-15 was a small, coastal submarine that displaced 125.5 long tons (127.5 t) surfaced and 140.25 long tons (142.50 t) submerged. She featured a single shaft, a single 59 bhp (44 kW) Daimler diesel engine for surface running, and a single 119 shp (89 kW) electric motor for submerged travel. U-15 was capable of up to 6.5 knots (12.0 km/h; 7.5 mph) while surfaced and 5.5 knots (10.2 km/h; 6.3 mph) while submerged at a diving depth of up to 50 metres (160 ft). She was designed for a crew of 17 officers and men.

U-15 was equipped with two 45 cm (17.7 in) torpedo tubes located in the front and carried a complement of two torpedoes. In October 1916, U-15's armament was supplemented with a 37 mm/23 (1.5 in) quick-firing (QF) gun. This gun was replaced by a 47 mm (1.9 in)/33 QF gun in November 1917.

== Operational history ==
SM U-15 was commissioned into the Austro-Hungarian Navy on 6 October under the command of Linienschiffsleutnant Friedrich Schlosser. On 28 November, Linienschiffsleutnant Friedrich Fähndrich was assigned to the first of two stints in command of the boat. On 18 December, Fähndrich and U-15 attacked and sank two Albanian sailing vessels near Lezhë. The Erzen, of 25 GRT, and the Figlio Preligiona, of 80 GRT, were both sunk at position 41°47′N 19°31′E. After being relieved by Linienschiffsleutnant Franz Rzemenowsky von Trautenegg from late March to early May 1916, Fähndrich resumed command on 10 May. One week later, on 17 May, U-15 torpedoed and sank the 2,237 GRT Italian steamer Stura in the Adriatic some 18 nautical miles (33 km) east of Brindisi. (Note: Stura, launched in 1883, had sailed in passenger duty for Navigazione Generale Italiana between the Mediterranean and New York before the war. See: Immigration Information Bureau, pp. 8–9, 16, 23.)

The following month, Fähndrich and the crew of U-15 scored their second double kill when they sank the Italian auxiliary cruiser Cittá di Messina (3,495 GRT) and the French destroyer Fourche (745 tons). While about 20 nautical miles (37 km) east of Otranto on 23 June, U-15 torpedoed and sank Cittá di Messina. The escorting destroyer Fourche began a depth charge attack on U-15 and assumed success when an oil slick appeared on the surface. After the captain of Fourche turned his attentions to the rescue Cittá di Messina's survivors, U-15 launched a single torpedo that struck Fourche amidships and sank her.

On 25 October, U-15, back under the command of von Trautenegg, sank the 2,207 GRT Italian steamer Polcevera, a sister ship to Stura (sunk by U-15 in May). Polcevera was the last ship sunk by U-15.

From October 1916 to the end of the fighting in November 1918, U-15's activities are unknown. U-15 was at Pola at the end of the war when Austria-Hungary handed her over to Italy. U-15 was scrapped at Pola by 1920.

== Summary of raiding history ==
Date	Name	Nationality	Tonnage (Note: Merchant ship tonnages are in gross register tons. Military vessels are listed by tons displacement.)	Fate
18 December 1915	Erzen	Albania	25	Sunk
18 December 1915	Figlio Preligiona	Albania	80	Sunk
17 May 1916	Stura	Kingdom of Italy	2,237	Sunk
23 June 1916	Citta Di Messina	Kingdom of Italy	3,495	Sunk
23 June 1916	Fourche	French Navy	745	Sunk
25 October 1916	Polceverra	Kingdom of Italy	2,207	Sunk
		Total:	8,789	

== Bibliography ==
- Bendert, Harald (2000). Die UB-Boote der Kaiserlichen Marine, 1914-1918. Einsätze, Erfolge, Schicksal (in German). Hamburg: Verlag E.S. Mittler & Sohn GmbH. ISBN 3-8132-0713-7.
- Gröner, Erich; Jung, Dieter; Maass, Martin (1991). U-boats and Mine Warfare Vessels. German Warships 1815–1945. Vol. 2. Translated by Thomas, Keith; Magowan, Rachel. London: Conway Maritime Press. ISBN 0-85177-593-4.
- Baumgartner, Lothar; Erwin Sieche (1999). Die Schiffe der k.(u.)k. Kriegsmarine im Bild = Austro-Hungarian warships in photographs (in German). Wien: Verlagsbuchhandlung Stöhr. ISBN 978-3-901208-25-6. OCLC 43596931.
- Compton-Hall, Richard (2004) [1991]. Submarines at War, 1914–18. Penzance: Periscope Publishing. ISBN 978-1-904381-21-1. OCLC 57639764.
- Gardiner, Robert, ed. (1985). Conway's All the World's Fighting Ships 1906–1921. Annapolis, Maryland: Naval Institute Press. ISBN 978-0-87021-907-8. OCLC 12119866.
- Gibson, R. H.; Prendergast, Maurice (2003) [1931]. The German Submarine War, 1914–1918. Annapolis, Maryland: Naval Institute Press. ISBN 978-1-59114-314-7. OCLC 52924732.
- Immigration Information Bureau (1987) [1931]. Morton Allan directory of European passenger steamship arrivals for the years 1890 to 1930 at the Port of New York and for the years 1904 to 1926 at the ports of New York, Philadelphia, Boston, and Baltimore. Baltimore: Genealogical Publishing Company. ISBN 978-0-8063-0830-2. OCLC 16464579.
- Messimer, Dwight R. (2002). Verschollen: World War I U-boat Losses. Annapolis, Maryland: Naval Institute Press. ISBN 978-1-55750-475-3. OCLC 231973419.
