= SM U-10 (Austria-Hungary) =

Austro-Hungarian lead boat of U-10 class

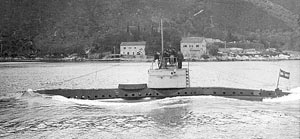
- SM U-10

History

German Empire
- Name: UB-1
- Builder: Germaniawerft, Kiel
- Yard number: 239
- Laid down: 1 November 1914
- Launched: 22 January 1915
- Commissioned: 29 January 1915
- Fate: Transferred to Austria-Hungary, 4 June 1915

Service record as UB-1
- Commanders: Oblt. Franz Wäger; 29 January – 9 July 1915
- Victories: 1 warship sunk (120 tons)

Austria-Hungary
- Name: SM U-10
- Acquired: 4 June 1915
- Fate: Handed over as war reparations and scrapped, 1920

Service record as U-10
- Commanders: Karl Edler von Unczowski; 4 July – 10 September 1915; Leo Prásil; 16 September 1915 – 22 August 1916; Otto Molitor; 22 August – 10 December 1916; Hermann Rigele; 10 December 1916 – 11 June 1917; Albrecht Graf von Attems; 15 June – 26 July 1917; Robert Dürrigl; 26 July – 24 November 1917; Andreas Korparic; 25 November 1917 – 17 March 1918; Friedrich Sterz; 23 – 26 May 1918; Johann Ulmansky von Vracsevgaj; 26 May – 31 August 1918
- Victories: None

General characteristics
- Class & type: As built: Type UB I submarine; After June 1915: U-10-class submarine
- Displacement: 127 tonnes (125 long tons) surfaced; 142 tonnes (140 long tons) submerged
- Length: 28.10 m (92 ft 2 in) (o/a); 23.62 m (77 ft 6 in) pressure hull
- Beam: 3.15 m (10 ft 4 in)
- Draught: 3.03 m (9 ft 11 in)
- Propulsion: 1 × shaft; 1 × Daimler diesel engine, 60 bhp (45 kW); 1 × electric motor, 120 shp (89 kW)
- Speed: 6.5 knots (12.0 km/h; 7.5 mph) surfaced; 5.5 knots (10.2 km/h; 6.3 mph) submerged
- Range: 1,650 nautical miles (3,060 km; 1,900 mi) at 5 knots (9.3 km/h; 5.8 mph) surfaced; 45 nautical miles (83 km; 52 mi) at 4 knots (7.4 km/h; 4.6 mph) submerged
- Complement: 17
- Armament: 2 × 45 cm (17.7 in) torpedo tubes (both in front); 2 torpedoes; 1 × 37 mm (1.5 in)/23 QF gun, October 1916; 1 × 47 mm (1.9 in)/33 QF gun, November 1917

SM U-10 or U-X was the lead boat of the U-10 class of submarines for the Austro-Hungarian Navy (German: Kaiserliche und Königliche Kriegsmarine or K.u.K. Kriegsmarine) during World War I. She was originally a German Type UB I submarine commissioned into the German Imperial Navy (German: Kaiserliche Marine) as SM UB-1.

SM UB-1 was constructed in Germany and shipped by rail to Pola where she was assembled and launched in January 1915. She was commissioned into the German Imperial Navy later that same month and sank an Italian torpedo boat in June. The boat was handed over to Austria-Hungary and commissioned as SM U-10 in July. In May 1917, U-10 was fired upon by a British submarine, but both of the torpedoes that were launched missed. In July 1918, U-10 hit a mine and was beached with heavy damage. She was towed to Trieste for repairs which remained unfinished at the war's end. U-10 was handed over to Italy as a war reparation and scrapped in 1920.

== Design and construction ==
U-10 was a small, coastal submarine that displaced 127 tonnes (125 long tons) surfaced and 142 tonnes (140 long tons) submerged. She featured a single shaft, a single 60 bhp (45 kW) Daimler diesel engine for surface running, and a single 120 shp (89 kW) electric motor for submerged travel. U-10 was capable of up to 6.5 knots (12.0 km/h; 7.5 mph) while surfaced and 5.5 knots (10.2 km/h; 6.3 mph) while submerged at a diving depth of up to 50 metres (160 ft). She was designed for a crew of 17 officers and men.

U-10 was equipped with two 45 cm (17.7 in) torpedo tubes located in the front and carried a complement of two torpedoes. German Type UB I submarines were additionally equipped with a 8 mm (0.31 in) machine gun, but it is not clear from sources if U-10, as a former German boat, was either equipped with one or, if so, retained it in Austro-Hungarian service. In October 1916, U-10's armament was supplemented with a 37 mm (1.5 in)/23 quick-firing (QF) gun. This gun was replaced by a 47 mm (1.9 in)/33 QF gun in November 1917.

Construction of UB-1 was started on 1 November 1914 at Germaniawerft in Kiel. After her assembly was complete UB-1 was launched on 22 January 1915.

After extended negotiations between Austria-Hungary and Germany, in March 1915 it was decided for Germany to supply five submarines of the UB I type. This model was familiar to the Austro-Hungarian Navy since the Imperial German Navy had reassembled UB3, UB 8, and UB 9 at the Pola Navy Yard. The first boat was bought on 4 April 1915, a "sample" UB 1 boat. This submarine was shipped by rail in sections to Pola, where the sections were riveted together. Though there is no record of how long it took for UB-1's parts to be assembled, a sister boat, UB-3, shipped from Germany in mid-April 1915, was assembled in about two weeks.

== Operational history ==
SM UB-1 was commissioned into the German Imperial Navy under the command of Oberleutnant zur See Franz Wäger on 29 January. An Austro-Hungarian Navy officer was assigned to the boat for piloting and training purposes. On 26 June 1915, UB-1 sank the Italian torpedo boat 5 PN in the Gulf of Venice.

On 4 June 1915, after being disassembled into three sections and transported by rail to Pola for reassembling, UB-1 was handed over to the Austro-Hungarian Navy and commissioned as U-10 under the command of Linienschiffsleutnant Karl Edler von Unczowski.

The British submarine H4 had an encounter with U-10 on 11 May 1917. While cruising off Pola, H4 came across U-10 and fired a spread of two torpedoes at the submarine. The torpedoes were aimed to be 5° apart at a distance of 365 metres (400 yd) which was apparently too wide, because the captain of H4 observed the torpedoes miss just ahead and just astern of U-10.

On 9 July 1918, U-10 hit an Italian mine near Caorle in the northern Adriatic Sea at position 45°30′N 13°00′E, and was beached with heavy damage. Although she was looted by Austro-Hungarian Army troops, she was later towed to Trieste for repairs, which remained unfinished at war's end; all of the 13 crew personnel were saved. U-10 was handed over to Italy as a war reparation and scrapped at Pola by 1920. U-10 sank no ships in her Austro-Hungarian service.

== Summary of raiding history ==
Date	Name	Nationality	Tonnage	Fate
26 June 1915	5 PN	Regia Marina	120	Sunk

== Bibliography ==
- Bendert, Harald (2000). Die UB-Boote der Kaiserlichen Marine, 1914-1918. Einsätze, Erfolge, Schicksal (in German). Hamburg: Verlag E.S. Mittler & Sohn GmbH. ISBN 3-8132-0713-7.
- Gröner, Erich; Jung, Dieter; Maass, Martin (1991). U-boats and Mine Warfare Vessels. German Warships 1815–1945. Vol. 2. Translated by Thomas, Keith; Magowan, Rachel. London: Conway Maritime Press. ISBN 0-85177-593-4.
- Compton-Hall, Richard (2004) [1991]. Submarines at war, 1914–18. Penzance: Periscope Publishing. ISBN 978-1-904381-21-1. OCLC 57639764.
- Gardiner, Robert; Gray, Randal, eds. (1985). Conway's All the World's Fighting Ships 1906–1921. Annapolis, Maryland: Naval Institute Press. ISBN 978-0-87021-907-8. OCLC 12119866.
- Messimer, Dwight R. (2002). Verschollen : World War I U-boat losses. Annapolis, Maryland: Naval Institute Press. ISBN 978-1-55750-475-3. OCLC 231973419.
- Rössler, Eberhard (1985). Die deutschen U-Boote und ihre Werften: U-Bootbau bis Ende des 1. Weltkriegs, Konstruktionen für das Ausland und die Jahre 1935–1945 [The German Submarines and Their Shipyards: Submarine Construction Until the End of the First World War] (in German). Vol. I. Koblenz: Bernard & Graefe. ISBN 3-7637-5213-7.
