= SM U-11 (Austria-Hungary) =

Austro-Hungarian U-10-class submarine

- SM U-11

History

German Empire
- Name: UB-15
- Ordered: 15 October 1914
- Builder: AG Weser, Bremen
- Yard number: 224
- Laid down: 9 November 1914
- Commissioned: 11 April 1915
- Fate: Transferred to Austria-Hungary, 14 June 1915 (Note: Sources differ as to exactly when the U-boat was transferred over to the Austro-Hungarian navy. See Stern, p. 193.)

Service record as UB-15
- Commanders: Oblt. Heino von Heimburg; 4 – 17 June 1915
- Victories: 1 warship sunk (245 tons)

Austria-Hungary
- Name: SM U-11
- Acquired: 14 June 1915
- Commissioned: 18 June 1915
- Fate: War reparation to Italy; scrapped at Pola, 1920

Service record as U-11
- Commanders: Lüdwig Eberhardt; 8 June – 31 August 1915; Karl Edler von Unczowski; 16 September – 28 October 1915; Robert Teufl von Fernland; 28 October 1915 – 30 August 1916; Johann Krsnjavi; 30 August 1916 – 25 May 1917; Ludwig Müller; 25 May – 16 July 1917; Wladimir Pfeifer; 16 July – 17 September 1917; Eugen Hornyák Edler von Horn; 17 September 1917 – 12 January 1918; Hugo Pistel; 12 January – 19 June 1918; Alfons Graf Montecuccoli; 19 June – 27 August 1918; Alois Sernetz; 27 August – 31 October 1918
- Victories: 1 auxiliary warship taken as prize (10,484 GRT)

General characteristics
- Class & type: As built: Type UB I submarine; After June 1915: U-10-class submarine
- Displacement: 127 tonnes (125 long tons) surfaced; 141 tonnes (139 long tons) submerged
- Length: 27.88 m (91 ft 6 in) (o/a); 23.62 m (77 ft 6 in) pressure hull
- Beam: 3.15 m (10 ft 4 in)
- Draught: 3.03 m (9 ft 11 in)
- Propulsion: 1 × shaft; 1 × Körting diesel engine, 60 bhp (45 kW); 1 × electric motor, 120 shp (89 kW)
- Speed: 6.5 knots (12.0 km/h; 7.5 mph) surfaced; 5.5 knots (10.2 km/h; 6.3 mph) submerged
- Range: 1,500 nmi (2,800 km; 1,700 mi) at 5 knots (9.3 km/h; 5.8 mph) surfaced; 45 nmi (83 km; 52 mi) at 4 knots (7.4 km/h; 4.6 mph) submerged
- Complement: 17
- Armament: 2 × 45 cm (17.7 in) torpedo tubes (both in front); 2 torpedoes; 1 × 66 mm (2.6 in)/18 (October 1916)

SM U-11 or U-XI was a U-10-class submarine in the Austro-Hungarian Navy (German: Kaiserliche und Königliche Kriegsmarine or K.u.K. Kriegsmarine) during World War I. She was originally a German Type UB I submarine commissioned into the German Imperial Navy (German: Kaiserliche Marine) as SM UB-15.

SM UB-15 was constructed in Germany and shipped by rail to Pola, where she was assembled and launched. She was commissioned into the German Imperial Navy in April and sank an Italian submarine in June. The boat was handed over to Austria-Hungary and commissioned as SM U-11 on 14 June. In early 1916, U-11 fired on a British submarine, but missed. After the end of the war, U-11 was handed over to Italy as a war reparation and scrapped at Pola by 1920.

== Design and construction ==
U-11 was a small coastal submarine that displaced 127 tonnes (125 long tons) surfaced and 141 tonnes (139 long tons) submerged. She featured a single shaft, a single 60 bhp (45 kW) Körting diesel engine for surface running, and a single 120 shp (89 kW) electric motor for submerged travel. U-11 was capable of up to 6.5 knots (12.0 km/h; 7.5 mph) while surfaced and 5.5 knots (10.2 km/h; 6.3 mph) while submerged at a diving depth of up to 50 metres (160 ft). She was designed for a crew of 17 officers and men.

U-11 was equipped with two 45 cm (17.7 in) torpedo tubes located in the front and carried a complement of two torpedoes. German Type UB I submarines were additionally equipped with a 8 mm (0.31 in) machine gun, but it is not clear from sources if U-11 – a former German boat – was fitted with one, or if it was, retained it in Austro-Hungarian service. In October 1916, U-11's armament was supplemented with a 66 mm (2.6 in)/18 (2.6 in) gun.

UB-15 was laid down on 9 November 1914 at AG Weser in Bremen. The submarine was shipped by rail in sections to Pola Navy Yard, where the sections were riveted together. There is no known surviving record of how long it took for UB-15's sections to be assembled. However, a similar ship (UB-3) was built in two weeks.

== Operational history ==
=== UB-15 ===
SM UB-15 was commissioned into the German Imperial Navy under the command of Oberleutnant zur See Heino von Heimburg on 11 April. An Austro-Hungarian Navy officer was assigned to the boat for piloting and training purposes. On 10 June, UB-15 sank the Italian submarine Medusa for a loss of 245 tons off Porto di Piave Vecchia in the Northern Adriatic. (Note: Sources differ as to whether the U-boat was under German or Austro-Hungarian ownership when she sank the Medusa. See Stern, p. 193.) Like all Type UB I and U-10 class submarines, UB-15 was equipped with compensating tanks designed to flood and offset the loss of one of the 1,700-pound (770 kg) C/06 torpedoes. However, they did not always function correctly; when firing from periscope depth the boat could broach after firing or, if too much weight was taken on, plunge to the depths. When UB-15 torpedoed and sank Medusa, the tank failed to properly compensate, forcing all of the crewmen to run to the stern to offset the trim imbalance and prevent the ship from sinking.

=== U-11 ===
On 18 June, UB-15 was handed over to the Austro-Hungarian Navy and commissioned as U-11 under the command of Linienschiffsleutnant Lüdwig Eberhardt. U-11 retained its German crew until 18 June 1916, when they were replaced by an all Austro-Hungarian one. In early 1916, U-11 unsuccessfully attacked the British submarine B8 in the Gulf of Fiume. U-11 captured one ship in her Austro-Hungarian service, and was handed over to Italy as a war reparation and scrapped at Pola by 1920.

== Summary of raiding history ==
Date	Name	Nationality	Tonnage	Fate
10 June 1915	Medusa	Regia Marina	245	Sunk
20 January 1916	König Albert	Kingdom of Italy	10,484	Captured as prize

== Bibliography ==
- Bendert, Harald (2000). Die UB-Boote der Kaiserlichen Marine, 1914-1918. Einsätze, Erfolge, Schicksal (in German). Hamburg: Verlag E.S. Mittler & Sohn GmbH. ISBN 3-8132-0713-7.
- Gröner, Erich; Jung, Dieter; Maass, Martin (1991). German Warships 1815–1945, U-boats and Mine Warfare Vessels. Vol. 2. Translated by Thomas, Keith; Magowan, Rachel. London: Conway Maritime Press. ISBN 0-85177-593-4.
- Compton-Hall, Richard (2004) [1991]. Submarines at war, 1914–18. Penzance: Periscope Publishing. ISBN 978-1-904381-21-1. OCLC 57639764.
- Freivogel, Zvonimir (2007). Austrougarske podmornice u I. svjetskom ratu = Austro-Hungarian submarines in world war I. Rijeka Viškovo: Adamić Digital point tiskara. ISBN 9789532193398.
- Gardiner, Robert; Gray, Randal, eds. (1985). Conway's All the World's Fighting Ships 1906–1921. Annapolis, Maryland: Naval Institute Press. ISBN 978-0-87021-907-8. OCLC 12119866.
- Messimer, Dwight R. (2002). Verschollen : World War I U-boat losses. Annapolis, Maryland: Naval Institute Press. ISBN 978-1-55750-475-3. OCLC 231973419.
- Stern, Robert Cecil (2007). The Hunter Hunted: Submarine versus Submarine: Encounters from World War I to the Present. Annapolis, Maryland: Naval Institute Press. ISBN 978-1-59114-379-6. OCLC 123127537.
