= SM UB-3 =

German U-boat during World War I

- UB-3 was similar in appearance to her sister boat SM UB-4, pictured here in 1915.

History

German Empire
- Name: UB-3
- Ordered: 15 November 1914
- Builder: Germaniawerft, Kiel
- Yard number: 241
- Laid down: 3 November 1914
- Launched: 5 March 1915
- Commissioned: 14 March 1915
- Fate: Disappeared after 23 May 1915

General characteristics
- Class & type: Type UB I submarine
- Displacement: 127 t (125 long tons) surfaced; 142 t (140 long tons) submerged
- Length: 28.10 m (92 ft 2 in) (o/a)
- Beam: 10 ft 6 in (3.20 m)
- Draft: 9 ft 10 in (3.00 m)
- Propulsion: 1 × propeller shaft; 1 × Daimler 4-cylinder diesel engine, 59 bhp (44 kW); 1 × Siemens-Schuckert electric motor, 119 shp (89 kW)
- Speed: 6.47 knots (11.98 km/h; 7.45 mph) surfaced; 5.51 knots (10.20 km/h; 6.34 mph) submerged
- Range: 1,650 nmi (3,060 km; 1,900 mi) at 5 knots (9.3 km/h; 5.8 mph) surfaced; 45 nmi (83 km; 52 mi) at 4 knots (7.4 km/h; 4.6 mph)
- Test depth: 50 metres (160 ft)
- Complement: 14
- Armament: 2 × 45 cm (17.7 in) bow torpedo tubes; 2 × torpedoes; 1 × 8 mm (0.31 in) machine gun
- Notes: 33-second diving time

Service record
- Part of: Pola Flotilla; 1 – 23 May 1915
- Commanders: Oblt.z.S. Siegfried Schmidt; 24 March – 23 May 1915
- Operations: 1 patrol
- Victories: None

SM UB-3 was a German Type UB I submarine or U-boat in the German Imperial Navy (German: Kaiserliche Marine) during World War I. She disappeared on her first patrol in May 1915, and was the first of her class to be lost.

UB-3 was ordered in October 1914 and was laid down at the Germaniawerft shipyard in Kiel in November. UB-3 was a little more than 28 metres (92 ft) in length and displaced between 127 and 142 metric tons (125 and 140 long tons), depending on whether surfaced or submerged. She carried two torpedoes for her two bow torpedo tubes and was also armed with a deck-mounted machine gun. She was launched and commissioned as SM UB-3 in March 1915. (Note: "SM" stands for "Seiner Majestät" (English: His Majesty's) and combined with the U for Unterseeboot would be translated as His Majesty's Submarine.)

UB-3 was broken into sections and shipped by rail to the Austro-Hungarian port of Pola in April for reassembly. She officially joined the Pola Flotilla on 1 May and departed on her first patrol for temporary duty in Turkey on 23 May, and was never seen again. A postwar German study concluded that UB-3 was likely the victim of an unexplained technical problem in the absence of any minefields or enemy action.

== Design and construction ==
After the German Army's rapid advance along the North Sea coast in the earliest stages of World War I, the German Imperial Navy found itself without suitable submarines that could be operated in the narrow and shallow environment off Flanders. Project 34, a design effort begun in mid-August 1914, produced the Type UB I design: a small submarine that could be shipped by rail to a port of operations and quickly assembled. Constrained by railroad size limitations, the UB I design called for a boat about 28 metres (92 ft) long and displacing about 125 metric tons (123 long tons) with two torpedo tubes. (Note: A further refinement of the design—replacing the torpedo tubes with mine chutes but changing little else—evolved into the Type UC I coastal minelaying submarine. See: Miller, p. 458.) UB-3 was part of the initial allotment of eight submarines—numbered UB-1 to UB-8—ordered on 15 October from Germaniawerft of Kiel, just shy of two months after planning for the class began.

UB-3 was laid down by Germaniawerft on 3 November and was launched on 5 March 1915. As built, UB-3 was 92 feet 2 inches (28.09 m) long, 3.15 metres (10 ft 4 in) abeam, and had a draft of 3.03 metres (9 ft 11 in). She had a single 59-brake-horsepower (44 kW) Daimler 4-cylinder diesel engine for surface travel, and a single 119-shaft-horsepower (89 kW) Siemens-Schuckert electric motor for underwater travel, both attached to a single propeller shaft. Her top speeds were 6.47 knots (11.98 km/h; 7.45 mph), surfaced, and 5.51 knots (10.20 km/h; 6.34 mph), submerged. At more moderate speeds, she could sail up to 1,650 nautical miles (3,060 km; 1,900 mi) on the surface before refueling, and up to 45 nautical miles (83 km; 52 mi) submerged before recharging her batteries. Like all boats of the class, UB-3 was rated to a diving depth of 50 metres (160 ft), and could completely submerge in 33 seconds.

UB-3 was armed with two 45-centimeter (17.7 in) torpedoes in two bow torpedo tubes. She was also outfitted for a single 8-millimeter (0.31 in) machine gun on deck. UB-3's complement consisted of one officer and thirteen enlisted men.

== Service career ==
The submarine was commissioned into the German Imperial Navy as SM UB-3 on 14 March under the command of Oberleutnant zur See Siegfried Schmidt, a 27-year-old, first-time U-boat skipper, (Note: Schmidt was in the Navy's April 1906 cadet class with 34 other future U-boat captains, including Wilhelm Marschall, Matthias Graf von Schmettow, Max Viebeg, and Erwin Waßner. See: Helgason, Guðmundur. "WWI Officer Crews: Crew 4/06". German and Austrian U-boats of World War I - Kaiserliche Marine - Uboat.net.) and underwent trials in German home waters.

As one of the UB I boats selected for Mediterranean duty, UB-3 was readied for rail shipment. The process of shipping a UB I boat involved breaking the submarine down into what was essentially a knock down kit. Each boat was broken into approximately fifteen pieces and loaded onto eight railway flatcars. UB-3 was shipped to the port of Pola, site of ally Austria-Hungary's main naval base, on 15 April. After UB-3's parts arrived at Pola, it took about two weeks to assemble them. UB-3 joined the Pola Flotilla (German: Deutsche U-Halbflotille Pola) on 1 May.

By late May, UB-3 had made her way down the Adriatic to the Austro–Hungarian port of Cattaro, the base from which most boats of the Pola Flotilla actually operated. (Note: Although the flotilla was based in Pola, boats of the flotilla operated out of Cattaro which was located farther south and closer to the Mediterranean. German U-boats typically returned to Pola only for repairs. See: Halpern, p. 384.) For her first patrol, UB-3 was loaded with ammunition for Turkish forces at İzmir, Turkey. Because of her limited range, UB-3 was towed by the light cruiser SMS Novara of the Austro-Hungarian Navy through the Straits of Otranto and cast off near the island of Kérkira. UB-3's planned route was south of the Ionian Islands, around the Peloponnese, through the Cyclades, north around Khios and Karaburun, and into the Gulf of İzmir. If all went well, UB-3 would have arrived at İzmir on 28 or 29 May with about half her fuel left. The Germans received a garbled radio message from UB-3 when she was about 80 nautical miles (150 km; 92 mi) from İzmir, but were unable to completely understand it. No trace of UB-3 has ever been found. UB-3 was the first of the UB I boats to be lost during the war.

A postwar German study concluded that UB-3's loss was probably the result of some unexplained technical problem, because there were no minefields along UB-3's route and no record of any attacks against U-boats in the area. British records, and some sources based on them, give the particulars of UB-3's demise as being in the North Sea on 24 April 1916, which authors R. H. Gibson and Maurice Prendergast assert was actually the fate of UB-13. They also point out that UB-3 had gone missing nearly a year before UB-3's supposed sinking in the North Sea.

== Bibliography ==
- Bendert, Harald (2000). Die UB-Boote der Kaiserlichen Marine, 1914-1918. Einsätze, Erfolge, Schicksal (in German). Hamburg: Verlag E.S. Mittler & Sohn GmbH. ISBN 3-8132-0713-7.
- Gröner, Erich; Jung, Dieter; Maass, Martin (1991). U-boats and Mine Warfare Vessels. German Warships 1815–1945. Vol. 2. Translated by Thomas, Keith; Magowan, Rachel. London: Conway Maritime Press. ISBN 0-85177-593-4.
- Gardiner, Robert; Gray, Randal, eds. (1985). Conway's All the World's Fighting Ships 1906–1921. Annapolis, Maryland: Naval Institute Press. ISBN 978-0-87021-907-8. OCLC 12119866.
- Gibson, R. H.; Maurice Prendergast (2003) [1931]. The German Submarine War, 1914–1918. Annapolis, Maryland: Naval Institute Press. ISBN 9781591143147. OCLC 52924732.
- Halpern, Paul G. (1994). A Naval History of World War I. Annapolis, Maryland: Naval Institute Press. ISBN 978-0-87021-266-6. OCLC 28411665.
- Karau, Mark D. (2003). Wielding the Dagger: the MarineKorps Flandern and the German War Effort, 1914–1918. Westport, Connecticut: Praeger. ISBN 978-0-313-32475-8. OCLC 51204317.
- Messimer, Dwight R. (2002). Verschollen: World War I U-boat losses. Annapolis, Maryland: Naval Institute Press. ISBN 978-1-55750-475-3. OCLC 231973419.
- Miller, David (2002). The Illustrated Directory of Submarines of the World. St. Paul, Minnesota: MBI Pub. Co. ISBN 978-0-7603-1345-9. OCLC 50208951.
- Miller, David (2002). The Illustrated Directory of Submarines of the World. St. Paul, Minnesota: MBI Pub. Co. ISBN 978-0-7603-1345-9. OCLC 50208951.
- Tarrant, V. E. (1989). The U-Boat Offensive: 1914–1945. Annapolis, Maryland: Naval Institute Press. ISBN 978-0-87021-764-7. OCLC 20338385.
- Williamson, Gordon (2002). U-boats of the Kaiser's Navy. Oxford: Osprey. ISBN 978-1-84176-362-0. OCLC 48627495.
