= List of Austro-Hungarian U-boats =

The Austro-Hungarian Navy (Kaiserliche und Königliche Kriegsmarine, shortened to k.u.k. Kriegsmarine) built a series of U-boats between 1907 and 1918 to defend its coastline and project naval power into the Adriatic and Mediterranean Seas in wartime. With the establishment of the Austrian Naval League in September 1904 and the appointment of Vice-Admiral Rudolf Montecuccoli to the post of Chief of the Naval Section of the War Ministry in October that same year, the k.u.k. Kriegsmarine began a program of naval expansion befitting a Great Power. Montecuccoli immediately pursued the efforts championed by his predecessor, Admiral Hermann von Spaun, and pushed to greatly expand and modernize the Austro-Hungarian Navy. By the spring of 1905, Montecuccoli envisioned a modern Austrian fleet of 12 battleships, four armoured cruisers, eight scout cruisers, 18 destroyers, 36 high seas torpedo craft, and six submarines.

The Austro-Hungarian U-boat fleet during the First World War mainly consisted of German designs built under licence and purchased units transported by rail from Germany's northern shipyards to the Austrian ports on the Adriatic Sea. They served throughout the war against Italian, French and British shipping in the Mediterranean Sea with some success, losing 8 of the 28 boats in service in return. Following the end of the war in 1918, all Austrian submarines were surrendered to the Entente powers, who disposed of them individually. As both Austria and Hungary became landlocked in the aftermath of the war, no Austrian or Hungarian submarines (or any other naval vessels) have been commissioned since.

In some sources Austro-Hungarian U-boats are referenced with Roman numerals as a way to distinguish them from German U-boats with similar numbers, but the Austro-Hungarian Navy itself used Arabic numerals. There are gaps in the numbering for several reasons. One series of Austro-Hungarian U-boats under construction in Germany was sold and commissioned into the Imperial German Navy. In other cases, U-boats commissioned into the Imperial German Navy were temporarily assigned Austro-Hungarian numbers when they operated in the Mediterranean. One final reason, in the case of the unassigned U-13, was superstition.

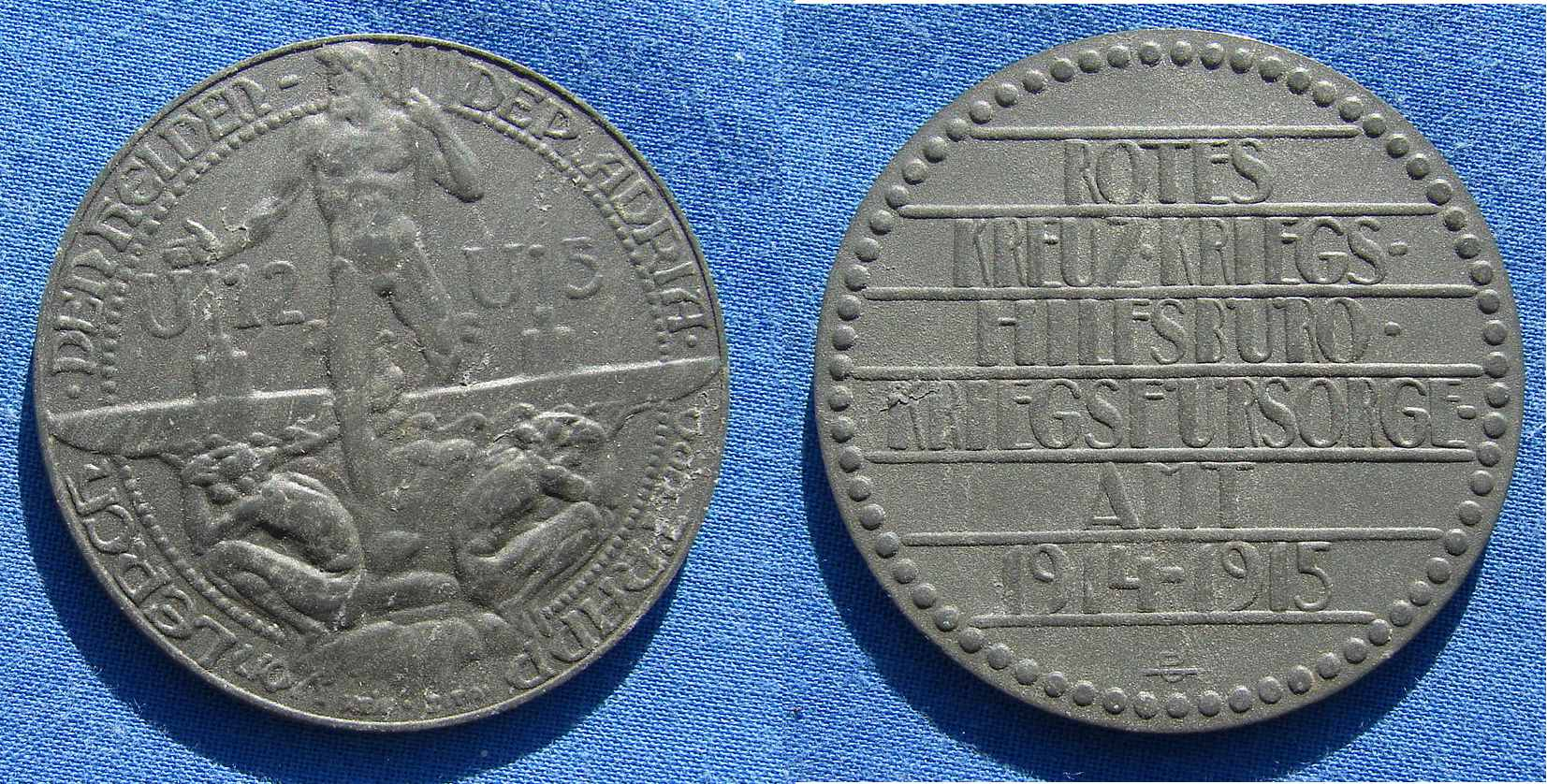
Austrian Red Cross WWI Medal 1915, picturing U 5 and U 12

== Austro-Hungarian U-boats ==
=== Commissioned ===
U-boat	Class	Launched	Commissioned	Fate	Notes
SM U-1	U-1 class	2 October 1909	15 April 1911	Scrapped 1920	
SM U-2	U-1 class	3 April 1909	22 May 1911	Scrapped 1920	
SM U-3	U-3 class	8 August 1908	12 September 1909	Sunk 13 August 1915	
SM U-4	U-3 class	20 November 1908	29 August 1909	Scrapped 1920	
SM U-5	U-5 class	10 February 1909	1 April 1910	Scrapped 1920	
SM U-6	U-5 class	12 June 1909	1 July 1910	Scuttled 13 May 1916	
SM U-10	U-10 class	29 January 1915	12 July 1915	Mined 9 July 1918; scrapped 1918	The former German SM UB-1
SM U-11	U-10 class	4 April 1915	20 June 1915	Scrapped 1920	The former German SM UB-15
SM U-12	U-5 class	14 March 1911	21 August 1914	Sunk 12 August 1916	Raised and scrapped end of 1916
SM U-14	U-14 class	18 July 1912	1 June 1915	Returned to France, 1919; scrapped 1929	Captured French submarine Curie (Q 87)
SM U-15	U-10 class	April 1915	6 October 1915	Scrapped 1920	
SM U-16	U-10 class	26 April 1915	6 October 1915	Sunk	
SM U-17	U-10 class	21 April 1915	6 October 1915	Scrapped 1920	
SM U-20	U-20 class	18 September 1916	20 October 1917	Sunk 4 July 1918	Wreck raised in 1962; conning tower on display in Vienna
SM U-21	U-20 class	15 August 1916	15 August 1917	Scrapped 1920	
SM U-22	U-20 class	27 January 1917	23 November 1917	Scrapped 1920	
SM U-23	U-20 class	5 January 1917	1 September 1917	Sunk 21 February 1918	
SM U-27	U-27 class	19 October 1916	24 February 1917	Scrapped 1920	
SM U-28	U-27 class	8 January 1917	26 May 1917	Scrapped 1920	
SM U-29	U-27 class	21 October 1916	21 January 1917	Scrapped 1920	
SM U-30	U-27 class	27 December 1916	17 February 1917	Went missing after 31 March 1917	
SM U-31	U-27 class	28 March 1917	24 April 1917	Scrapped 1920	
SM U-32	U-27 class	11 May 1917	29 June 1917	Scrapped 1920	
SM U-40	U-27 class	21 April 1917	4 August 1917	Scrapped 1920	
SM U-41	U-27 class	11 November 1917	19 February 1918	Scrapped 1920	
SM U-43	U-43 class	8 April 1916	30 July 1917	Scrapped 1920	The former German SM UB-43
SM U-47	U-43 class	17 June 1916	30 July 1917	Scrapped 1920	The former German SM UB-47

=== Other ===
Submarines on which construction was begun but which were not completed or commissioned during World War I are included in this table.

U-boat	Class	Laid down/Launched/Commissioned	Fate
U-48	U-48 class	laid down, not launched or completed	scrapped at war's end
U-49	U-48 class	laid down, not launched or completed	scrapped at war's end
U-50	U-50 class	laid down, not launched or completed	scrapped at war's end
U-51	U-50 class	laid down, not launched or completed	scrapped at war's end
U-52	U-52 class	laid down, not launched or completed	scrapped at war's end
U-53	U-52 class	laid down, not launched or completed	scrapped at war's end
U-101	U-101 class	laid down, not launched or completed	scrapped at war's end
U-102	U-101 class	laid down, not launched or completed	scrapped at war's end
U-103	U-101 class	laid down, not launched or completed	scrapped at war's end
U-107	U-107 class	laid down, not launched or completed	scrapped at war's end
U-108	U-107 class	laid down, not launched or completed	scrapped at war's end

== German U-boats operating under the Austro-Hungarian flag ==
After Italy had entered World War I by declaring war on Austria-Hungary on 23 May 1915, Germany felt treaty-bound to support the Austrians in attacks against Italian ships, even though Germany and Italy were not officially at war. As a result, German U-boats operating in Mediterranean were assigned Austro-Hungarian numbers and flags. In some cases the same Austro-Hungarian numbers were assigned to different German U-boats. After 28 August 1916, when Germany and Italy were officially at war, the practice continued, primarily to avoid charges of flag misuse. The practice was largely ended by 1 October 1916 except for a few large U-boats that continued using Austro-Hungarian numbers.

German U-boats under the Austro-Hungarian flag
Austro-Hungarian name	German U-boat name(s)
SM U-7	SM UB-7
SM U-8	SM UB-8
SM U-9	SM UB-3 (Note: Conway's (p. 341) lists UB-9 as the Austro-Hungarian U-9, but that boat was a training boat at Kiel and not a part of the German Pola Flotilla.)
SM U-18	SM UC-14
SM U-19	SM UC-15
SM U-24	SM UC-12
SM U-25	SM UC-13
SM U-26	SM UB-14
SM U-33	SM U-33
SM U-34	SM U-34
SM U-35	SM U-35
SM U-36	SM U-21; SM U-47
SM U-37	SM U-32
SM U-38	SM U-38
SM U-39	SM U-39
SM U-42	SM UB-42
SM U-44	SM UB-44
SM U-45	SM UB-45
SM U-46	SM UB-46
SM U-54	SM UB-128
SM U-55	SM UB-129
SM U-56	SM UB-130
SM U-57	SM UB-131
SM U-58	SM UB-132
SM U-60	SM UC-20
SM U-62	SM UC-22
SM U-63	SM UC-23; SM UC-63
SM U-64	SM U-64
SM U-65	SM U-65
SM U-66	SM UB-66; SM UC-66
SM U-67	SM UB-67
SM U-68	SM UB-68
SM U-69	SM UB-69; SM UC-69
SM U-70	SM UB-70
SM U-71	SM UB-71
SM U-72	SM U-72
SM U-73	SM U-73
SM U-74	SM UC-34
SM U-75	SM UC-35
SM U-77	SM UC-37
SM U-78	SM UC-16; SM UC-38
SM U-79	SM UB-48
SM U-80	SM UB-49
SM U-81	SM UB-50
SM U-82	SM UB-51
SM U-83	SM U-63; SM UB-52; SM UC-20; SM UC-23
SM U-88	SM UC-24
SM U-89	SM UC-25
SM U-92	SM UC-73
SM U-93	SM UC-74
SM U-94	SM UC-52
SM U-95	SM UC-53
SM U-96	SM UC-54
SM U-97	SM UB-105
SM U-99	SM UC-103
SM U-110	SM UC-108
SM U-133	SM UB-133
SM U-134	SM UB-134
SM U-135	SM UB-135
SM U-146	SM UB-146
SM U-147	SM UB-147

== Bibliography ==
- Jane's Fighting Ships of World War One, Originally published 1919, Republished by Random House Ltd, Great Britain: 1990. ISBN 1-85170-378-0.
- Gardiner, Robert, ed. (1985). Conway's All the World's Fighting Ships 1906–1921. Annapolis, Maryland: Naval Institute Press. ISBN 978-0-87021-907-8. OCLC 12119866.
- Vego, Milan N. (1996). Austro-Hungarian Naval Policy, 1904–14. London: Frank Cass Publishers. ISBN 978-0-7146-4209-3. OCLC 560641850.
