= U-1-class submarine =

U-1 class submarine may refer to:

- U-1-class submarine (Austria-Hungary), a class of two submarines built 1909–1910
- U-1-class submarine (Germany), a class of one submarine built 1906
- U-1-class submarine (Sweden), a class of nine submarines built 1941–144
