= SM U-1 (Austria-Hungary) =

Austro-Hungarian Navy's U-1-class submarine

- U-1 departs the harbor at Pola in 1914

History

Austria-Hungary
- Name: SM U-1
- Ordered: 24 November 1906
- Builder: Pola Navy Yard, Pola
- Laid down: 2 July 1907
- Launched: 10 February 1909
- Commissioned: 15 April 1911
- Refit: late 1914–early 1915
- Fate: Transferred to State of Slovenes, Croats and Serbs on 31 October 1918

State of Slovenes, Croats and Serbs
- Name: U-1
- Acquired: 31 October 1918
- Fate: Handed over to the Allied powers on 10 November 1918

Italy
- Name: U-1
- Acquired: 9 November 1918
- Fate: Ceded to Italy under the Treaty of Saint-Germain-en-Laye in 1920 and broken up at Pola

Service record
- Commanders: Egon Marchetti; 15 April – 20 September 1911; Otto Zeidler; 20 September 1911 – 8 July 1913; Narciss Blessich; 18 July 1913 – 2 May 1914; Franz Nejebsy; 26 June 1914 – 17 December 1915; Klemens Ritter von Bezard; 17 December 1915 – 27 May 1916; Franz Nejebsy; 27 May 1916 – 18 January 1917; Eugen Hornyák Edler von Horn; 18 January – 13 September 1917; Othmar Printz; 28 March – 31 October 1918
- Victories: None

General characteristics (as built)
- Type: U-1-class submarine
- Displacement: 229.7 t (226 long tons; 253 short tons) surfaced; 248.9 t (245 long tons; 274 short tons) submerged
- Length: 30.48 m (100 ft 0 in)
- Beam: 4.8 m (15 ft 9 in)
- Draft: 3.85 m (12 ft 8 in)
- Propulsion: 2 × shafts; 2 × gasoline engines, 720 bhp (540 kW) total; 2 × electric motors, 200 bhp (150 kW) total
- Speed: 10.3 knots (19.1 km/h; 11.9 mph) surfaced; 6 knots (11 km/h; 6.9 mph) submerged
- Range: 950 nmi (1,760 km; 1,090 mi) at 6 knots (11 km/h; 6.9 mph), surfaced; 40 nmi (74 km; 46 mi) at 2 knots (3.7 km/h; 2.3 mph), submerged
- Test depth: 40 meters (131 ft 3 in)
- Complement: 17
- Armament: 3 × 45 cm (17.7 in) torpedo tubes (two front, one rear); 5 torpedoes

General characteristics (after modernization)
- Displacement: 223.0 t (219 long tons; 246 short tons) surfaced; 277.5 t (273 long tons; 306 short tons) submerged
- Length: 30.76 m (100 ft 11 in)
- Propulsion: 2 × shafts; 2 × diesel engines, 720 bhp (540 kW) total; 2 × electric motors, 200 bhp (150 kW) total
- Armament: 3 × 45 cm (17.7 in) torpedo tubes (two front, one rear); 5 torpedoes; 1 × 37 mm (1.5 in) deck gun (installed in 1917, removed in January 1918)

SM U-1 or U-I was the lead boat of the U-1-class of submarines or U-boats built for and operated by the Austro-Hungarian Navy (German: kaiserliche und königliche Kriegsmarine or k.u.k. Kriegsmarine). U-1 was designed by American naval architect Simon Lake of the Lake Torpedo Boat Company, and constructed at the Navy Yard in Pola. She was one of two Lake-designed submarines purchased as part of a competitive evaluation of foreign submarine designs after domestic proposals were rejected by the Navy.

Ordered on 24 November 1906, U-1 was laid down in July 1907 before being launched in February 1909. She was 30.48 meters (100 ft 0 in) long and displaced 229.7 metric tons (226 long tons; 253 short tons) while surfaced and 248.9 metric tons (245 long tons; 274 short tons) while submerged. An experimental design, U-1 included unique features such as a diving chamber and wheels for traveling along the seabed. Originally powered by gasoline engines for surface running, sea trials throughout 1909 and 1910 showed these engines to be incapable of reaching the submarine's contracted speed and to pose a risk of poisoning the crew. U-1 was commissioned in April 1911 and served as a training boat through 1914, though she was mobilized briefly during the Balkan Wars. U-1's design has been described by naval historians as a failure that was rendered obsolete by the time she was commissioned into the Austro-Hungarian Navy. Despite these criticisms, tests of her design provided information which the Navy used to construct subsequent submarines.

At the beginning of World War I, U-1 was in drydock awaiting new batteries and replacement diesel engines. U-1 returned to service as a training boat until October 1915. From November she conducted reconnaissance cruises out of Trieste and Pola until being declared obsolete in early 1918. She continued to serve in a training role at the submarine base on Brioni, but was at Pola at the end of the war. Facing defeat in October 1918, the Austro-Hungarian government transferred its navy to the newly formed State of Slovenes, Croats and Serbs to avoid having to hand its ships over to the Allied Powers. Following the Armistice of Villa Giusti in November 1918, U-1 was seized by Italian forces and subsequently granted to the Kingdom of Italy under the Treaty of Saint-Germain-en-Laye in 1920. Italy chose to scrap the submarine, and she was broken up at Pola later that same year without ever having sunk or damaged any vessels during her career.

== Background ==
Prior to 1904, the Austro-Hungarian Navy had shown little to no interest in submarines, preferring to instead observe other navies experiment with the relatively new type of ship. In early 1904, after allowing the navies of other countries to pioneer submarine developments, Constructor General (German: Generalschiffbauingenieur) of the Austro-Hungarian Navy Siegfried Popper, ordered the Naval Technical Committee (German: Marinetechnisches Kommittee, MTK) to produce a submarine design. Technical problems during the initial design phase, however, delayed further any proposals from MTK for nearly a year.

After observing the MTK design submitted in early 1905, the Naval Section of the War Ministry (German: Marinesektion) remained skeptical. Additional proposals submitted by the public as part of a design competition were all rejected as well by the Austro-Hungarian Navy as being impracticable. As a result, the Navy decided to purchase designs from three different foreign firms for a class of submarines. Each design was to be accompanied by two submarines to test each ship against one another. This was done to properly evaluate the different proposals which would come forward. Simon Lake, owner of the Lake Torpedo Boat Company of Bridgeport, Connecticut, was chosen as one of the participants in this design competition by the Navy. After being recommended by Popper, Lake traveled to Austria-Hungary in 1906 to negotiate the details of his contract with the Navy, which formally ordered plans for the building of two boats—including U-1—on 24 November.

== Design ==
Although intended to serve as an experimental design when initially ordered, U-1 and her sister ship U-2 would be the first submarines of the Austro-Hungarian Navy. However, both ships would prove to be a disappointment. U-1 and her sister ship were described by the naval historians David Dickson, Vincent O'Hara, and Richard Worth as "obsolete and unreliable when completed and suffered from problems even after modifications". René Greger, another naval historian, wrote that U-1 and her sister ship "proved a total failure".

Despite these criticisms and shortcomings, the experimental nature of the submarine provided valuable information for the Austro-Hungarian Navy, and Lake's designs did address what the Navy was asking for when ordering the submarine class. John Poluhowich writes in his book Argonaut: The Submarine Legacy of Simon Lake that U-1 was "completed to the satisfaction of Austrian officials". Lake himself praised both ships, particularly their periscopes.

Simon Lake, designer of the U-1-class submarines

Our company had built the first two boats for the Austrian Government, U-1 and U-2. Another type of boat had been built later which had only a fixed periscope...One day, when this submarine was running along with her periscope above the surface...some officers approached in a speedy little launch and left their cards tied to the periscope without the knowledge of the commander of the submerged vessel. This demonstrated perfectly that it is essential, both in war and peace times, for the commander of the submarine to know what is going on in his vicinity on the surface.

— Simon Lake, The Submarine in War and Peace: Its Developments and Possibilities (1918)

U-1 was constructed in line with Austro-Hungarian naval policy at the time, which stressed coastal defense and patrolling of the Adriatic Sea. Following the onset of World War I, however, it became clear that Austro-Hungarian U-boats were best suited for offensive operations, namely raiding Allied shipping in the Adriatic and Mediterranean Seas.

=== General characteristics ===
Built with a double hull, U-1 had an overall length of 30.48 meters (100 ft), with a beam of 4.8 meters (15 ft 9 in) and a draught of 3.85 meters (12 ft 8 in). U-1 was designed to displace 229.7 metric tons (226 long tons; 253 short tons) while surfaced, but while submerged she displaced 248.9 metric tons (245.0 long tons; 274.4 short tons). After her modernization, the length of U-1 was increased to 30.76 meters (100 ft 11 in).

U-1 was derived from an earlier concept for a submarine intended for peaceful sea exploration. As a result, she had several features typical of Lake's earlier designs. These including a diving chamber under the bow and two variable pitch propellers. The diving chamber was intended for manned underwater missions such as destroying ships with explosives and severing off-shore telegraph cables, as well as for exiting or entering the submarine during an emergency. This diving chamber ultimately proved its usefulness during the sea trials of U-1 and her sister ship when the crew of one submarine forgot to bring their lunches on-board before conducting an underwater endurance test. A diver from shore was able to transport lunch for the crew without the submarine having to resurface. Lake's design also called for two retractable wheels that, in theory, could allow travel over the seabed. The design also placed the diving tanks above the waterline of the cylindrical hull, which necessitated a heavy ballast keel for vertical stability. The location of the diving tanks also necessitated flooding to be done by pumps.

The propulsion system for U-1 consisted of two gasoline engines for surface running and two electric motors for running submerged. The gasoline engines could produce 720 bhp (540 kW), while the electric motors had an output of 200 bhp (150 kW). These engines could produce a speed of 10.3 knots (19.1 km/h; 11.9 mph) while surfaced, and 6 knots (11 km/h; 6.9 mph) when submerged. U-1 had an operational range of 950 nautical miles (1,760 km; 1,090 mi) while traveling at 6 knots (11 km/h; 6.9 mph) when surfaced, and 40 nmi (74 km; 46 mi) while traveling at 2 knots (3.7 km/h; 2.3 mph) when submerged. For underwater steering, her design featured four pairs of diving planes. These planes provided the submarines with a considerable amount of maneuverability.

The submarine had three 45-centimeter (17.7 in) torpedo tubes—two in the bow, one in the stern—and could carry up to five torpedoes, but typically carried three. In 1917, U-1 was fitted with a 37-millimeter (1.5 in) deck gun, which was ultimately removed in January 1918 when the submarine resumed training duties. U-1 was designed for a crew of 17 officers and men.

== Construction and commissioning ==
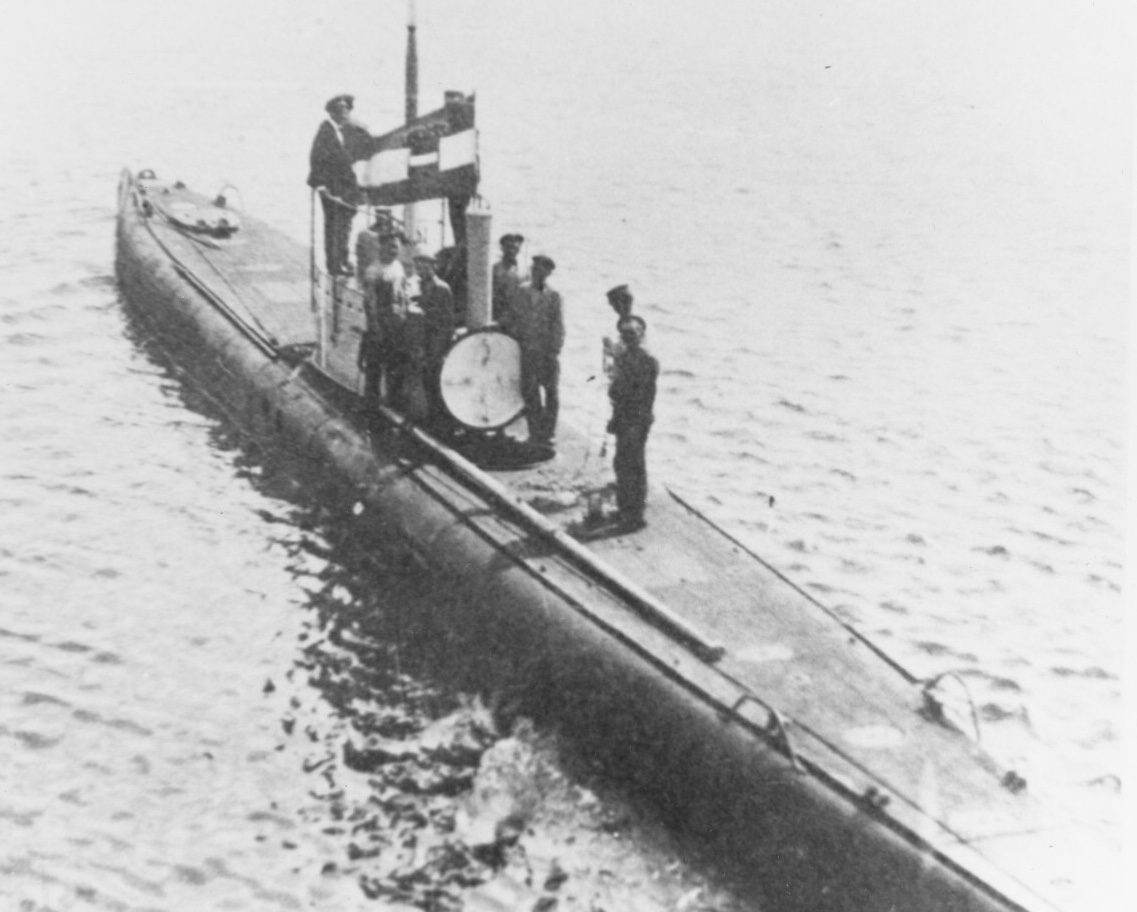
A U-1-class submarine surfaced

U-1 was laid down on 2 July 1907 at the Pola Navy Yard (German: Seearsenal) in Pola. Construction on the submarine was delayed by the need to import the American-made engines. As the first ship of her class, U-1 was launched on 10 February 1908. (Note: In their book The German Submarine War, 1914–1918, R. H. Gibson and Maurice Prendergast report that U-1 was launched in 1911 and U-2 in 1910. (p. 383))

Upon completion of the submarine, the Austro-Hungarian Navy evaluated U-1 in sea trials throughout 1909 and 1910. These trials were considerably longer than other sea trials due to the experimental nature of the submarines and the desire of Austro-Hungarian naval officials to test every possible aspect of the ship. During these trials, extensive technical problems with the gasoline engines of both submarines were revealed. Exhaust fumes and gasoline vapors frequently poisoned the air inside the boat and increased the risk of internal explosions, while the engines themselves were not able reach the contracted speed, which was supposed to be 12 knots (22 km/h) while surfaced and 7 knots (13 km/h) while submerged. (Note: Jiri Novak reports in his book Austro-Hungarian Submarines in World War I that U-1's sister ship, U-2, had equally inadequate engines. (p. 16)) Indeed, the engine problems for U-1 were so significant that on multiple occasions her crew had to conduct emergency resurfacing to bring fresh air into the ship. Because of the problems, the Austro-Hungarian Navy considered the engines to be unsuitable for wartime use and paid only for the hulls and armament of U-1. While replacement diesel engines were ordered from the Austrian firm Maschinenfabrik Leobersdorf, they agreed to a lease of the gasoline engines at a fee of $4,544 USD annually for both U-1 and her sister ship U-2.

Flooding the diving tanks, which was necessary to dive, took over 14 minutes and 37 seconds in early tests, but was later reduced to 8 minutes. Despite the engine problems, U-1 and her sister ship had the best performance in diving and steering among the U-boats under evaluation by the Navy. At a depth of 40 meters (130 ft) her hull began to show signs of stress and was in danger of being crushed. As a result, the commission overseeing U-1's sea trials set her maximum dive depth at 40 meters (130 ft). While surfaced, the shape of U-1's hull resulted in a significant bow-wave, which led to the bow of the ship dipping under the water while surfaced. In order to correct this problem, the deck and bow casing of the submarine was reconstructed in January 1915. Other tests proved the use of U-1's underwater wheels on the seabed to be almost impossible. On 5 April both of U-1's electric motors were damaged in a flooding incident during her trials.

== Service history ==
=== Pre-war ===
U-1 was commissioned into the Austro-Hungarian Navy on 15 April 1911 and served as a training boat—conducting up to ten training cruises per month—through 1914. Despite being used primarily for training duties, U-1 was mobilized in late 1912 during the Balkan Wars. By the end of November 1912, the threat of conflict between Austria-Hungary, Italy, Serbia, and Russia, coupled with allegations of Serbian mistreatment of the Austro-Hungarian consul in Prisrena led to a war scare in the Balkans. Both Russia and Austria-Hungary began mobilizing troops along their border, while Austria-Hungary began to mobilize against Serbia. During the crisis, the entire Austro-Hungarian Navy was also fully mobilized. U-1 and her sister ship U-2 were both ordered to join the rest of the Austro-Hungarian fleet assembling in the Aegean Sea in the event of a war with Serbia and Russia.

By December 1912, the Austro-Hungarian Navy had, in addition to U-1 and U-2, a total of seven battleships, six cruisers, eight destroyers, 28 torpedo boats, and four submarines ready for combat. The crisis eventually subsided after the signing of the Treaty of London, and the Austro-Hungarian Army and Navy were subsequently demobilized on 28 May 1913. After demobilization, U-1 resumed her duties as a training vessel. While conducting one of these training cruises on 13 January 1914 near Fasana, she was rammed by the Austro-Hungarian armored cruiser Sankt Georg. The damage caused by this collision destroyed the submarine's periscope.

=== World War I ===
The conning tower of U-1 in March 1917

The outbreak of World War I found U-1 in drydock awaiting the installation of new batteries and diesel engines. To accommodate the new engines, she underwent a refit which lasted until early 1915. This refit lengthened the submarine by about 11 inches (28 cm). The modifications and new engines lowered her surface displacement to 223.0 tonnes (245.8 short tons) but increased the submarine's submerged displacement to 277.5 tonnes (305.9 short tons). Upon completion of this refit in early 1915, U-1 returned to training duties through 4 October, and was thereafter stationed at Trieste on 2 November. The relocation of U-1 to Trieste was undertaken in part to dissuade Italian naval attacks or raids on the crucial Austro-Hungarian city, and her deployment to the city helped to dissuade Italian plans to bombard the port, as Italian military intelligence suggested both U-1 and U-2 were on regular patrol in the waters of the northern Adriatic. From Trieste, U-1 conducted regular reconnaissance cruises until 22 December 1917, when she was reassigned to the naval base at Pola. On 11 January 1918, U-1 was declared obsolete alongside her sister ship, but was retained as a training boat at the Austro-Hungarian submarine base located on Brioni Island. In mid-1918, U-1 was considered a potential candidate for service as a minesweeper, as the diving chamber present on the submarine could allow divers to sever the anchoring cables of sea mines. The poor condition of the submarine, however, prevented the plan from being implemented.

Near the end of the war, she was once more taken to Pola, though it had become clear by October 1918 that Austria-Hungary was facing defeat in the war. With various attempts to quell nationalist sentiments failing, Emperor Karl I decided to sever Austria-Hungary's alliance with Germany and appeal to the Allied Powers in an attempt to preserve the empire from complete collapse. On 26 October, Austria-Hungary informed Germany that their alliance was over. In Pola, the Austro-Hungarian Navy was in the process of tearing itself apart along ethnic and nationalist lines. On 29 October the National Council in Zagreb announced Croatia's dynastic ties to Hungary had come to a formal conclusion. This new provisional government, while throwing off Hungarian rule, had not yet declared independence from Austria-Hungary. Thus Emperor Karl I's government in Vienna asked the State of Slovenes, Croats and Serbs for help maintaining the fleet stationed at Pola and keeping order among the navy. The National Council refused to assist unless the Austro-Hungarian Navy was first placed under its command. Emperor Karl I, still attempting to save the Empire from collapse, agreed to the transfer, provided that the other "nations" which made up Austria-Hungary would be able to claim their fair share of the value of the fleet at a later time. All sailors not of Slovene, Croatian, Bosnian, or Serbian background were thus placed on leave for the time being, while the officers were given the choice of joining the new navy or retiring.

Through this transfer, the Austro-Hungarian government decided to hand over its fleet to the State of Slovenes, Croats and Serbs without a shot being fired. This was considered preferential to handing the fleet to the Allies, as the new state had declared its neutrality. Furthermore, the State of Slovenes, Croats and Serbs had also not yet publicly rejected Emperor Karl I, keeping alive the possibility of reforming the Empire into a triple monarchy. The transfer to the State of Slovenes, Croats and Serbs took place on the morning of 31 October, with Rear Admiral (German: Konteradmiral) Miklós Horthy meeting representatives from the South Slav nationalities aboard his flagship, Viribus Unitis. The arrangements were settled and the handover was completed that afternoon with the Austro-Hungarian Naval Ensign being struck from all ships in the harbor.

=== Post-war ===
Under the terms of the Armistice of Villa Giusti, signed between Italy and Austria-Hungary on 3 November 1918, the transfer of Austria-Hungary's fleet to the State of Slovenes, Croats and Serbs was not recognized. Italian ships thus sailed into the ports of Trieste, Pola, and Fiume the following day. On 5 November, Italian troops occupied the naval installations at Pola. The State of Slovenes, Croats and Serbs lacked the men and officers to hold the fleet as most sailors who were not South Slavs had already gone home. Furthermore, the National Council did not order any men to resist the Italians, preferring to instead condemn Italy's actions as illegitimate. On 9 November, all remaining ships in Pola harbor had the Italian flag raised, including U-1. At a conference at Corfu, the Allied Powers agreed the transfer of Austria-Hungary's Navy to the State of Slovenes, Croats and Serbs was invalid, despite sympathy from the United Kingdom. Faced with the prospect of being given an ultimatum to surrender the former Austro-Hungarian warships, the National Council agreed to hand over the ships beginning on 10 November 1918.

It would not be until 1920 that the final distribution of the ships was settled among the Allied powers under the terms of the Treaty of Saint-Germain-en-Laye. Both U-1 and U-2 were subsequently ceded to Italy as war reparations and scrapped at Pola that same year. Due to the training and reconnaissance missions she engaged in throughout the war, U-1 did not sink or damage any ships during her career.
