= SM U-22 (Austria-Hungary) =

Austro-Hungarian Navy's U-20-class submarine

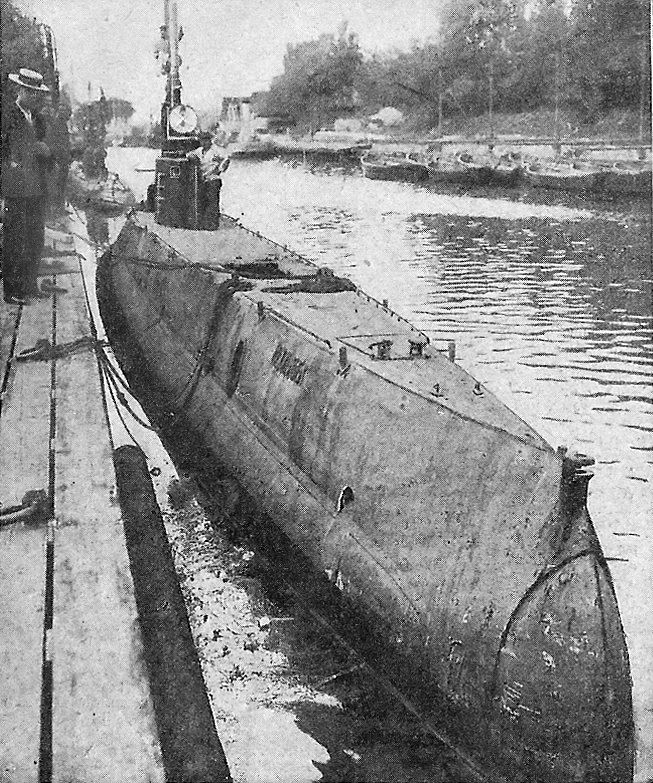
- The design for U-22 was based on the Havmanden class of the Royal Danish Navy (Havmanden pictured)

History

Austria-Hungary
- Name: SM U-22
- Ordered: 27 March 1915
- Builder: Hungarian UBAG yard, Fiume
- Laid down: Mid 1915
- Launched: 27 January 1917
- Commissioned: 23 November 1917
- Fate: Ceded to France, scrapped 1920

Service record
- Commanders: Josef Holub; 25 February – 29 December 1917; Friedrich Sterz; 29 December 1917 – 31 October 1918
- Victories: None

General characteristics
- Type: U-20-class submarine
- Displacement: 173 t, surfaced; 210 t, submerged
- Length: 127 ft 2 in (38.76 m)
- Beam: 13 ft (4.0 m)
- Draft: 9 ft (2.7 m)
- Propulsion: 1 × shaft; 1 × diesel engine, 450 bhp (340 kW); 1 × electric motor, 160 shp (120 kW)
- Speed: 12 knots (22 km/h) surfaced; 9 knots (17 km/h) submerged
- Range: 1,400 nautical miles (2,600 km) at 10 knots (19 km/h) surfaced; 23 nautical miles (43 km) at 8 knots (15 km/h) submerged
- Complement: 18
- Armament: 2 × 45 cm (17.7 in) torpedo tubes (both in front); 2 torpedoes; 1 × 66 mm (2.6 in) deck gun; 1 × 8 mm (0.31 in) machine gun

SM U-22 or U-XXII was a U-20-class submarine or U-boat built for and operated by the Austro-Hungarian Navy (German: Kaiserliche und Königliche Kriegsmarine or K.u.K. Kriegsmarine) during the First World War. The design for U-22 was based on submarines of the Royal Danish Navy's Havmanden class (three of which had been built in Austria-Hungary), and was largely obsolete by the beginning of the war.

U-22 was just over 127 feet (39 m) long and was armed with two bow torpedo tubes, a deck gun, and a machine gun. The submarine was laid down in mid 1915 and launched in January 1917. The still unfinished U-boat sank in the harbor at Fiume in June but was raised, repaired, and relaunched in October. After her commissioning in November, U-22 patrolled off the Po River estuary and, later, in the northern Adriatic out of Trieste.

After undergoing months of repairs for her failed electric motor in mid 1918, U-22 returned to duty and patrolled off the Montenegrin coast out of Cattaro in August. At Cattaro at the end of World War I, U-22 was ceded to France as a war reparation and scrapped in 1920. U-22 had no wartime successes.

== Design and construction ==
When it became apparent to the Austro-Hungarian Navy that the First World War would not be a short one, they moved to bolster their U-boat fleet by seizing the plans for the Danish Havmanden class submarines, three of which had been built at Whitehead & Co. in Fiume. Although the Austro-Hungarian Navy was not happy with the design, which was largely obsolete, it was the only design for which plans were available and which could be begun immediately in domestic shipyards. The Austro-Hungarian Navy unenthusiastically placed orders for U-22 and her three sister boats on 27 March 1915.

U-22 was one of two boats of the class to be built at the Hungarian UBAG yard in Fiume. Due to demands by the Hungarian government, subcontracts for the class were divided between Hungarian and Austrian firms, and this politically expedient solution worsened technical problems with the design, resulting in numerous modifications and delays for the class in general.

U-22 was an ocean-going submarine that displaced 173 tonnes (191 short tons) surfaced and 210 tonnes (231 short tons) submerged and was designed for a complement of 18. She was 127 feet 2 inches (38.76 m) long with a beam of 13 feet (4.0 m) and a draft of 9 feet (2.7 m). For propulsion, she featured a single shaft, a single 450 bhp (340 kW) diesel engine for surface running, and a single 160 shp (120 kW) electric motor for submerged travel. She was capable of 12 knots (22 km/h) while surfaced and 9 knots (17 km/h) while submerged. Although there is no specific notation of a range for U-22, the Havmanden class, upon which the U-20 class was based, had a range of 1,400 nautical miles (2,600 km) at 10 knots (19 km/h), surfaced, and 23 nautical miles (43 km) at 8 knots (15 km/h) submerged.

U-22 was armed with two 45 cm (17.7 in) torpedo tubes located in the front and carried a complement of two torpedoes. She was also equipped with a 66 mm (2.6 in) deck gun and an 8 mm (0.31 in) machine gun.

U-22 was laid down at Fiume in mid 1915 and launched on 27 January 1917, the last of the four U-20-class boats to be launched. On 10 June, while not yet complete, the U-boat sank in the harbor at Fiume. Raised from her resting point at a depth of 9 meters (30 ft) the following day, U-22 underwent four months of repairs. She was launched again on 6 October.

== Service career ==
On 18 November 1917 the U-boat sailed for Pola, where she was commissioned as SM U-22 on 23 November under the command of Linienschiffsleutnant Josef Holub. The 31-year-old Galician had been assigned to U-22 in February and had been in charge of sister boat U-21 from June 1916 until his assignment to U-22.

Holub led U-22 out on her first patrol when they departed Pola on 5 December for duty off the Po estuary. After returning to Pola on 10 December, Holub led U-22 on another Po estuary tour from 15 to 17 December. On 29 December, Holub was transferred to U-27. His replacement was Linienschiffsleutnant Friedrich Sterz. It was the first U-boat command of the 25-year-old native of Pergine, Tyrolia (in present-day Italy). (Note: Sterz would go on to command U-10 and U-29 before the war ended.)

On 3 January 1918, Sterz returned U-22 to the Po estuary for a third patrol there. While in the area, an enemy submarine was spotted but no attack could be made because of bad weather; the same bad weather forced U-22 to put in at Rovigno the following day. Setting out from Rovigno on 5 January, U-22 unsuccessfully attacked an Italian torpedo boat and two steamships. After a return to Rovigno on 6 January, Sterz steered his boat to the submarine base at Brioni. Ten days later, U-22 headed to Trieste, where she conducted patrols in the northern Adriatic. On 5 February, U-22 avoided being hit by seven bombs dropped by an enemy airplane. Departing the northern Adriatic in late April, U-22 was headed for Cattaro when her electric motor failed. After a quick stop at Cattaro, U-22 returned to Pola for three months of repairs.

After returning to service in August, U-22 operated out of Catttaro, patrolling off the Montenegrin coast over the next two months. On 17 October, the boat returned to Cattaro, where she remained until the war's end. She was ceded to France as a war reparation and scrapped in 1920. Like all of her sister boats, U-22 had no wartime successes.

== Bibliography ==
- Gardiner, Robert; Gray, Randal, eds. (1985). Conway's All the World's Fighting Ships 1906–1921. Annapolis, Maryland: Naval Institute Press. ISBN 978-0-87021-907-8. OCLC 12119866.
- Gibson, R. H.; Prendergast, Maurice (2003) [1931]. The German Submarine War, 1914–1918. Annapolis, Maryland: Naval Institute Press. ISBN 978-1-59114-314-7. OCLC 52924732.
- Halpern, Paul G. (1994). A Naval History of World War I. Annapolis, Maryland: Naval Institute Press. ISBN 978-0-87021-266-6. OCLC 28411665.
