= SM U-12 (Austria-Hungary) =

Austro-Hungarian Navy's U-5-class submarine

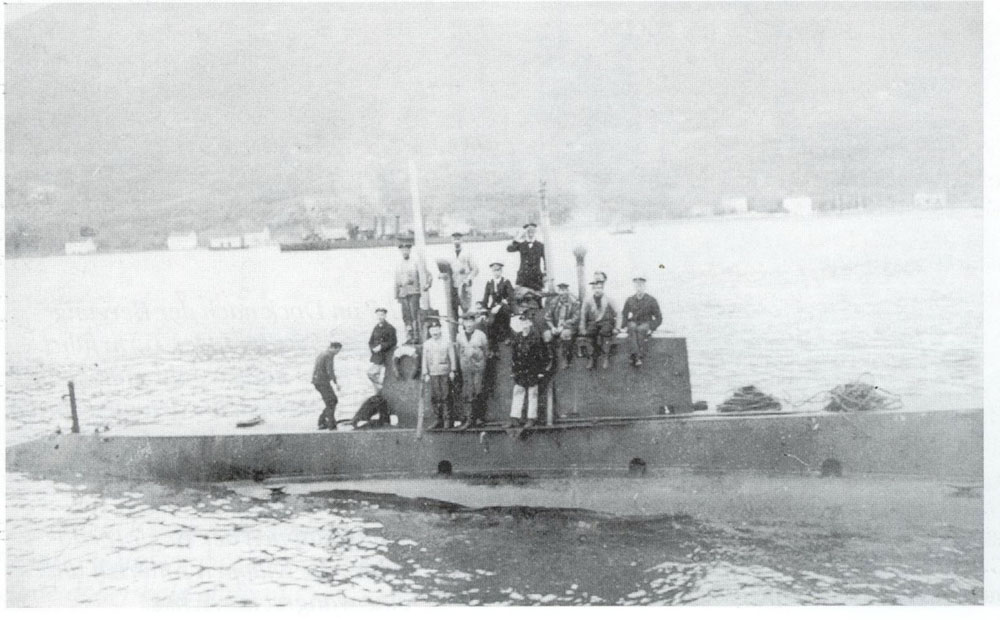
- U-12 entering Pola Harbor in 1914

History

Austria-Hungary
- Name: SM U-12
- Builder: Whitehead & Co., Fiume
- Laid down: 1909
- Launched: 14 March 1911 as SS-3
- Acquired: August 1914
- Commissioned: 21 August 1914
- Fate: Sunk by mine, 12 August 1915, raised and scrapped late 1916

Service record
- Commanders: Egon Lerch; 21 August 1914 – 12 August 1915
- Victories: 1 merchant ship sunk (1,065 GRT); 1 warship damaged (22,189 tons); 6 merchant ships taken as prize (6 GRT + Unknown GRT)

General characteristics
- Class & type: U-5-class submarine
- Displacement: 240 t surfaced; 273 t submerged
- Length: 105 ft 4 in (32.11 m)
- Beam: 13 ft 9 in (4.19 m)
- Draft: 12 ft 10 in (3.91 m)
- Propulsion: 2 × shafts; 2 × 6-cylinder gasoline engines, 600 bhp (450 kW) total; 2 × electric motors, 230 shp (170 kW) total
- Speed: 10.75 knots (19.91 km/h) surfaced; 8.5 knots (15.7 km/h) submerged
- Range: 800 nmi (1,500 km) at 8.5 knots (15.7 km/h) surfaced; 48 nmi (89 km) at 6 knots (11.1 km/h) submerged
- Complement: 19
- Armament: 2 × 45 cm (17.7 in) torpedo tubes (both in front); 4 torpedoes

SM U-12 or U-XII was a U-5-class submarine or U-boat built for and operated by the Austro-Hungarian Navy before and during the First World War.

Built on speculation by Whitehead & Co. of Fiume, the submarine was launched as SS-3 in March 1911 and featured improvements in the electrical and mechanical systems from the design by the American John Philip Holland, to which her older sister boats, SM U-5 and U-6, had been built.

SS-3 was laid down in 1909. The double-hulled submarine was just over 105 feet (32 m) long and displaced between 240 and 273 tonnes (265 and 301 short tons), depending on whether surfaced or submerged. Whitehead tried selling SS-3 to several different navies, but she was bought by the Austro-Hungarian Navy after the outbreak of World War I, despite having been rejected by them twice before. She was commissioned as U-12 in August 1914.

The submarine sank only one ship, a Greek cargo ship in May 1915, but she had earlier captured six Montenegrin sailing vessels as prizes in March. U-12 also damaged, but did not sink, the French battleship Jean Bart in December 1914. While searching for targets in the vicinity of Venice in August 1915, U-12 struck a mine that blew her stern off, and sank with all hands, becoming the first Austro-Hungarian submarine sunk in the war. Her wreck was salvaged the next year by the Italians, who interred U-12's crewmen in a Venetian cemetery.

== Design and construction ==
SS-3 was built on speculation (Note: "Built on speculation" means that Whitehead & Co. built her without a specific customer in mind.) by Whitehead & Co. of Fiume. Her design was based on the John Philip Holland design licensed by Whitehead for U-5 and U-6, two submarines ordered by the Austro-Hungarian Navy and built 1907–1910, and featured improvements in the mechanical and electrical systems. SS-3 was laid down in 1909 and launched at Fiume on 14 March 1911.

SS-3's featured a single-hull with a tear-drop shaped body that bore a strong resemblance to modern nuclear submarines. She was 105 feet 4 inches (32.11 m) long by 13 feet 9 inches (4.19 m) abeam and had a draft of 12 feet 10 inches (3.91 m). She displaced 240 tonnes (260 short tons) surfaced, and 273 tonnes (301 short tons) submerged. Her two 45-centimeter (17.7 in) bow torpedo tubes featured unique, cloverleaf-shaped design hatches that rotated on a central axis, and the boat was designed to carry up to four torpedoes.

According to one source, SS-3 was initially propelled by a pair of electric motors for surface running, but had them replaced with twin 6-cylinder gasoline engines of 300 brake horsepower (220 kW) each when they proved disappointing during trials. (Note: These engines were more powerful than those in the other U-5-class boats, which were 250 brake horsepower (190 kW) each. See Gibson and Prendergast, p. 384.) It is not specifically reported for U-12, but the other U-5-class boats both suffered from inadequate ventilation, which resulted in frequent intoxication of the crew from the engine exhaust. SS-3's underwater propulsion was by two electric motors that totaled 230 shaft horsepower (170 kW).

== Career ==
After SS-3's March 1911 launch, Whitehead tried to sell SS-3 to the Austro-Hungarian Navy, but because the evaluation of the first two U-5-class boats was still underway, they declined to purchase. Over the next three years Whitehead attempted to sell the boat to the navies of Peru, Portugal, the Netherlands, Brazil, and Bulgaria, before the Austro-Hungarian Navy rejected an offer for the second time. With the outbreak of war, however, the Austro-Hungarian Navy purchased the unsold submarine to quickly bolster its fleet. Although provisionally assigned the designation U-7, the submarine was commissioned as SM U-12 on 21 August 1914, with Linienschiffsleutnant Egon Lerch in command. U-12's activities over the early part of the war are not reported, but the boat's armament was augmented by a 3.7 cm (1.5 in)/23 quick-firing (QF) deck gun in November 1914. Sister boat U-5 had her first radio receiver installed at the same time her deck gun was added, but it is not reported whether U-12 did as well.

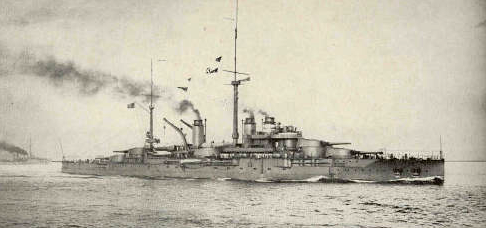
Jean Bart was torpedoed by U-12 in December 1914, but the crew of the French battleship was able to keep her afloat.

On 21 December 1914, Lerch and U-12 chanced upon the French dreadnought Jean Bart in the Straits of Otranto steaming at a leisurely 9 knots (17 km/h; 10 mph) and unprotected by escort ships. U-12 hit French Admiral Lapeyrère's flagship with a single torpedo in the bow, destroying the battleship's wine storeroom but sparing her forward magazine. Jean Bart's watertight compartments saved the ship, which made her way to Malta to undergo repairs at the British dockyards there.

U-12 survived an attack from an unknown French Brumaire-class submarine on 27 February 1915. U-12's next success was the capture of two Montenegrin schooners on 22 March 1916, Fiore Di Dulcigno and Hilussie. Nine days later the U-boat captured another four Montenegrin boats, Buona Forte, Fiore I, Hailie, and Indaverdi. On 29 May, she sank the Greek steamer Virginia, which was the only ship reported sunk by U-12. In June, U-12 underwent a refit that added an additional two torpedo tubes on her forward casing.

In early August, Lerch and U-12 set out from Pola for Venice to look for enemy ships to sink. On 6 August, the Italian destroyer Rosolino Pilo rammed U-12, probably by chance, at about 05:00 in the Lido inlet of the Venetian Lagoon. Two days later, when Italian workers were dredging to try to determine the object Rosolino Pilo had hit, they heard a heavy explosion. When divers went down in the area, they discovered the wreck of U-12 with her stern blown off. U-12's entire complement of 17 men was lost when she went down. (Note: Grant (p. 162) and Kemp (p. 14) report U-12's loss in detail and give the date of her loss as 8 August 1915. Sieche (p. 23) gives the date as four days later, on 12 August.) U-12 was the first Austro-Hungarian submarine sunk during the war.

In late 1916, the Italians salvaged the hulk of U-12 and transported it to Venice. The bodies of U-12's crew were interred at the San Michele cemetery in Venice, and U-12's hulk, of no salvage value, was scrapped at the Venice naval arsenal. In her military service, U-12 sank one ship of 1,065 GRT, damaged one warship (22,189 tons), and captured six ships as prizes.

== Summary of raiding history ==
Date	Name	Nationality	Tonnage (Note: Merchant ship tonnages are in gross register tons. Military vessels are listed by tons displacement.)	Fate
21 December 1914	Jean Bart	French Navy	22,189	Damaged
22 March 1915	Fiore Di Dulcigno	Kingdom of Montenegro	3	Captured as prize
22 March 1915	Hilussie	Kingdom of Montenegro	3	Captured as prize
31 March 1915	Buona Forte	Kingdom of Montenegro	—N/a	Captured as prize
31 March 1915	Fiore I	Kingdom of Montenegro	—N/a	Captured as prize
31 March 1915	Hailie	Kingdom of Montenegro	—N/a	Captured as prize
31 March 1915	Indaverdi	Kingdom of Montenegro	—N/a	Captured as prize
29 May 1915	Virginia	Greece	1,065	Sunk

== Gallery ==
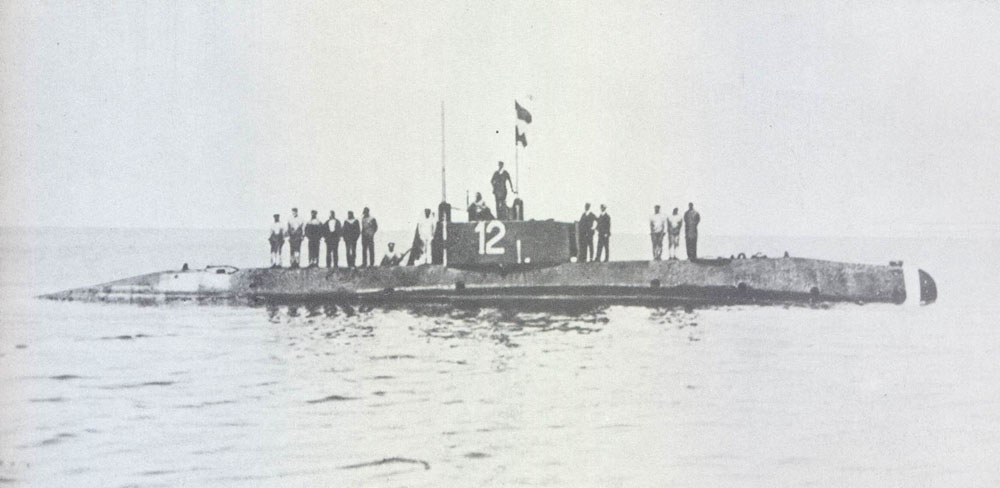

Entering Pola harbor

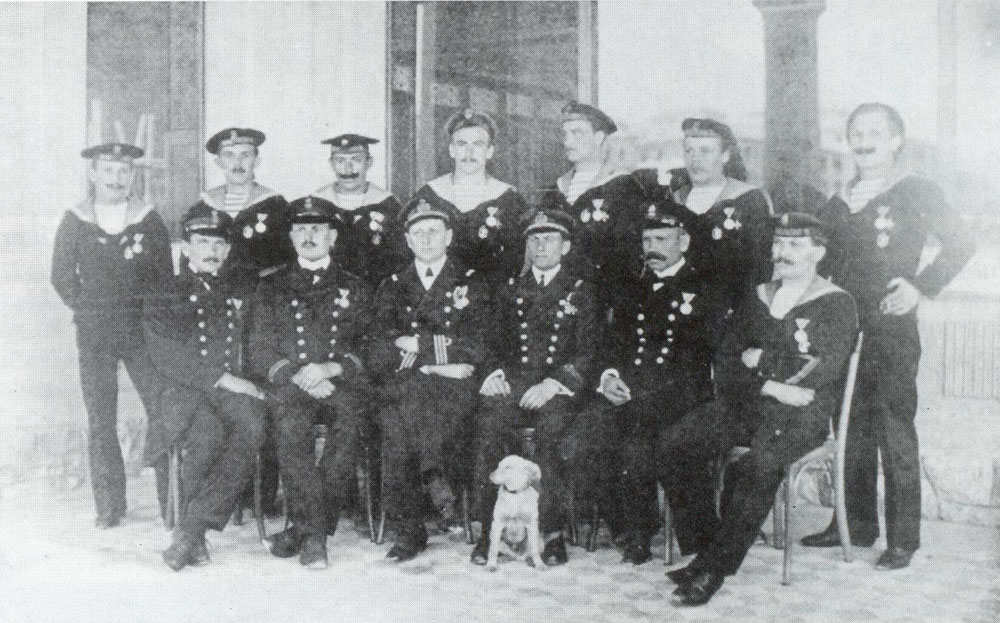
Crew with medals after the Jean Bart attack

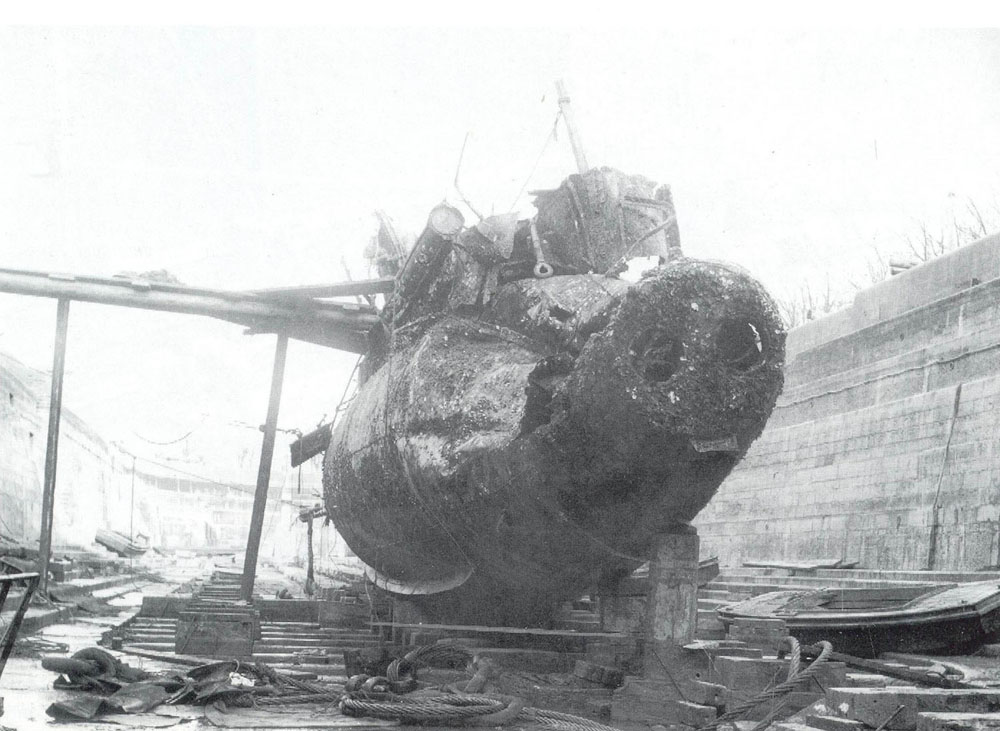
SM U-12 in Italian dock with heavy damage

== Bibliography ==
- Gardiner, Robert, ed. (1985). Conway's All the World's Fighting Ships 1906–1921. Annapolis, Maryland: Naval Institute Press. ISBN 978-0-87021-907-8. OCLC 12119866.
- Gibson, R. H. & Prendergast, Maurice (2003) [1931]. The German Submarine War, 1914–1918. Annapolis, Maryland: Naval Institute Press. ISBN 978-1-59114-314-7. OCLC 52924732.
- Grant, Robert M. (2002) [1964]. U-boats Destroyed: The Effect of Anti-submarine Warfare, 1914–1918. Penzance: Periscope. ISBN 978-1-904381-00-6. OCLC 50215640.
- Halpern, Paul G. (1994). A Naval History of World War I. Annapolis, Maryland: Naval Institute Press. ISBN 978-1-55750-352-7. OCLC 57447525.
- Kemp, Paul (1999). U-boats Destroyed: German Submarine Losses in the World Wars. London: Arms & Armour. ISBN 978-1-85409-515-2. OCLC 43972253.
- Sieche, Erwin F. (1980). "Austro-Hungarian Submarines". Warship, Volume 2. Naval Institute Press. ISBN 978-0-87021-976-4. OCLC 233144055.
- von Trapp, Georg (2007) [1935]. To the Last Salute: Memories of an Austrian U-Boat Commander. Lincoln: University of Nebraska Press. ISBN 978-0-8032-4667-6. OCLC 70866865.
