= U-5-class submarine =

Austro-Hungarian Navy submarines during WWI

- U-5, the lead boat of the U-5 class, as seen in a pre-war postcard

Class overview
- Builders: Whitehead & Co., Fiume
- Operators: Austro-Hungarian Navy
- Preceded by: U-3 class
- Succeeded by: U-7 class
- Built: 1909–1911
- In commission: 1910–1918
- Completed: 3
- Lost: 2
- Preserved: 0

General characteristics
- Type: submarine
- Displacement: 240 t (240 long tons) surfaced; 273 t (269 long tons) submerged
- Length: 105 ft 4 in (32.11 m)
- Beam: 13 ft 9 in (4.19 m)
- Draft: 12 ft 10 in (3.91 m)
- Propulsion: 2 × shafts; 2 × 6-cylinder gasoline engines, 500 bhp (370 kW) total; 2 × electric motors, 230 shp (170 kW) total
- Speed: 10.75 knots (19.91 km/h) surfaced; 8.5 knots (15.7 km/h) submerged
- Range: 800 nmi (1,500 km) @ 8.5 knots (15.7 km/h) surfaced; 48 nmi (89 km) @ 6 knots (11.1 km/h) submerged
- Complement: 19
- Armament: 2 × 45 cm (17.7 in) torpedo tubes (both in front); 4 torpedoes

The U-5 class was a class of three submarines or U-boats that were operated by the Austro-Hungarian Navy (German: Kaiserliche und Königliche Kriegsmarine or K.u.K. Kriegsmarine) before and during World War I. The class was a part of the Austro-Hungarian Navy's efforts to competitively evaluate three foreign submarine designs.

The design of the boats was based upon the Electric Boat Company's EB-17 (C-class), the first to be designed by the company's new chief designer, Lawrence York Spear. It featured a single, teardrop hull, which resembled the design of modern nuclear submarines. The class members were just over 105 feet (32 m) long and displaced 240 tonnes (240 long tons) surfaced and 273 tonnes (269 long tons) submerged. All were originally equipped with two bow torpedo tubes and could carry four torpedoes. The first two boats, U-5 and U-6, built specifically for the Austro-Hungarian Navy, to the same design as the United States C-class submarine were partially constructed in the United States and completed at Whitehead & Co. at Fiume. The third was completely constructed by Whitehead's at Fiume and purchased by Austria-Hungary to bolster their U-boat fleet after the outbreak of World War I.

All three boats had successes during World War I; between them they sank five ships with a combined tonnage of 22,391. In addition they captured seven ships as prizes and damaged Jean Bart, a French dreadnought of 22,189 tons displacement. All three boats were sunk during the war, though U-5, the lead boat of the class, was raised and recommissioned after her sinking. After the war's end, U-5, the only survivor of the class, was ceded to Italy as a war reparation and was broken up in 1920.

== Design and construction ==
In 1904, after allowing the navies of other countries to pioneer submarine developments, the Austro-Hungarian Navy ordered the Austrian Naval Technical Committee (MTK) to produce a submarine design. The January 1905 design developed by the MTK and other designs submitted by the public as part of a design competition were all rejected by the Navy as impracticable. They instead opted to order two submarines each of designs by Simon Lake, Germaniawerft, and Electric Boat for a competitive evaluation. The two Electric Boat submarines comprised the U-5 class. (Note: The Lake design became the U-1 class while the Germaniawerft design became the U-3 class.) The Navy authorized two boats, U-5 and U-6, from Whitehead & Co. of Fiume in 1906.

The U-5 class was built to the same design as the C class for the US Navy and was built by Robert Whitehead's firm of Whitehead & Co. under license from Electric Boat. Components for the first two Austrian boats were manufactured by the Electric Boat Company and assembled at Fiume, while the third boat was a speculative private venture by Whitehead that failed to find a buyer and was purchased by Austria-Hungary upon the outbreak of World War I.

The U-5-class boats had a single-hulled design with a teardrop-shape that bore a strong resemblance to modern nuclear submarines. The boats were just over 105 feet (32 m) long and displaced 240 tonnes (240 long tons) surfaced, and 273 tonnes (269 long tons) submerged. The torpedo tubes featured unique, cloverleaf-shaped design hatches that rotated on a central axis. The ships were powered by twin 6-cylinder gasoline engines while surfaced, but suffered from inadequate ventilation which resulted in frequent intoxication of the crew. While submerged, they were propelled by twin electric motors.

The first two boats, U-5 and U-6, were ordered by the Austro-Hungarian Navy for evaluation and were partially assembled in the United States, shipped to Fiume, and riveted together by Whitehead & Co., which, author Edwin Sieche reports, "caused a lot of trouble". U-5 was launched in February 1909 and was followed in June by the launch of U-6. Both boats were commissioned by April 1910.

The third boat, originally named SS-3, was built on speculation entirely at Whitehead's in Fiume. The boat's design featured improvements in the electrical and mechanical systems. Gibson and Prendergast report that, when built, SS-3 was powered by electric motors for both surface and submerged running. When the surface performance of the electric motors proved disappointing in trials, SS-3's power-plant was rebuilt to match the gasoline/electric combination used in U-5 and U-6. SS-3 was launched in March 1911 and was offered to the Austro-Hungarian Navy, but because the evaluation of the first two U-5-class boats was still underway, they declined to purchase.

As built, the U-5-class boats were armed with two 45-centimeter (17.7 in) bow torpedo tubes and could carry a supply of four torpedoes. By 1915, all had received a 3.7 cm/23 (1.5 in) deck gun.

== Service career ==
U-5 and U-6 were both commissioned into the Austro-Hungarian Navy by April 1910, and served as training boats through 1914, making as many as ten training cruises per month. During their early years, each boat was demonstrated to a foreign naval delegation; U-5 to a Peruvian detachment in 1911, U-6 to a Norwegian group in 1910. At the beginning of World War I in August 1914, U-5 and U-6 comprised half of the operational U-boat fleet of the Austro-Hungarian Navy.

In the three years after SS-3's March 1911 launch, Whitehead's attempted to sell the boat to the navies of Peru, Portugal, the Netherlands, Brazil, and Bulgaria, before the Austro-Hungarian Navy rejected an offer for the second time. With the outbreak of war, however, the Austro-Hungarian Navy purchased the unsold submarine to quickly bolster its fleet. Although provisionally commissioned as U-7, she was commissioned as U-12 in August 1914.

By late December 1914, all three of the U-5-class boats were based at the naval base at Cattaro and all took part in combat patrols. Between the three boats, they sank five ships with a combined tonnage of 22,391, (Note: Merchant ship tonnage is in gross register tons. Warship tonnage is in tons of displacement.) captured seven ships, and damaged one dreadnought. U-6 was the least successful, sinking a single ship of 756 tons; U-5 was the most successful, sinking three ships with of a combined tonnage of 20,570, including the French armoured cruiser Léon Gambetta. U-12 damaged, but did not sink, the largest ship torpedoed by any of the U-5 class when she hit the French battleship Jean Bart on 21 December 1914.

Of the three boats of the class, only U-5 survived the war intact. U-12 was sunk with the loss of all hands when she hit a mine near Venice in August 1915, (Note: Grant (p. 162), Gibson and Prendergast (p. 73), and Halpern (p. 150) report U-12's loss in August 1915, while Sieche (p. 23) and Gardiner (p. 343) report the loss in August 1916.) while U-6 was scuttled by her crew in May 1916 after becoming trapped in an anti-submarine net that was a part of the Otranto Barrage. U-5 herself sank after hitting an Austro-Hungarian mine during a training exercise, but was raised, repaired and recommissioned before the war's end. U-5 was ceded to Italy as a war reparation and scrapped in 1920.

== Class members ==
U-5 sank the French cruiser Léon Gambetta in April 1915 with heavy loss of life.

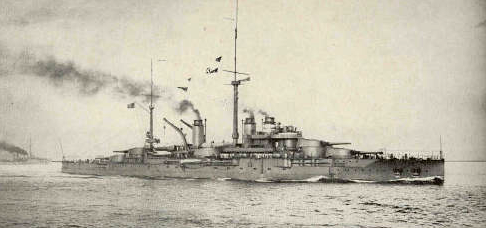
Jean Bart was torpedoed by U-12 in December 1914, but the crew of the French battleship was able to keep the ship afloat.

=== SM U-5 ===
SM U-5 was laid down in April 1907 and launched in February 1909. She was commissioned into the Austro-Hungarian Navy in April 1910, and served as a training boat—sometimes making as many as ten cruises a month—through the beginning of the First World War in 1914. The submarine scored most of her wartime successes during the first year of the war while under the command of Georg Ritter von Trapp. The French armoured cruiser Léon Gambetta, sunk in April 1915, was the largest ship sunk by U-5. In May 1917, U-5 hit a mine and sank with the loss of six men. She was raised, rebuilt, and recommissioned, but sank no more ships. At the end of the war, U-5 was ceded to Italy as a war reparation, and scrapped in 1920. In all, U-5 sank three ships totaling 20,570 combined tonnage.

=== SM U-6 ===
SM U-6 was laid down in February 1908 and launched the following June. She served as a training boat after her July 1910 commissioning into the Austro-Hungarian Navy. She served in that capacity through the beginning of World War I in 1914, making as many as ten training cruises a month. U-6 scored only one wartime success, sinking a French destroyer in March 1916. In May that same year, she became entangled in anti-submarine netting deployed as part of the Otranto Barrage. Coming under fire from drifters running the nets, U-6 was abandoned and sunk. All of her crewmen were rescued and were held in captivity through the end of the war.

=== SM U-12 ===
SM U-12 was built on speculation by Whitehead & Co. of Fiume under the name SS-3. She was laid down in 1909 and launched in March 1911 and featured improvements in the electrical and mechanical systems from the Holland design of her older sister boats, U-5 and U-6. Whitehead's tried selling SS-3 to several different navies, but she was finally bought by the Austro-Hungarian Navy after the outbreak of World War I, despite having been rejected twice before. She was commissioned as U-12 in August 1914. She sank only one ship during the war, a Greek cargo ship in May 1915, but had earlier captured six Montenegrin sailing vessels as prizes in March. U-12 also damaged, but did not sink, the French battleship Jean Bart in December 1914. While searching for targets in the vicinity of Venice in August 1915, U-12 struck a mine that blew her stern off, and sank with all hands, becoming the first Austro-Hungarian submarine sunk in the war. Her wreck was salvaged the next year by the Italians, who interred the bodies of U-12's crewmen in a Venetian cemetery.

== Bibliography ==
- Friedman, Norman, ed. (1995). U.S. Submarines Through 1945: An Illustrated Design History. Annapolis, Maryland: Naval Institute Press. ISBN 1-55750-263-3. OCLC 98765432.
- Gardiner, Robert, ed. (1985). Conway's All the World's Fighting Ships 1906–1921. Annapolis, Maryland: Naval Institute Press. ISBN 978-0-87021-907-8. OCLC 12119866.
- Gibson, R. H.; Prendergast, M. (2003) [1931]. The German Submarine War, 1914–1918. Annapolis, Maryland: Naval Institute Press. ISBN 978-1-59114-314-7. OCLC 52924732.
- Grant, Robert M. (2002) [1964]. U-boats Destroyed: The Effect of Anti-submarine Warfare, 1914–1918. Penzance: Periscope. ISBN 978-1-904381-00-6. OCLC 50215640.
- Halpern, Paul G. (1994). A Naval History of World War I. Annapolis, Maryland: Naval Institute Press. ISBN 978-1-55750-352-7. OCLC 57447525.
- Sieche, Erwin F. (1980). "Austro-Hungarian Submarines". Warship, Volume 2. Naval Institute Press. ISBN 978-0-87021-976-4. OCLC 233144055.
