= U-3-class submarine =

Austro-Hungarian Navy submarine class during WWI

- Both members of the U-3 class, SM U-3 (front) and SM U-4 (right rear), are seen here in this undated photograph.

Class overview
- Builders: Friedrich Krupp Germaniawerft
- Operators: Austro-Hungarian Navy
- Preceded by: U-1 class
- Succeeded by: U-5 class
- Built: 1907–09
- In commission: 1909–1918
- Completed: 2
- Lost: 1
- Preserved: 0

General characteristics
- Type: submarine
- Displacement: 240 t surfaced; 300 t submerged
- Length: 138 ft 9 in (42.29 m)
- Beam: 14 ft (4.3 m)
- Draft: 12 ft 6 in (3.81 m)
- Propulsion: 2 × shafts; 2 × kerosene 4-cylinder two-stroke engines, 600 bhp (450 kW) total; 2 × electric motors, 320 shp (240 kW) total
- Speed: 12 knots (22 km/h) surfaced; 8.5 knots (15.7 km/h) submerged
- Range: 1,200 nmi (2,200 km) at 12 knots (22 km/h), surfaced; 40 nmi (74 km) at 3 knots (5.6 km/h), submerged
- Complement: 21
- Armament: 2 × 45 cm (17.7 in) torpedo tubes (both front); 3 torpedoes

The U-3 class was a class of two submarines or U-boats built for and operated by the Austro-Hungarian Navy (German: Kaiserliche und Königliche Kriegsmarine or K.u.K. Kriegsmarine). The U-3-class boats were designed and built by Germaniawerft of Kiel, Germany. The class was a part of the Austro-Hungarian Navy's efforts to competitively evaluate three foreign submarine designs.

The two U-3-class boats, both launched in 1908, were just under 140 feet (43 m) long and were each powered by two kerosene 4-cylinder two-stroke engines while surfaced, and two electric motors when submerged. The U-3 class initially had diving problems that were alleviated after several modifications to fins and diving planes. Both boats of the class served in combat during World War I. U-3, the lead boat of the class, was sunk by gunfire in August 1915. U-4 was the longest-serving Austro-Hungarian submarine and sank 14,928 gross register tons (GRT) and 7,345 tons of ships, including the Italian armored cruiser Giuseppe Garibaldi in July 1915. U-4 was handed over to France as a war reparation in 1920 and scrapped.

== Design and construction ==
In 1904, after allowing the navies of other countries to pioneer submarine developments, the Austro-Hungarian Navy ordered the Austrian Naval Technical Committee (MTK) to produce a submarine design. The January 1905 design developed by the MTK and other designs submitted by the public as part of a design competition were all rejected by the Navy as impracticable. They instead opted to order two submarines each of designs by Simon Lake, Germaniawerft, and John Philip Holland for a competitive evaluation. The two Germaniawerft submarines comprised the U-3 class. (Note: The Lake design became the U-1 class while the Holland design became the U-5 class.) The Navy authorized two boats, U-3 and U-4, from the Germaniawerft in 1906.

The U-3 class was an improved version of Germaniawerft's design for the Imperial German Navy's first U-boat, U-1, and featured a double hull with internal saddle tanks. The Germaniawerft engineers refined the design's hull shape through extensive model trials. The boats were 138 feet 9 inches (42 m) long by 14 feet (4.3 m) abeam and had a draft of 12 feet 6 inches (3.81 m). Each boat displaced 240 tonnes (260 short tons) surfaced and 300 tonnes (330 short tons) submerged. Each submarine had two bow 45-centimeter (17.7 in) torpedo tubes, and was designed to carry up to three torpedoes.

U-3 and U-4 were both laid down on 12 March 1907 at Germaniawerft in Kiel and were launched in August and November 1908, respectively. (Note: In their book The German Submarine War, 1914–1918, R. H. Gibson and Maurice Prendergast report that both boats were launched in 1909 (p. 384).) After completion, each was towed to Pola via Gibraltar, with U-3 arriving in January 1909 and U-4 arriving in April.

== Service career ==
Both boats were commissioned into the Austro-Hungarian Navy in 1909, with U-4 commissioned in August and U-3 in September. During the evaluations conducted by the Navy, the U-3 design bested the U-1 (Lake) and U-5 (Holland) classes in reliability and provided the best living conditions. They did, however, have the worst diving abilities of the three designs, and produced excessive exhaust smoke. (Note: The results of the evaluation led the Austro-Hungarian Navy to order five new U-boats from Germaniawerft as the U-7 class.) To remedy the diving problems of the U-3-class, the fins were changed in size and shape several times. Eventually the front diving planes were removed and a stationary stern flap was affixed to the hull.

From their commissioning to the outbreak of World War I 1914, both U-3-class submarines served as training boats and sailed on as many as ten cruises a month in that capacity. At the beginning of the war, the U-3 boats made up half of the operational U-boats in the Austro-Hungarian Navy fleet. The armament of each boat was supplemented by the addition of a 3.7-centimeter (1.5 in) quick firing (QF) deck gun. Both boats conducted reconnaissance cruises for a large part of the first year of the war. In August 1915, U-3 was sunk by a French destroyer after making an unsuccessful torpedo attack on an Italian armed merchant cruiser. U-4 went on to become the longest serving Austro-Hungarian submarine, sinking twelve ships that totaled 14,928 gross register tons (GRT), 7,345 tons and damaging a British Royal Navy cruiser.

== Class members ==
=== SM U-3 ===
SM U-3 was laid down on 12 March 1907 at Germaniawerft in Kiel (work no. 135) and launched on 20 August 1908. Upon completion, she was towed via Gibraltar to Pola, where she arrived on 24 January 1909. She was commissioned into the Austro-Hungarian Navy on 12 September, and served as a training vessel through the beginning of World War I. For most of the first year of the war, she conducted reconnaissance cruises from Cattaro. On 12 August 1915, U-3 made an unsuccessful torpedo attack on the Italian armed merchant cruiser Citta di Catania in the northern end of the Strait of Otranto and was rammed and damaged by the Italian ship in return. U-3 succumbed to gunfire from the French destroyer Bisson the following day, with the loss of seven crewmen, including Linienschiffsleutnant Karl Strnad, her commanding officer; the other fourteen men of the crew were captured.

=== SM U-4 ===
SM U-4 was laid down in March 1907 at Germaniawerft in Kiel (work no. 136) and launched in November 1908. Upon completion, she was towed via Gibraltar to Pola, where she arrived in January 1909. She was commissioned into the Austro-Hungarian Navy in August, and served as a training vessel through the beginning of World War I.

Over the first year of the war, U-4 made several unsuccessful attacks on warships and captured several smaller vessels as prizes. In July 1915, she scored what Conway's All the World's Fighting Ships 1906–1921 called her greatest success when she torpedoed and sank the Italian armored cruiser Giuseppe Garibaldi, the largest ship hit by U-4 during the war. In mid-May 1917, U-4 was a participant in a raid on the Otranto Barrage which precipitated the Battle of Otranto Straits. In a separate action that same month, U-4 sank her second largest ship, the Italian troopship Perseo. She scored her final success in July 1917 with the sinking of a French tug. In total, U-4 sank fifteen ships totaling 14,928 gross register tons (GRT) and 7,345 tons. She survived the war as Austria-Hungary's longest serving submarine, was ceded to France as a war reparation, and scrapped in 1920.

== Bibliography ==
- Baumgartner, Lothar; Sieche, Erwin (1999). Die Schiffe der k.(u.)k. Kriegsmarine im Bild=Austro-Hungarian warships in photographs (in German). Wien: Verlagsbuchhandlung Stöhr. ISBN 978-3-901208-25-6. OCLC 43596931.
- Gardiner, Robert, ed. (1985). Conway's All the World's Fighting Ships 1906–1921. Annapolis, Maryland: Naval Institute Press. ISBN 978-0-87021-907-8. OCLC 12119866.
- Gibson, R. H.; Prendergast, Maurice (2003) [1931]. The German Submarine War, 1914–1918. Annapolis, Maryland: Naval Institute Press. ISBN 978-1-59114-314-7. OCLC 52924732.
- Sieche, Erwin F. (1980). "Austro-Hungarian Submarines". Warship, Volume 2. Naval Institute Press. ISBN 978-0-87021-976-4. OCLC 233144055.
