= SM U-21 (Austria-Hungary) =

Austro-Hungarian Navy's U-20-class submarine

- SM U-21 loads a torpedo during World War I.

History

Austria-Hungary
- Name: SM U-21
- Ordered: 27 March 1915
- Builder: Pola Navy Yard, Pola
- Laid down: Mid 1915
- Launched: 15 August 1916
- Commissioned: 15 August 1917
- Fate: Ceded to Italy, scrapped 1920

Service record
- Commanders: Josef Holub; 29 June 1916 – 24 February 1917; Reichsfreiherr Hugo von Seyffertitz; 15 August 1917 – 24 March 1918; Robert Dürrigl; 24 March – 28 August 1918; Ladislaus Csicsery von Csicser; 28 August – 31 October 1918
- Victories: None

General characteristics
- Type: U-20-class submarine
- Displacement: 173 t (170 long tons), surfaced; 210 t (210 long tons), submerged
- Length: 127 ft 2 in (38.76 m)
- Beam: 13 ft (4.0 m)
- Draft: 9 ft (2.7 m)
- Propulsion: 1 × shaft; 1 × diesel engine, 450 bhp (340 kW); 1 × electric motor, 160 shp (120 kW)
- Speed: 12 knots (22 km/h) surfaced; 9 knots (17 km/h) submerged
- Range: 1,400 nautical miles (2,600 km) at 10 knots (19 km/h) surfaced; 23 nautical miles (43 km) at 8 knots (15 km/h) submerged
- Complement: 18
- Armament: 2 × 45 cm (17.7 in) torpedo tubes (both in front); 2 torpedoes; 1 × 66 mm (2.6 in) deck gun; 1 × 8 mm (0.31 in) machine gun

SM U-21 or U-XXI was a U-20-class submarine or U-boat built for and operated by the Austro-Hungarian Navy (German: Kaiserliche und Königliche Kriegsmarine or K.u.K. Kriegsmarine) during the First World War. The design for U-21 was based on submarines of the Royal Danish Navy's Havmanden class (three of which had been built in Austria-Hungary), and was largely obsolete by the beginning of the war.

U-21 was just over 127 feet (39 m) long and was armed with two bow torpedo tubes, a deck gun, and a machine gun. Construction on U-21 began in mid 1915 and the boat was launched in September 1916. After suffering damage during a diving trial in January 1917, U-21 underwent seven months of repairs before her commissioning in August 1917.

The U-boat conducted patrols off the Albanian coast in October 1917, but experienced the failure of the seal on her main hatch. The repairs kept the boat out of action until June 1918. But in July a piston in her diesel engine broke, knocking the submarine out of the rest of the war. At the end of World War I, U-21 was ceded to Italy as a war reparation and scrapped in 1920. U-21 had no wartime successes.

== Design and construction ==
When it became apparent to the Austro-Hungarian Navy that the First World War would not be a short one, they moved to bolster their U-boat fleet by seizing the plans for the Danish Havmanden class submarines, three of which had been built at Whitehead & Co. in Fiume. Although the Austro-Hungarian Navy was not happy with the design, which was largely obsolete, it was the only design for which plans were available and which could be begun immediately in domestic shipyards. The Austro-Hungarian Navy unenthusiastically placed orders for U-21 and her three sister boats on 27 March 1915.

U-21 was one of two boats of the class to be built at the Pola Navy Yard. Due to demands by the Hungarian government, subcontracts for the class were divided between Hungarian and Austrian firms, and this politically expedient solution worsened technical problems with the design, resulting in numerous modifications and delays for the class in general.

U-21 was an ocean-going submarine that displaced 173 metric tons (170 long tons) surfaced and 210 metric tons (207 long tons) submerged and was designed for a complement of 18. She was 127 feet 2 inches (38.76 m) long with a beam of 13 feet (4.0 m) and a draft of 9 feet (2.7 m). For propulsion, she featured a single shaft, a single 450 bhp (340 kW) diesel engine for surface running, and a single 160 shp (120 kW) electric motor for submerged travel. She was capable of 12 knots (22 km/h) while surfaced and 9 knots (17 km/h) while submerged. Although there is no specific notation of a range for U-21, the Havmanden class, upon which the U-20 class was based, had a range of 1,400 nautical miles (2,600 km) at 10 knots (19 km/h), surfaced, and 23 nautical miles (43 km) at 8 knots (15 km/h) submerged.

U-21 was armed with two 45 cm (17.7 in) torpedo tubes located in the front and carried a complement of two torpedoes. She was also equipped with a 66 mm (2.6 in) deck gun and an 8 mm (0.31 in) machine gun.

== Service career ==
U-21 was launched on 15 August 1916, the first of the four U-20-class boats. During a diving trial in January 1917, the submarine was damaged when it sank too deep, requiring repairs that took place over the next seven months. U-21 was commissioned on 15 August under the command of Linienschiffsleutnant Hugo von Seyffertitz. A 31-year-old native of Brixen, von Seyffertitz was a first-time U-boat commander.

Ten days after commissioning, U-21 safely submerged to a depth of 42 metres (138 ft). However, her nose was dented when she hit bottom on another test dive in September, necessitating more repairs. On 29 September, von Seyffertitz steered the boat from the submarine base at Brioni to Cattaro, where she arrived on 1 October. On 4 October, U-21 set out for a patrol off the coast of Albania, but had returned to Cattaro by mid October.

On 15 October, von Seyffertitz and U-21 departed from Cattaro to begin their first Mediterranean deployment. Slated to sail into the Ionian Sea, U-21 instead had to turn back the following day when the main hatch seal on the conning tower leaked and could not be repaired. After her 18 October return to Cattaro, she sailed for Pola, arriving on 24 October. There, she would undergo another lengthy stay in port for repairs. While U-21 was under repair, von Seyffertitz was transferred to U-47.

Linienschiffleutnant Robert Dürrigl was assigned the new commander of U-21 on 24 March 1918. The 26-year-old Galician had served as commander of U-10 for four months in 1917. Dürrial led U-21 out of Pola on 1 June for Cattaro, making stops en route at Arbe and Novigrad for repairs to the gyrocompass.

On 16 July, while conducting patrols off the Albanian coast, a piston in U-21's diesel engine broke and Dürrial put in at Djenovic. On 25 July, U-21 was towed to Pola, where she remained until the end of the war. She was ceded to Italy as a war reparation and scrapped in 1920. Like all of her sister boats, U-21 had no wartime successes.

== Bibliography ==
- Gardiner, Robert; Gray, Randal, eds. (1985). Conway's All the World's Fighting Ships 1906–1921. Annapolis, Maryland: Naval Institute Press. ISBN 978-0-87021-907-8. OCLC 12119866.
- Gibson, R. H.; Prendergast, Maurice (2003) [1931]. The German Submarine War, 1914–1918. Annapolis, Maryland: Naval Institute Press. ISBN 978-1-59114-314-7. OCLC 52924732.
- Halpern, Paul G. (1994). A Naval History of World War I. Annapolis, Maryland: Naval Institute Press. ISBN 978-0-87021-266-6. OCLC 28411665.
