= Whitehead Torpedo Works =

Austro-Hungarian, later Italian, arms manufacturer

Whitehead Torpedo Works was a company established in the 19th century by Robert Whitehead that developed the Whitehead torpedo. It grew from its initial location at Fiume to Wyke Regis and to Livorno, but the former two plants closed by the end of World War II. The Italian branch maintained the name Whitehead for a long time into the late 20th century, and still exists as Leonardo Sistemi di Difesa as of 2024.

== History ==
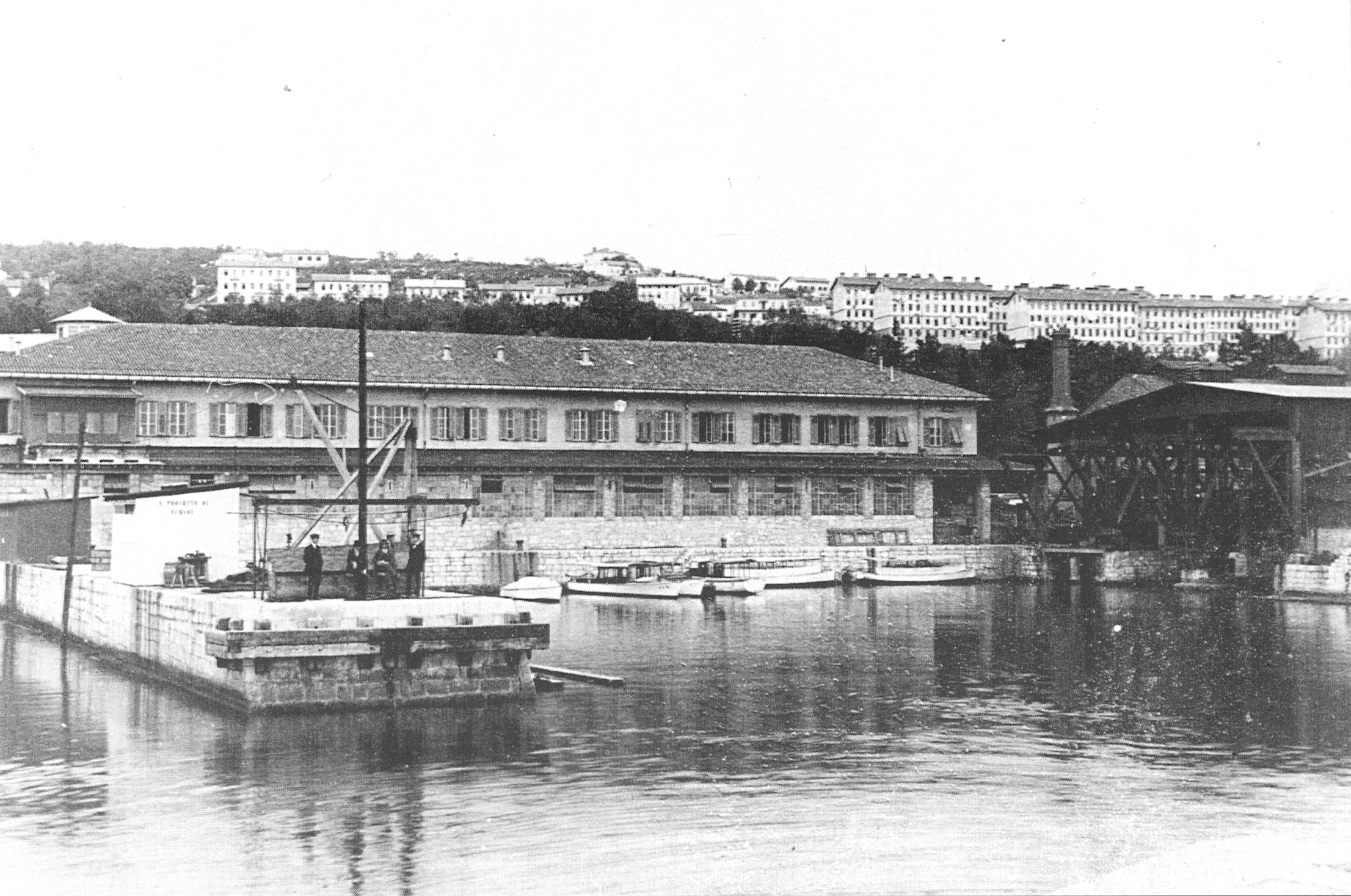
The Torpedo Factory in Fiume in 1910 was located by the Adriatic Sea.

Robert Whitehead worked for a metal foundry in the city of Fiume (today Rijeka, Croatia), and became its manager in 1856, and changed its name to Stabilimento Tecnico di Fiume (STF). STF produced marine steam boilers and engines, including for the Austro-Hungarian Navy. The invention of the self-propelled torpedo happened at that company, but it was not profitable and the company went bankrupt in 1873.

The Whitehead company, Torpedo-Fabrik von Robert Whitehead, was founded in 1875 and would produce for the first torpedoes sold all around the world.

In 1890 Whitehead opened a UK manufacturing and test site in Portland Harbour, Dorset.

In 1905 the factory changed its name to Torpedo Fabrik Whitehead & Co. Gesellschaft and before his death, Whitehead sold his shares package to Vickers Armstrong Whitworth.

In 1915, the company established a submarine subsidiary, the Ungarische Unterseebotsbau AG (known by its acronym UBAG; lit. 'Hungarian Submarine Building Corporation'), in Fiume and Linz. SM U-XX, SM U-XXI, SM U-XXII and SM U-XXIII Type diesel-electric submarines were produced by the UBAG Corporation in Fiume.

The Wyke Regis factory continued to operate as a major anti-submarine and torpedo warfare centre in both the First and Second World Wars. It became Vickers Armstrong, Wellworthys and finally AE Piston Products. The site later became a housing estate.

At the end of World War I the Fiume factory was in economic crisis and in 1924, when the Treaty of Rome was signed and Fiume passed to Italy, Giuseppe Orlando, one of the owners of the Cantiere navale fratelli Orlando of Livorno, purchased the company. Whitehead Torpedo, as it became known then, started producing motorcycles and then torpedoes in their Livorno subsidiary Società Moto Fides.

With the end of World War II the Fiume factory closed and merged with Moto Fides forming the Whitehead Moto Fides Stabilimenti Meccanici Riuniti on 31 July 1945. The Whitehead Moto Fides continued the production of torpedoes in their Italian locations, and was renamed several times since, currently Leonardo Sistemi di Difesa.
