= Siegfried Popper =

Naval architect (1848–1933)

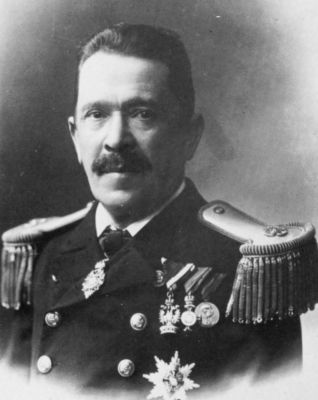
- Born: 5 January 1848; Prague, Bohemia, Austrian Empire
- Died: 19 April 1933 (aged 85); Prague, Czechoslovakia
- Education: Karlsruhe Institute of Technology
- Occupation: Architect
- Practice: Naval architect

Siegfried Popper (5 January 1848, Prague – 19 April 1933, Prague) was a naval architect in late-nineteenth- and early twentieth-century in Austria-Hungary.

== Biography ==
Popper was born in Prague to Joachim Popper, a fine goods dealer (Galanteriewarenhandler) and Anna Schulhof. He attended the Nikolander Realschule (Technical School) before attending the Deutsche Technische Hochschule in Prague for one year. He gained a degree in mechanical engineering after a three-year study at Technische Hochschule Karlsruhe.

== Naval career ==
Popper spent three years at various engineering works in Prague before joining the Austro-Hungarian Navy on 1 December 1869 as a draughtsman. He began working on ship design in 1887, when he prepared plans for the torpedo cruiser Tiger. He rose to the rank of Schiffbau-General-Ingenieur (engineering admiral), a rank which was created for him and which was conferred on 30 April 1904. He was responsible for the design of all the ships of the navy built until his retirement on 1 April 1907. He afterwards worked for the Stabilimento Tecnico Triestino shipbuilding firm.

He was granted an honorary doctorate by Vienna University in 1916 and returned it, about 1930, when the university introduced "Numera Clausa". In 1931 he returned an honorary doctorate from the Technische Hochschule Vienna in protest at anti-semitism among the faculty.

Kaiser Wilhelm II offered him a chair in naval architecture at the Technische Hochschule in Charlottenburg (now Technische Universität Berlin), but Popper declined this offer. By the time he retired, Popper was in poor health. He was hard of hearing and his vision was poor.

== Retirement and death ==
After retirement Popper devoted much of his time to translating Hebrew literature into German. Because of his deafness he was run down by a tram in Prague and died several days later, on 19 April 1933.
