= List of battleships of Austria-Hungary =

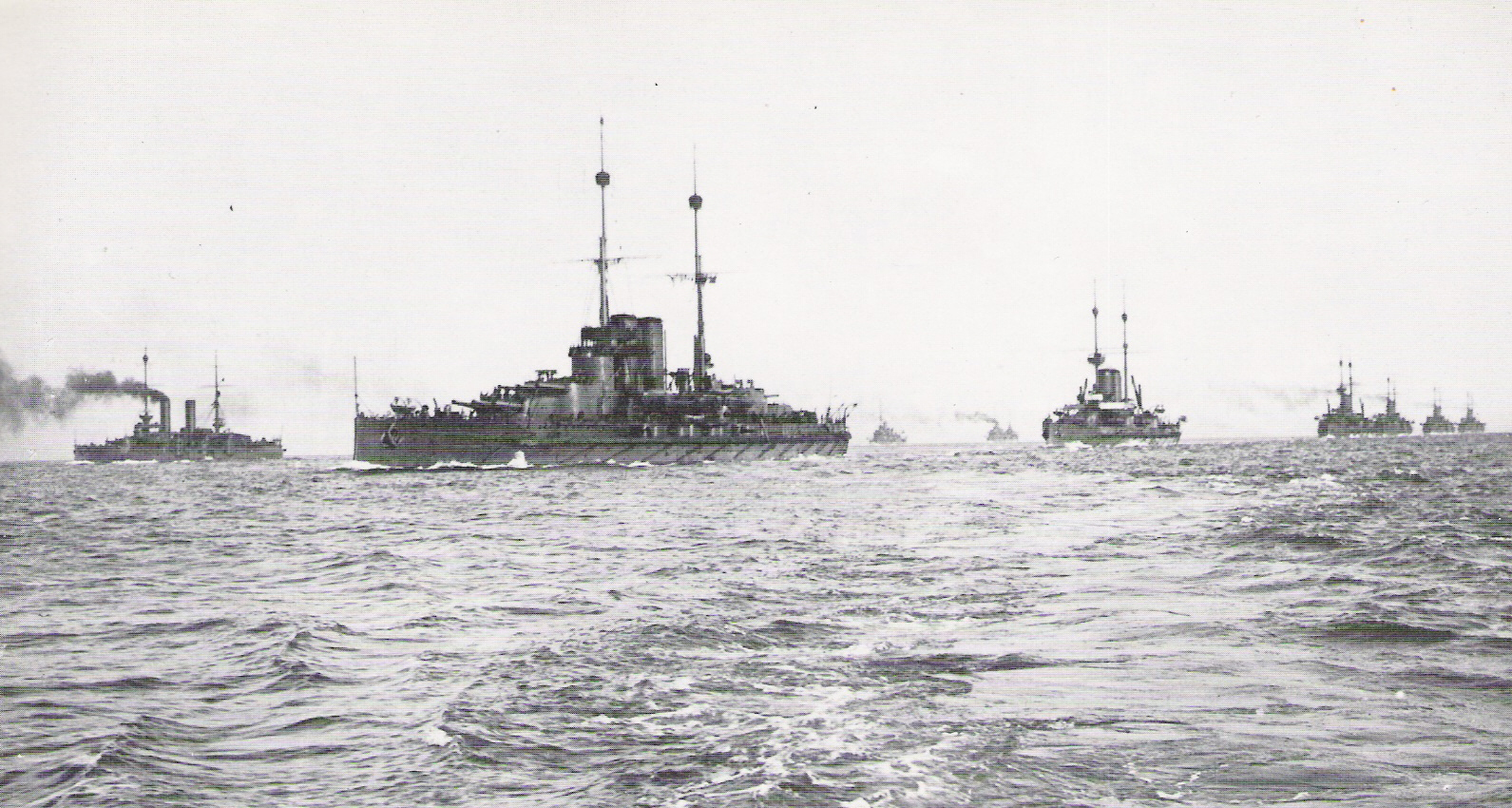
Austro-Hungarian fleet maneuvers before World War I

The Austro-Hungarian Navy (Kaiserliche und Königliche Kriegsmarine, shortened to k.u.k. Kriegsmarine) built a series of battleships between the early 1900s and 1917. To defend its Adriatic coast in wartime, Austria-Hungary had previously built a series of smaller ironclad warships, including coastal defense ships, and armored cruisers. (Note: These included (among others) the Monarch-class coastal defense ships, SMS Kronprinz Erzherzog Rudolf and SMS Kronprinzessin Erzherzogin Stephanie (all only battleships in name and really coastal defense ships), and the armored cruisers SMS Kaiserin und Königin Maria Theresia, SMS Kaiser Karl VI and the SMS Sankt Georg.) The appointment of Admiral Hermann von Spaun to the post of State Secretary of the Navy in 1897 accelerated naval construction and under the command of Franz Joseph I of Austria, the k.u.k. Kriegsmarine began a program of naval expansion at the beginning of the 20th century. The navy immediately pushed for the construction of the three Habsburg-class battleships.

With the establishment of the Austrian Naval League in September 1904 and the appointment of Vice-Admiral Rudolf Montecuccoli to the post of Chief of the Naval Section of the War Ministry in October that same year, the k.u.k. Kriegsmarine began a program of naval expansion and modernization befitting a Great Power. Montecuccoli immediately pursued the efforts championed by his predecessor and pushed to greatly expand and modernize the Austro-Hungarian Navy. By the Spring of 1905, Montecuccoli envisioned a modern Austro-Hungarian Navy of 12 battleships, four armoured cruisers, eight scout cruisers, 18 destroyers, 36 high seas torpedo craft, and six submarines. Seven months after Montecuccoli's appointment, the last of three ships of the Erzherzog Karl class, all of which were pre-dreadnoughts, was launched at the Stabilimento Tecnico Triestino in Trieste.

Two years later, the first Radetzky-class battleships were laid down. These were the last pre-dreadnought battleships to be built by the Austro-Hungarian Navy and were soon succeeded by the Tegetthoff class being built within three more years. They were the country's only class of dreadnoughts. Near the beginning of World War I, the navy started discussions on the construction of a second class of dreadnoughts named the Ersatz Monarch class to replace the old Monarchs. The plans were canceled in 1917, and no new battleships were built after that. Overall, within a period of 13 years, the Austro-Hungarian Navy had produced 13 battleships.

All of the ships saw service in World War I, although the diversion of coal, which was scarce, to the newer Tegetthoff and Radetzky classes limited the service of the remaining battleships. Following the defeat of Austria-Hungary in World War I, the empire was dismantled and all of the battleships were handed over to France, Great Britain, the United States, and Italy. (Note: The ships that were handed over to the United States immediately after the war were soon transferred to Italy and scrapped along with the rest of the battleships that Italy received from the Austro-Hungarian Navy.)

Key
Main guns	The number and type of the main battery guns
Displacement	Ship displacement at full combat load
Propulsion	Number of shafts, type of propulsion system, and top speed generated
Service	The dates work began and finished on the ship and its ultimate fate
Laid down	The date the keel began to be assembled
Launched	The date the ship was launched
Commissioned	The date the ship was commissioned

== Pre-dreadnought battleships ==
=== Habsburg class ===
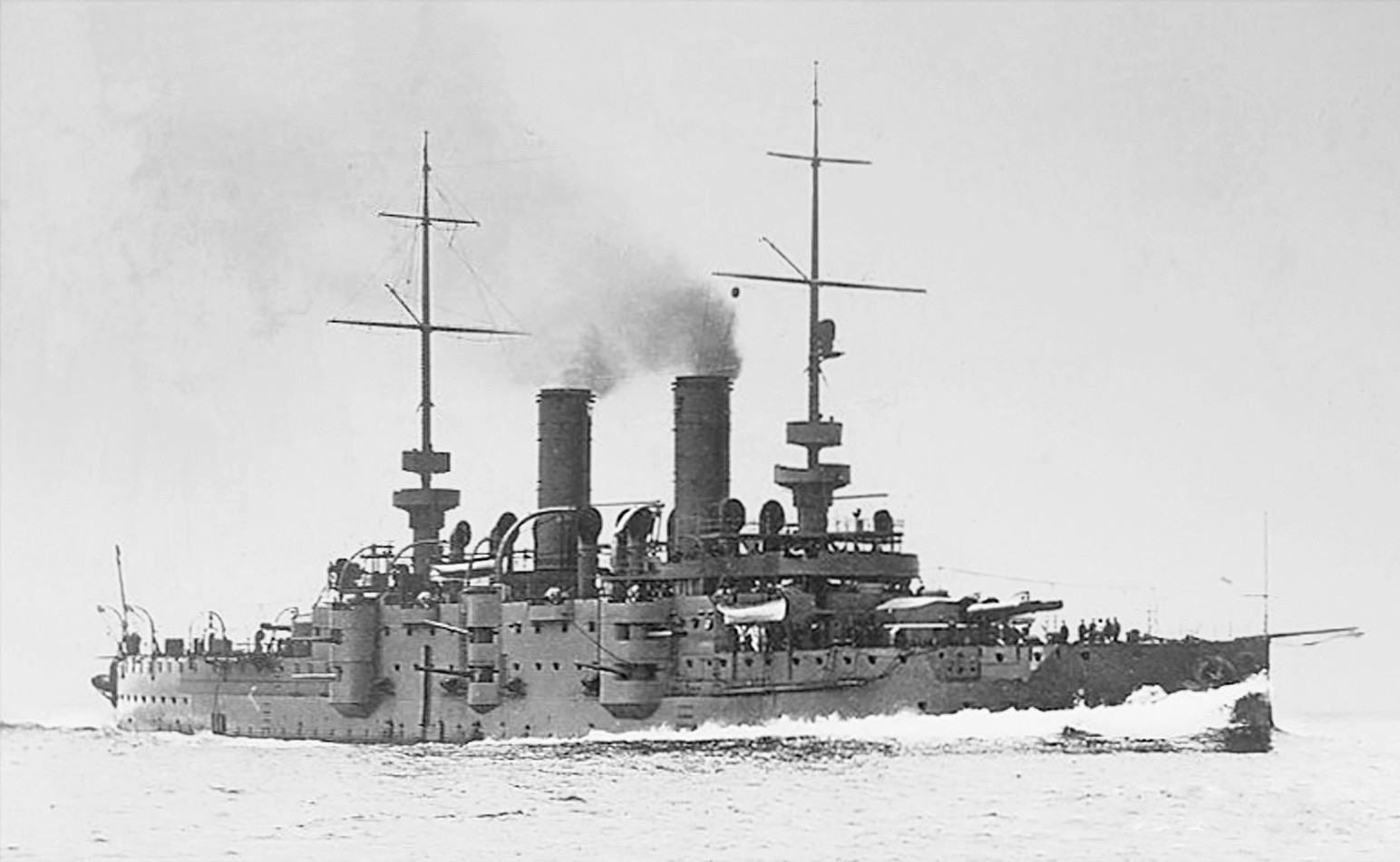
SMS Habsburg on trials in the upper Adriatic in 1901

The Habsburg-class battleships were the first class of pre-dreadnought battleships to be built by Austria-Hungary between 1899 and 1902. The construction of the Habsburg-class battleships marked the beginning of the naval expansion program by the Austro-Hungarian Navy. The Habsburg class was also the first class of seagoing battleships the Austro-Hungarian Navy built since the construction of the ship Tegetthoff 24 years earlier in 1876. The class was composed of three ships: SMS Habsburg, SMS Árpád, and SMS Babenberg.

The members of the Habsburg class were built in the Stabilimento Tecnico Triestino shipyards in Trieste. The lead ship of the class, Habsburg, was launched on 9 September 1900. Árpád followed a year later, with her launching on 11 September 1901. The last ship of the class was the Babenberg, launched on 4 October 1902. The first two ships, Habsburg and Árpád, were modernized either in 1910 and 1911 respectively, or in 1911 and 1912, by having one deck of the superstructure removed. At the outbreak of World War I in late July 1914, Habsburg was serving as the flagship of the III Battleship Division of the Austro-Hungarian fleet, under the command of Captain Miklós Horthy, alongside her two sisters. They were later transferred to the IV Division after the new Tegetthoff-class battleships came into service. All three battleships saw a limited service during World War I as members of the IV Division of the Austro-Hungarian fleet. While both Babenberg and Árpád participated in the bombardment of the Italian port city of Ancona in 1915, the class was largely inactive for the remainder of the war, serving as coastal defense ships. All three were decommissioned in 1916 in order to allow their crews to serve in the Austro-Hungarian air force and as crew members of Austro-Hungarian U-boats. Following the end of World War I, all of the Habsburg-class battleships were handed over to Great Britain. They were then sold to Italy and broken up in 1921.

Ship	Main guns	Displacement	Propulsion	Service			
Ship	Main guns	Displacement	Propulsion	Laid down	Launched	Commissioned	Fate
SMS Habsburg	3 × 24 cm (9.4 in)	8,232 t (8,102 long tons)	Two cylinder, vertical triple expansion steam engines, 19.62 kn (36.34 km/h; 22.58 mph)	13 March 1899	9 September 1900	31 December 1902	Scrapped in 1921 in Italy
SMS Árpád	3 × 24 cm (9.4 in)	8,232 t (8,102 long tons)	Two cylinder, vertical triple expansion steam engines, 19.65 kn (36.39 km/h; 22.61 mph)	10 June 1899	11 September 1901	15 June 1903	Scrapped in 1921 in Italy
SMS Babenberg	3 × 24 cm (9.4 in)	8,232 t (8,102 long tons)	Two cylinder, vertical triple expansion steam engines, 19.85 kn (36.76 km/h; 22.84 mph)	19 January 1901	4 October 1902	15 April 1904	Scrapped in 1921 in Italy

=== Erzherzog Karl class ===
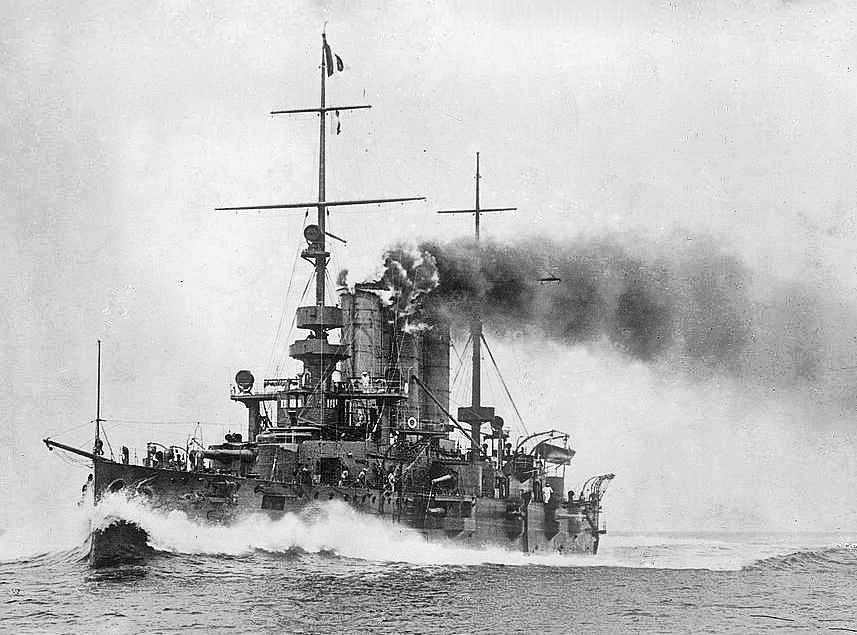
SMS Erzherzog Ferdinand Max in 1914

The Erzherzog Karl class was the second class of pre-dreadnought battleships to be built by the Austro-Hungarian Navy. Like the members of the Habsburg class before them, all of the battleships of the Erzherzog Karl class were built in the Stabilimento Tecnico Triestino shipyards in Trieste. The first battleship, SMS Erzherzog Karl was laid down in 1902. Construction on the remaining two battleships, SMS Erzherzog Ferdinand Max and SMS Erzherzog Friedrich continued up to 1905. Erzherzog Karl was commissioned in 1906, while Erzherzog Ferdinand Max and Erzherzog Friedrich were commissioned in 1907. The three Erzherzog Karl-class battleships were considered modern for their small size. Small docking space and budget restraints resulted in the class being fairly compact. They were well designed and properly protected, however the Erzherzog Karl-class battleships were inferior to the more modern Dreadnought type battleships – with their "all big gun" armament and turbine propulsion. Due to their obsolete nature, they only played a limited role during World War I.

At the beginning of World War I, the members of the Erzherzog Karl class formed the III Division of the Austro-Hungarian battle-fleet. Despite their largely inactive careers in the war, the battleships of the Erzherzog Karl class did participate in the flight of SMS Goeben and SMS Breslau during the opening days of the war as well as the bombardment of Ancona on 23 May 1915. The ships also took part in suppressing a major mutiny among the crew members of several armored cruisers stationed in Cattaro between 1 and 3 February 1918. Following Austria-Hungary's defeat in World War I, Erzherzog Karl and Erzherzog Friedrich were ceded as war reparations to France. The remaining battleship, Erzherzog Ferdinand Max, was given to Great Britain. Erzherzog Karl ran aground at Bizerte and was broken up there in 1921. The remaining two battleships were scrapped in 1921 in Italy.

Ship	Main guns	Displacement	Propulsion	Service			
Ship	Main guns	Displacement	Propulsion	Laid down	Launched	Commissioned	Fate
SMS Erzherzog Karl	4 × 24 cm (9.4 in)	10,472 t (10,307 long tons)	Four cylinder, vertical triple expansion steam engines, 20.5 kn (38.0 km/h; 23.6 mph)	24 July 1902	4 October 1903	17 June 1906	Ran aground at Bizerte, broken up there in 1921
SMS Erzherzog Friedrich	4 × 24 cm (9.4 in)	10,472 t (10,307 long tons)	Four cylinder, vertical triple expansion steam engines, 20.5 kn (38.0 km/h; 23.6 mph)	4 October 1902	30 April 1904	31 January 1907	Scrapped in 1921
SMS Erzherzog Ferdinand Max	4 × 24 cm (9.4 in)	10,472 t (10,307 long tons)	Four cylinder, vertical triple expansion steam engines, 20.5 kn (38.0 km/h; 23.6 mph)	9 March 1904	21 May 1905	21 December 1907	Scrapped in 1921

=== Radetzky class ===
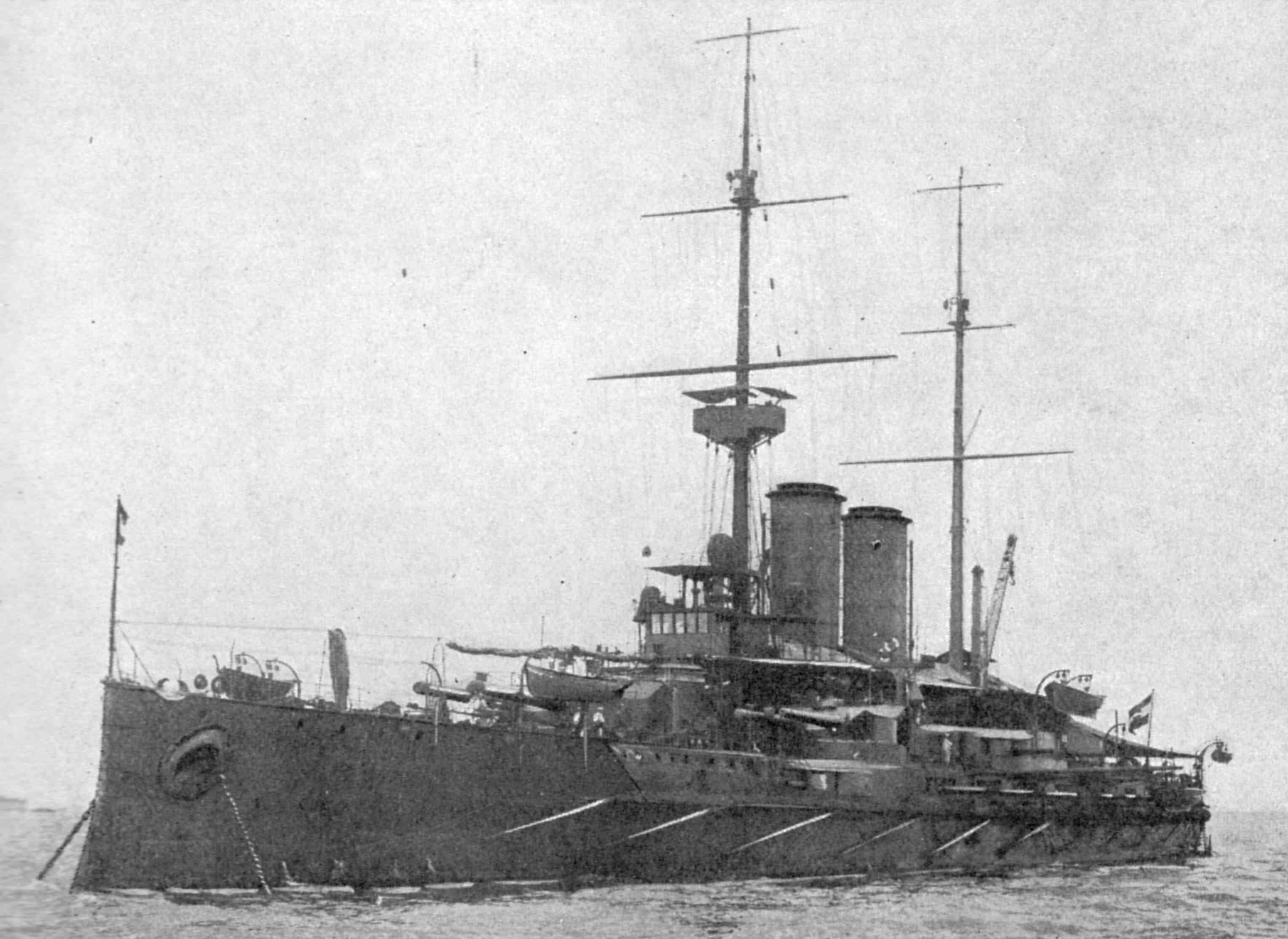
SMS Radetzky between 1909 and 1914

The Radetzky-class battleships were the third and last group of pre-dreadnought battleships to be constructed by Austria-Hungary. The class was made up of three battleships: SMS Radetzky, SMS Erzherzog Franz Ferdinand, and SMS Zrínyi; all of which were built in the Stabilimento Tecnico Triestino shipyard in Trieste between 1907 and 1910. Their heavy secondary guns were the main difference between the Radetzky-class battleships and other pre-dreadnought type battleships of the Austro-Hungarian Navy.

All three of the Radetzky-class battleships were commissioned only a few years prior the beginning of World War I. Prior to the war, all three battleships were assigned to the 2nd Division of the 1st Battle Squadron, along with the Tegetthoff-class battleships in the 1st Division. All three battleships conducted training exercises in the Mediterranean Sea from 1910 to 1911. In 1913, they participated in an international naval demonstration in the Ionian Sea that protested the Balkan Wars. During World War I, the ships had very limited service careers, hardly ever leaving port. However, in October 1914, the three ships bombarded French positions on Mount Lovćen during the Austro-Hungarian invasion of Montenegro. After Italy declared war on Austria-Hungary in 1915, the Radetzky-class battleships participated in the bombardment of the Italian city of Ancona. Following these operations, the three battleships' contributions to the war effort became minimal. They remained in port until the end of the war. Following Austria-Hungary's defeat in World War I, all three battleships were handed over to Italy and later broken up for scrap between 1920 and 1926.

Ship	Main guns	Displacement	Propulsion	Service			
Ship	Main guns	Displacement	Propulsion	Laid down	Launched	Commissioned	Fate
SMS Erzherzog Franz Ferdinand	4 × 30.5 cm (12.0 in)	14,508 t (14,279 long tons)	Four cylinder vertical triple expansion engines, 20.5 kn (38.0 km/h; 23.6 mph)	12 September 1907	8 September 1908	5 June 1910	Scrapped in 1926 in Italy
SMS Radetzky	4 × 30.5 cm (12.0 in)	14,508 t (14,279 long tons)	Four cylinder vertical triple expansion engines, 20.5 kn (38.0 km/h; 23.6 mph)	26 November 1907	3 July 1909	15 January 1911	Scrapped 1920–21 in Italy
SMS Zrínyi	4 × 30.5 cm (12.0 in)	14,508 t (14,279 long tons)	Four cylinder vertical triple expansion engines, 20.5 kn (38.0 km/h; 23.6 mph)	15 November 1908	12 April 1910	22 November 1911	Scrapped 1920–21 in Italy

== Dreadnought battleships ==
=== Tegetthoff class ===
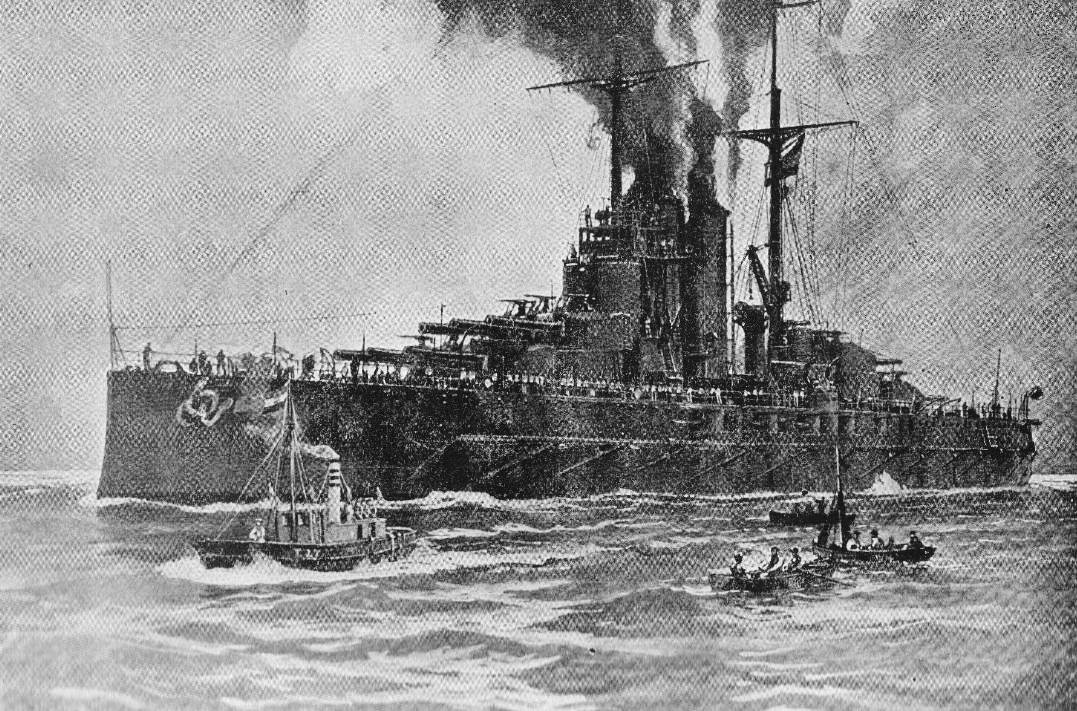
SMS Viribus Unitis in 1914

The Tegetthoff-class battleships were the only group of dreadnought battleships to be constructed by Austria-Hungary. The Austro-Hungarian Navy needed to update its fleet following the construction of HMS Dreadnought. After the announcement in 1908 of the start of construction for the first dreadnought of the Regia Marina (the Italian Navy), the Dante Alighieri, the Austro-Hungarian Navy formally ordered the construction of a series of four dreadnought battleships. Unlike the previous classes of the Austro-Hungarian Navy, the Tegetthoff class was made up of four battleships instead of three. They were the SMS Viribus Unitis, Tegetthoff, SMS Prinz Eugen, and SMS Szent István. The first three battleships were constructed in the Stabilimento Tecnico Triestino shipyard in Trieste, while the fourth battleship, Szent István was constructed at the Danubius shipyard at Fiume. All of the battleships were constructed between 1910 and 1915.

Two of the Tegetthoff-class battleships were commissioned less than two years prior the beginning of World War I, while Prinz Eugen was commissioned the same month as the assassination of Archduke Franz Ferdinand. The last battleship of the class, Szent István, was commissioned during the war in November 1915. Prior to the war, the battleships in commission were assigned to the 1st Battleship Division of the 1st Battle Squadron of the Austro-Hungarian Navy. During the war, the ships had limited service due to the Otranto Barrage, which prevented the battleships from leaving the Adriatic Sea. As a result, they rarely left Pola. However, three of the battleships participated in the flight of the German battlecruiser SMS Goeben and light cruiser SMS Breslau in 1914, and in the bombardment of the Italian city of Ancona in May 1915. (Szent István was still under construction.) Following these operations and the completion of the Szent István, the Tegetthoff-class battleships remained in port for the remainder of the war.

The final operation for the Tegetthoff-class ships was an attempt to break through the Otranto Barrage in June 1918. During the journey to the strait of Otranto, the battleship Szent István was torpedoed and sunk on 10 June 1918, resulting in the operation being called off. Viribus Unitis was also sunk prior to the end of the war on 1 November 1918 when a team of Italian frogmen sank the battleship with mines while she was moored at port in Pula. Following Austria-Hungary's defeat in World War I, the remaining two battleships of the class were handed over to the Allies with the Tegetthoff being given to Italy and scrapped in 1924 and Prinz Eugen being handed over to France and sunk as a target ship in 1922.

Ship	Main guns	Displacement	Propulsion	Service			
Ship	Main guns	Displacement	Propulsion	Laid down	Launched	Commissioned	Fate
SMS Viribus Unitis	12 × 30.48 cm (12.00 in)	20,008 t (19,692 long tons)	Four Parsons steam turbines, 20 kn (37 km/h; 23 mph)	24 July 1910	24 June 1911	5 December 1912	Sunk by a limpet mine on 1 November 1918 at Pula
SMS Tegetthoff	12 × 30.48 cm (12.00 in)	20,008 t (19,692 long tons)	Four Parsons steam turbines, 20 kn (37 km/h; 23 mph)	24 September 1910	21 March 1912	14 July 1913	Scrapped in 1924 in Italy
SMS Prinz Eugen	12 × 30.48 cm (12.00 in)	20,008 t (19,692 long tons)	Four Parsons steam turbines, 20 kn (37 km/h; 23 mph)	16 January 1912	30 November 1912	8 July 1914	Sunk as a target ship by France in 1922
SMS Szent István	12 × 30.48 cm (12.00 in)	20,008 t (19,692 long tons)	Two AEG-Curtis steam turbines, 20 kn (37 km/h; 23 mph)	29 January 1912	17 January 1914	13 December 1915	Sunk on 10 June 1918 by a torpedo from an Italian torpedoboat

=== Ersatz Monarch class ===
The Ersatz Monarch class (literally Replacement Monarch class) was a projected series of four battleships that would have been constructed for the Austro-Hungarian Navy between 1914 and 1919. They were essentially an enlarged version of the Tegetthoff class and were meant to replace the aging Monarch-class coastal defense ships. Due to World War I, none were laid down and all four were eventually canceled in late 1917. There were supposed to be four battleships in the class (named "Battleship VIII" to "Battleship XI"). While the battleships were never laid down, four of the main guns were constructed and later transferred to the Austro-Hungarian Army for use on the Italian Front.

Ship	Main guns	Displacement	Propulsion	Service			
Ship	Main guns	Displacement	Propulsion	Laid down	Launched	Commissioned	Fate
Battleship VIII	10 × 36 cm (14 in)	24,500 t (24,100 long tons)	Four shaft steam turbines, 21.0 kn (38.9 km/h; 24.2 mph)	—			Canceled in 1917
Battleship IX	10 × 36 cm (14 in)	24,500 t (24,100 long tons)	Four shaft steam turbines, 21.0 kn (38.9 km/h; 24.2 mph)	—			Canceled in 1917
Battleship X	10 × 36 cm (14 in)	24,500 t (24,100 long tons)	Four shaft steam turbines, 21.0 kn (38.9 km/h; 24.2 mph)	—			Canceled in 1917
Battleship XI	10 × 36 cm (14 in)	24,500 t (24,100 long tons)	Four shaft steam turbines, 21.0 kn (38.9 km/h; 24.2 mph)	—			Canceled in 1917

== See also ==
- List of battleships
- List of ironclad warships of Austria-Hungary
- Monarch class
- List of cruisers of Austria-Hungary
- List of ships of Austria-Hungary
