= SMS Wien =

Austro-Hungarian Navy's Monarch-class coastal defense ship

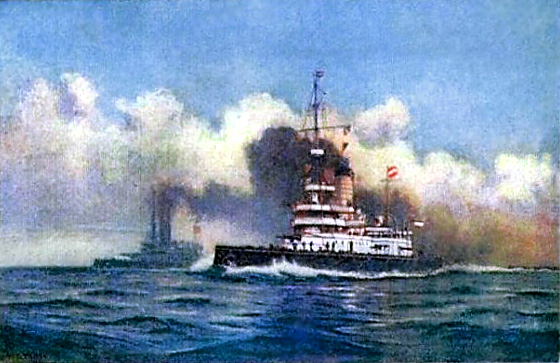
- A painting showing SMS Wien and the other ships of the Monarch class on maneuvers

History

Austro-Hungarian Empire
- Name: SMS Wien
- Namesake: Vienna, Austria
- Ordered: May 1892
- Builder: Stabilimento Tecnico Triestino, Trieste
- Laid down: 16 February 1893
- Launched: 7 July 1895
- Sponsored by: Countess Kielmannsegg
- Commissioned: 13 May 1897
- Fate: Sunk, 10 December 1917, salvaged and scrapped 1920s

General characteristics
- Class & type: Monarch-class coastal defense ship
- Displacement: 5,785 tonnes (5,694 long tons) (full load)
- Length: 99.22 m (325 ft 6 in)
- Beam: 17 m (55 ft 9 in)
- Draught: 6.4 m (21 ft 0 in)
- Installed power: 8,600 ihp (6,400 kW); 5 × cylindrical boilers
- Propulsion: 2 × Shafts; 2 × Vertical triple-expansion steam engines
- Speed: 17.5 knots (32.4 km/h; 20.1 mph)
- Range: 3,500 nmi (6,500 km; 4,000 mi) @ 9 knots (17 km/h; 10 mph)
- Complement: 26 officers and 397 enlisted men
- Armament: 2 × 2 - 240 mm (9.4 in) Krupp guns; 6 × 1 - 150 mm (5.9 in) Škoda guns; 1 × 7 cm (2.8 in) anti-aircraft gun; 10 × 1 - 47 mm (1.9 in) Škoda guns; 4 × 1 - 47 mm (1.9 in) Hotchkiss guns; 2 × 450 mm (17.7 in) torpedo tubes
- Armour: Waterline belt: 120–270 mm (4.7–10.6 in); Deck: 40 mm (1.6 in); Gun turrets: 250 mm (9.8 in); Casemate: 80 mm (3.1 in); Conning tower: 220 mm (8.7 in)

SMS Wien (Note: "SMS" stands for "Seiner Majestät Schiff", or "His Majesty's Ship" in German.) ("His Majesty's Ship Vienna") was one of three Monarch-class coastal defense ships built for the Austro-Hungarian Navy in the 1890s. After her commissioning, the ship participated in an international blockade of Crete during the Greco-Turkish War of 1897. Wien and the two other Monarch-class ships made several training cruises in the Mediterranean Sea in the early 1900s. They formed the 1st Capital Ship Division of the Austro-Hungarian Navy until they were replaced by the newly commissioned Habsburg-class predreadnought battleships at the turn of the century. In 1906 the three Monarchs were placed in reserve and only recommissioned for annual summer training exercises. After the start of World War I, Wien was recommissioned and assigned to 5th Division together with her sisters.

The division was sent to Cattaro in August 1914 to attack Montenegrin and French artillery that was bombarding the port and they remained there until mid-1917. Wien and her sister Budapest were sent to Trieste in August 1917 and bombarded Italian fortifications in the Gulf of Trieste. On the night of 9–10 December, while Wien and Budapest were at anchor in Trieste, two Italian torpedo boats managed to penetrate the harbor defenses undetected and fired several torpedoes at the two ships. Budapest was not hit, but Wien was struck by two torpedoes and sank in less than five minutes with the loss of 46 of her crew. The wreck was salvaged sometime during the 1920s by the Italians.

== Description and construction ==
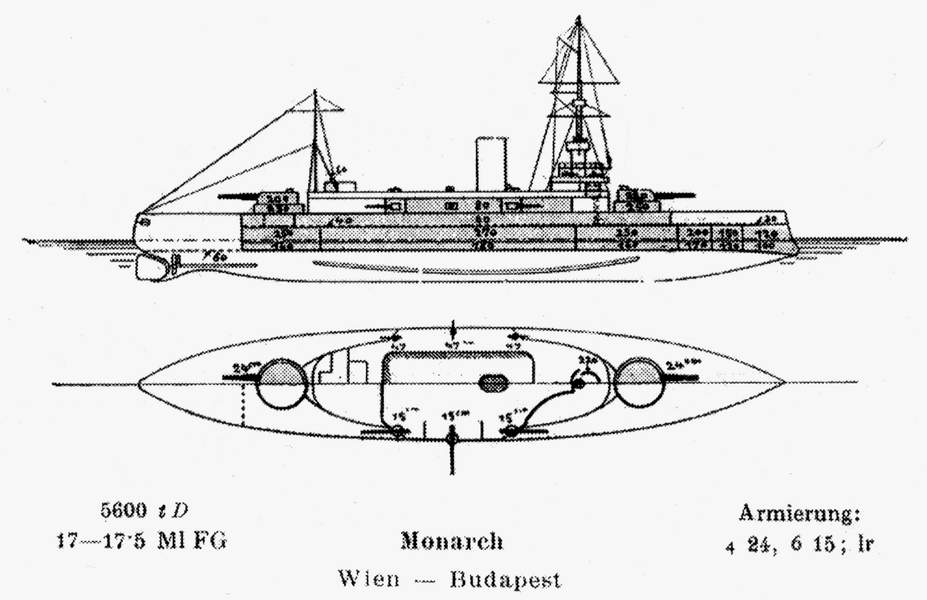
Right elevation and plan of the Monarch class; the shaded area is armored

At only 5,785 tonnes (5,694 long tons) maximum displacement, the Monarch class was less than half the size of the battleships of other major navies at the time and were officially designated as coast defense ships. The Austro-Hungarian government believed that the role of its navy was solely to defend her coast.

Wien had an overall length of 99.22 meters (325 ft 6 in), a beam of 17 meters (55 ft 9 in) and a draft of 6.4 meters (21 ft 0 in). Her two 4-cylinder vertical triple-expansion steam engines produced a total of 8,500 indicated horsepower (6,300 kW) using steam from five cylindrical boilers. These gave the ship a maximum speed of 17.5 knots (32.4 km/h; 20.1 mph). Wien's maximum load of 500 metric tons (490 LT) of coal gave her a range of 3,500 nautical miles (6,500 km; 4,000 mi) at a speed of 9 knots (17 km/h; 10 mph). She was manned by 26 officers and 397 enlisted men, a total of 423 personnel.

The armament of the Monarch class consisted of four 240-millimeter (9.4 in) Krupp K/94 guns mounted in two twin-gun turrets, one each fore and aft of the superstructure. The ships carried 80 rounds for each gun. Their secondary armament was six 150-millimeter (5.9 in) Škoda guns located in casemates in the superstructure. Defense against torpedo boats was provided by ten quick-firing (QF) 47 mm (1.9 in) Škoda guns and four 47-millimeter QF Hotchkiss guns. The ships also mounted two 450-millimeter (18 in) torpedo tubes, one on each broadside. Each torpedo tube was provided with two torpedoes. In 1917 a Škoda 7 cm K10 anti-aircraft gun was installed.

The ship's nickel-steel waterline armor belt was 120–270 millimeters (4.7–10.6 in) thick and the gun turrets were protected by 250 millimeters (9.8 in) of armor. The casemates had 80 millimeters (3.1 in) thick sides while the conning tower had 220 millimeters (8.7 in) of armor. Wien's deck armor was 40 millimeters (1.6 in) thick.

The Monarch-class ships were ordered in May 1892 with Budapest and Wien to be built at the Stabilimento Tecnico Triestino shipyard in Trieste. Both ships were laid down on 16 February 1893, the first ships in the class to be laid down. Wien was launched on 7 July 1895 by Countess Kielmannsegg, wife of the Governor of Lower Austria, and commissioned on 13 May 1897.

== Service history ==
=== Peacetime ===
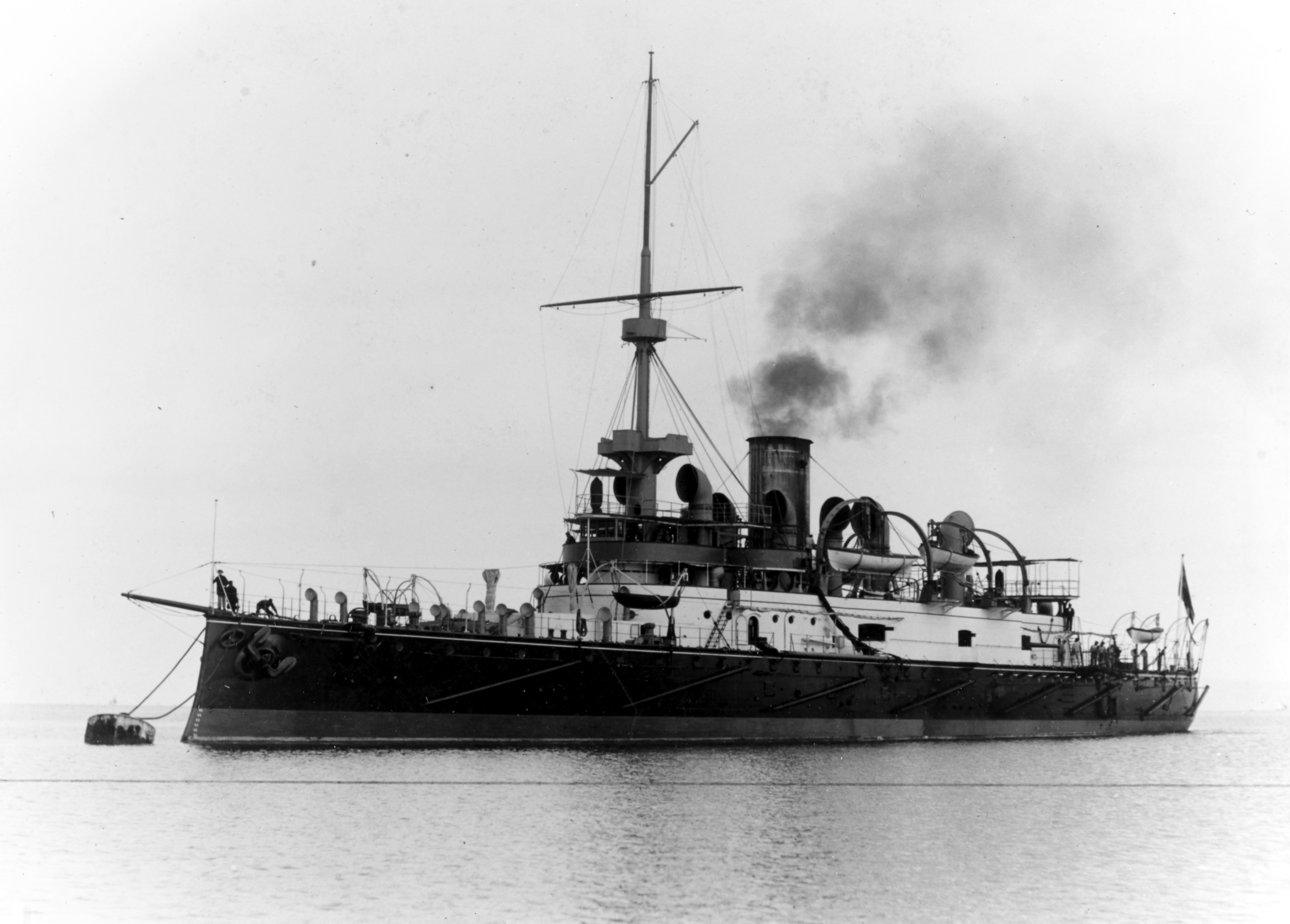
SMS Wien circa 1898

After her commissioning, Wien took part in Queen Victoria's Diamond Jubilee International Fleet Review at Spithead on 26 June 1897, as well as an international blockade of Crete during the Greco-Turkish War of 1897. She was back at Pola on 16 April 1898. Wien and her sisters formed the Navy's 1st Capital Ship Division (I. Schwere Divisio) in 1899 and the division made a training cruise to the Eastern Mediterranean where they made port visits in Greece, Lebanon, Turkey and Malta later that year. In early 1902 they made another training cruise to the Western Mediterranean with port visits in Algeria, Spain, France, Italy, Corfu, and Albania. The ship was fitted with a Siemens-Braun radio early the following year. The ships of the division were inspected by Archduke Franz Ferdinand, the heir to the throne, in March 1903 at Gravosa. Shortly afterwards, Wien, Budapest, the battleship Habsburg and the destroyer Magnet made a cruise to the Eastern Mediterranean. Wien served as flagship of the division until she was posted at Salonica in the Ottoman Empire on 13 May to support Austro-Hungarian interests there after several terrorist acts against Austro-Hungarian citizens. She returned to Pola on 10 June and resumed her assignment as flagship. In 1904, the Monarch-class ships formed the 2nd Capital Ship Division and they took part in the 1904 cruise of the Adriatic and Mediterranean Seas as well as training exercises in which the three Habsburg-class battleships engaged the Budapest and her sisters in simulated combat. Those maneuvers marked the first time two homogeneous squadrons consisting of modern battleships operated in the Austro-Hungarian Navy. In 1905, Wien made a cruise of the Levant and visited ports in Greece, the Ottoman Empire, Egypt and Albania. Later that summer, the ship ran aground during a night exercise off Meleda Island; it took two tries by Budapest and Habsburg to pull her off. She had to be dry-docked for repairs.

The Monarchs were relegated to the newly formed Reserve Squadron on 1 January 1906 and were only recommissioned for the annual summer exercises. They participated in a fleet review by Archduke Franz Ferdinand in September conducted in the Koločepski Channel near Šipan. The ships were briefly recommissioned at the beginning of 1913 as the 4th Division after the start of the Second Balkan War, but were decommissioned again on 10 March.

=== World War I ===
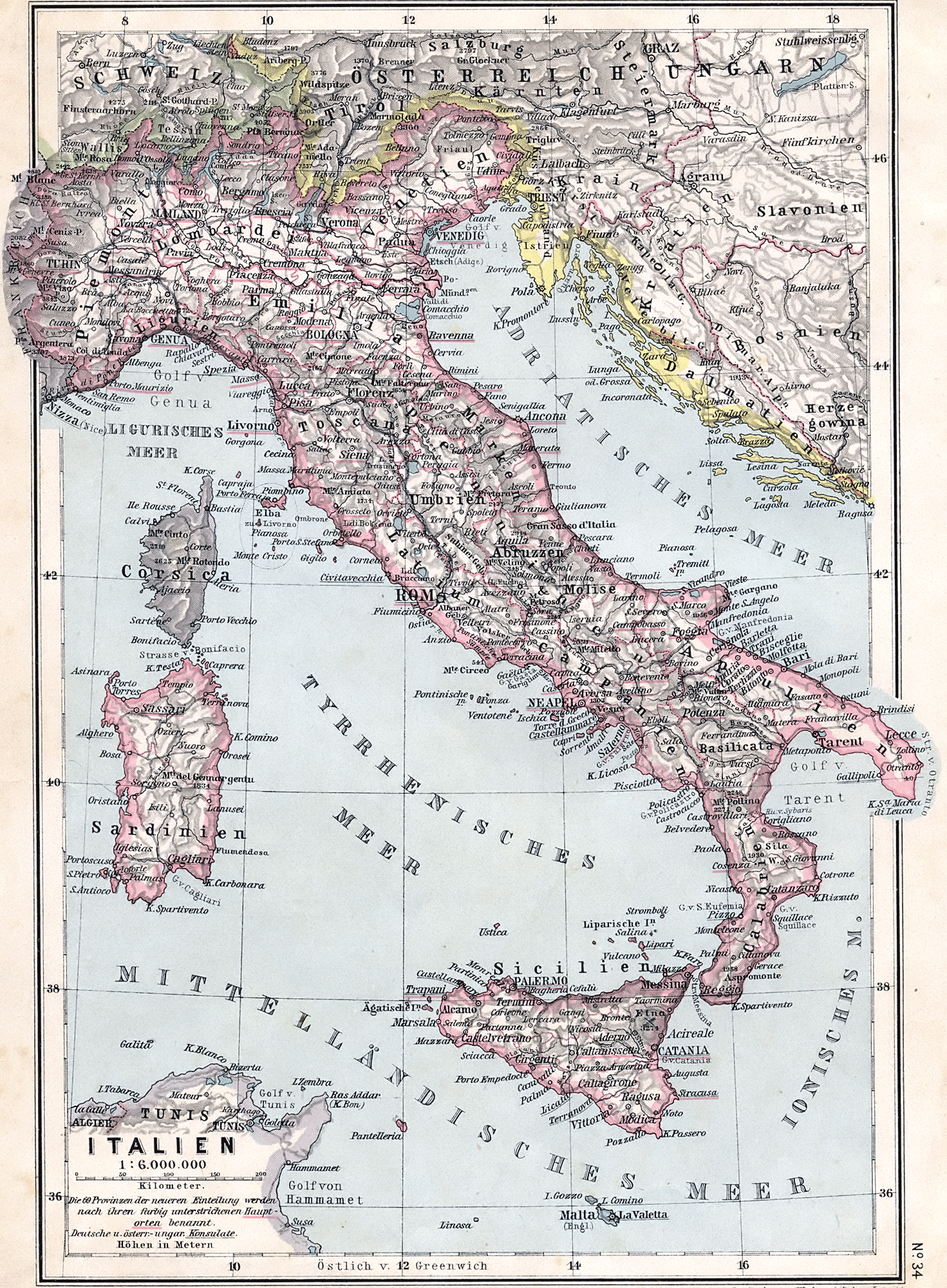
A map of Italy with the Adriatic Sea at upper right

With the beginning of World War I the three Monarchs were recommissioned as the 5th Division. They were sent down to the Cattaro in August 1914 to attack Montenegrin artillery batteries on Mount Lovćen bombarding the Austro-Hungarian naval base at Cattaro and the fortifications defending it. Budapest and her sisters arrived on 13 August, but their guns could not elevate sufficiently enough to engage all of the enemy artillery, which was reinforced by eight French guns on 19 October. The battleship Radetzky was summoned to deal with the guns two days later and she managed to knock out several French guns and forced the others to be withdrawn by 27 October. The Monarchs remained at Cattaro until mid-1917 to deter any further attacks. In August, Budapest and Wien were transferred to Trieste to serve as guard ships against Italian commando raids. Each ship was fitted with an anti-aircraft gun after their arrival on 26 August to counter constant Italian air attacks. Wien was damaged by a near miss on 5 September and both ships withdrew to Pola on 12 September.

They returned to Trieste on 30 October and sortied into the Gulf of Trieste on 16 November to attack Italian coastal defenses at Cortellazzo, near the mouth of the Piave River. Budapest and Wien opened fire at 10:35 at a range of about 9–10 kilometers (5.6–6.2 mi) and knocked out most of the Italian guns after about a half-hour. Their bombardment was interrupted by several unsuccessful Italian air attacks before a more coordinated attack was made by five MAS torpedo boats and five aircraft around 13:30. This was also unsuccessful and the last Italian coast defense gun was knocked out an hour later. Wien was hit seven times in the superstructure and only lightly damaged; none of her crewmen were wounded.

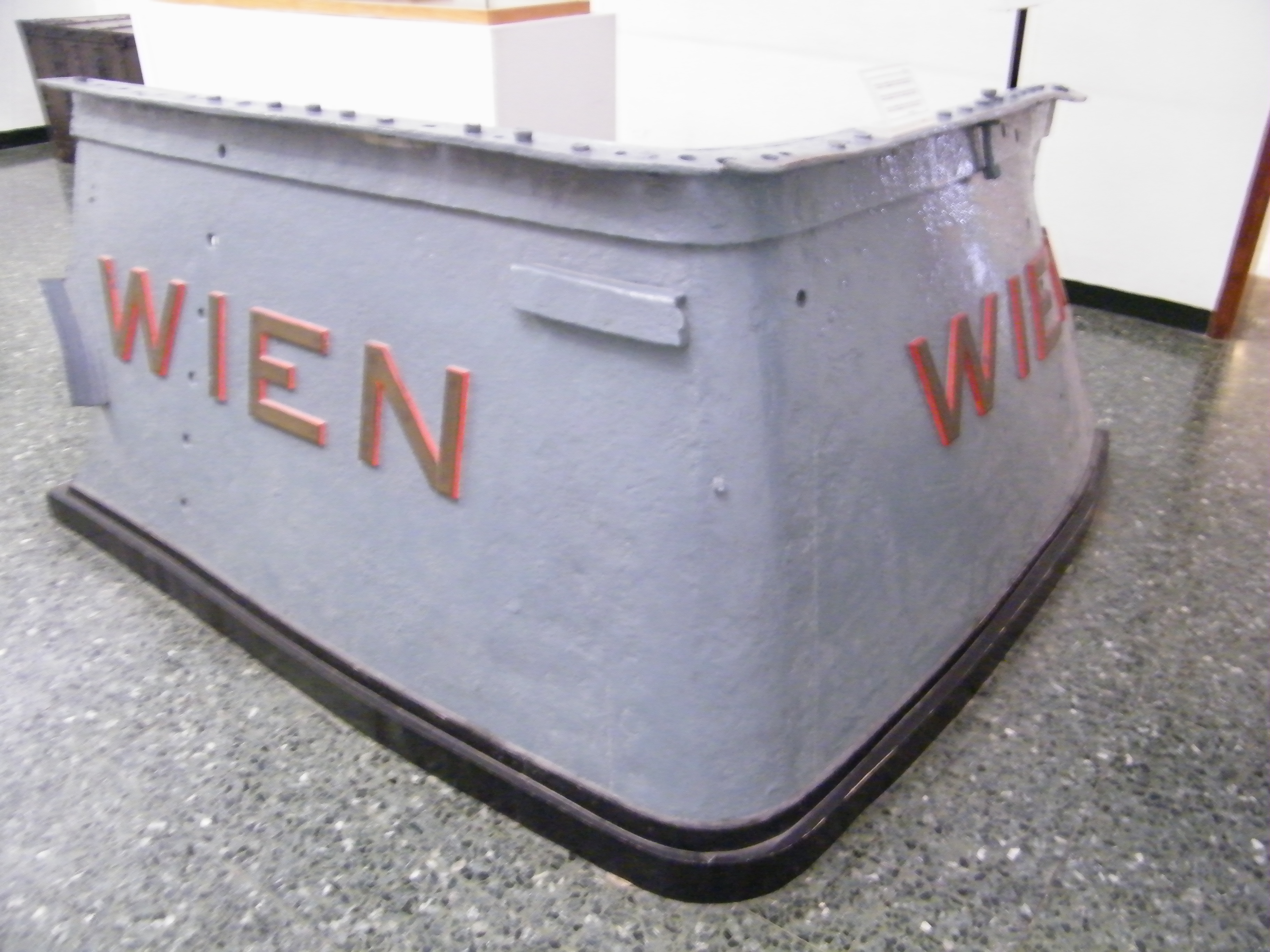
Stern section of Wien at the Museo Storico Navale, Venice

Anxious to avenge themselves against the Austro-Hungarians, the Regia Marina (Royal Italian Navy) made plans for a sneak attack on the two ships in their berths in the Bay of Muggia, near Trieste, by MAS launches. On the night of 9/10 December, two MAS boats managed to penetrate the harbor defenses undetected, and fired torpedoes at Wien and Budapest at 02:32. The torpedoes fired at Budapest missed, but Wien was hit by two torpedoes fired by MAS 9, commanded by Lieutenant (tenente di vascello) Luigi Rizzo, that blew a hole 10.5-meter (34 ft) wide abreast the boiler rooms. All of the watertight doors were open on board the Wien and the ship capsized in five minutes despite an attempt to counter her growing list by flooding the trim tanks on the opposite side. The attack killed 46 members of the crew. Both Italian boats escaped without being detected and Rizzo was awarded the Gold Medal of Military Valor.

Wien was buried in the mud of the harbor bottom at a depth of 16.5 meters (54 ft) and salvage of the ship was ordered on 14 December. That same day the navy convened a court-martial of Vice Admiral Alfred Freiherr von Koudelka, commander of the naval district, the captains of both ships, and the commander of the naval defenses of Trieste. On 16 January 1918, the court convicted all four individuals for failing to take all possible precautions to protect the ships and failing to ensure that the precautions were taken. As punishment the court recommended that Koudelka and the two ship captains be retired and the commander of the naval defenses of Trieste to be returned to his former reserve status. Emperor Karl approved the recommendations on 23 January.

The navy ordered that the salvage of Wien be stopped on 7 June and the wreck was ultimately salvaged by the Italians sometime during the 1920s. A section of the ship's stern is on display at the Museo Storico Navale in Venice.
