= Janko Vuković =

Naval officer

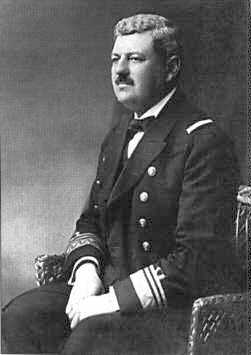
- Janko Vuković
- Born: 27 November 1871; Jezerane, Croatia-Slavonia, Austria-Hungary
- Died: 1 November 1918 (aged 46); SMS Viribus Unitis, off Pula, Austria-Hungary
- Military career
- Allegiance: Austria-Hungary; State of Slovenes, Croats and Serbs
- Branch: Austro-Hungarian Navy
- Service years: 1890-1918
- Rank: Ship-of-the-Line Captain; Rear-admiral
- Commands: State of SCS Navy; SMS Viribus Unitis; SMS Babenberg; SMS Admiral Spaun; 1st Destroyer Squadron
- Conflicts: Adriatic Campaign of World War I: Battle of Palagruža; Battle of the Strait of Otranto (1917)
- Awards: Order of the Iron Crown Military Merit Cross Karl Troop Cross

Janko Vuković, sometimes spelt Janko Vukovich or von Vukovich, also known as Janko Vuković de Podkapelski or Janko Vuković-Podkapelski (27 September 1871 – 1 November 1918) was a Croatian naval officer who served in the Austro-Hungarian Navy and - amidst its collapse - for a brief period as commander of the fleet of the fledgling State of Slovenes, Croats and Serbs. Vuković saw action in World War I and was appointed commander of the fleet in October 1918 as Austria-Hungary disintegrated and the entire navy was handed over to the fledgling State of Slovenes, Croats and Serbs. He died on board the SMS Viribus Unitis, sunk by Italian commandos.

== Biography ==
He attended the Imperial and Royal Naval Academy in Fiume (modern Rijeka), and in his naval career he commanded the Habsburg-class pre-Dreadnought SMS Babenberg, the fast light cruiser SMS Admiral Spaun, and rose to the command of the fleet's flagship, the dreadnought SMS Viribus Unitis by the end of the First World War.

== Viribus Unitis sinking ==
On October 29, 1918 the National Council of Slovenes, Croats and Serbs broke off all relations with Austria and Hungary, establishing the new State of Slovenes, Croats and Serbs. Subsequently, Emperor Charles I gave the entire Austro-Hungarian Navy, merchant fleet, and all its installations to the new state. When representatives of the National Council arrived at the naval base at Pula on October 31, the commander in chief, Admiral Miklós Horthy, asked to whom he should hand over command of the fleet. The representatives had not considered the matter, and after some discussion accepted Horthy's suggestion of Vuković, who was promoted to rear-admiral and made commander in chief of the new country's navy when Horthy's flag was lowered at 5 pm.

Overnight, an Italian sabotage team from a nearby patrol boat, who had not heard of the new State's creation and non-belligerence, penetrated the harbour and laid two 200 kg mines under the Viribus Unitis ready to explode at 6:30 sharp. The two-man team was captured and taken aboard Viribus Unitis, where they informed Vuković of what they had done.

Vuković arranged for the prisoners (Raffaele Paolucci and Raffaele Rossetti) to be taken safely to the sister ship Tegetthoff, and ordered the evacuation of the ship. But the explosion did not happen at 6:30 and Vukovic returned to the ship with many sailors. He therefore remained on his ship and went down with her and 300-400 of her crew when the mines exploded shortly afterwards at 6:44. Vuković had been commander-in-chief of his country's fleet for barely twelve hours.

== Legacy ==
The remains of the crew of the Viribus Unitis were buried at the Naval Cemetery Pula and Vuković's widow Helena honored him with a plaque on the chapel of that same graveyard in 1919. A memorial plaque commemorating his birthplace was attached to his birthhouse in Jezerane in 1994. His name is also preserved on a plaque honouring all admirals that graduated from the former Austro-Hungarian Naval Academy in Rijeka, unveiled by Croatian President Ivo Josipović on Navy Day in 2011. Central square in Brinje and a street in Zagreb are named after Vuković.

Vuković's tragic fate and his sense of honor and duty have inspired an eponymous song by cabaret-rock band from Pula "Gori Ussi Winnetou" as well as two novels: Admiral by Stjepan Vukušić and Admiralski stijeg by Ivan Katušić.

== Bibliography ==
- Vukušić, Stjepan. Admiral. Roman o Janku Vukoviću pl. Podkapelskom, prvom hrvatskom admiralu. Zagreb, Naklada Pavičić, 2004; ISBN 953-6308-55-X
- Katušić, Ivan. Admiralski stijeg. Zagreb, Znanje, 1987
