= SMS Babenberg =

Austro-Hungarian Navy's pre-dreadnought battleship

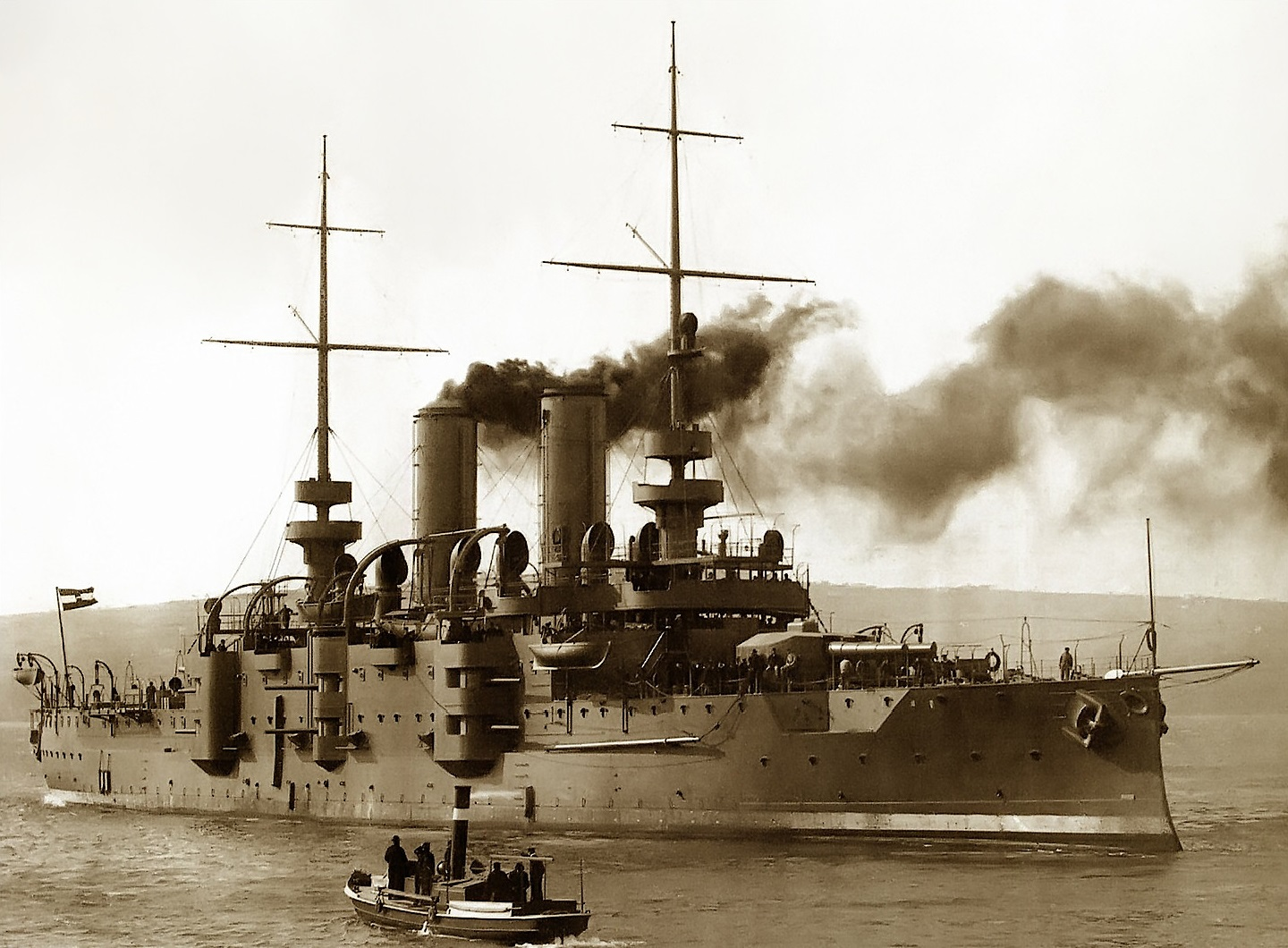
- SMS Babenberg in 1914

History

Austria-Hungary
- Name: Babenberg
- Namesake: House of Babenberg
- Builder: STT
- Laid down: 19 January 1901
- Launched: 4 October 1902
- Christened: Countess Marianne von Goess
- Completed: 15 April 1904
- Fate: Scrapped, 1921

General characteristics
- Class & type: Habsburg-class pre-dreadnought battleship
- Displacement: 8,232 long tons (8,364 t); 8,823 long tons (8,965 t) full load
- Length: 375 ft 10 in (114.6 m)
- Beam: 65 ft (19.8 m)
- Draft: 24 ft 6 in (7.5 m)
- Installed power: 16,000 ihp (11,931 kW)
- Propulsion: 2 shafts, 4-cylinder vertical triple expansion steam engines, 16 Belleville boilers
- Speed: 19.85 knots (36.76 km/h; 22.84 mph)
- Complement: 638
- Armament: 3 × 24 cm (9.4 in)/40 cal. Krupp C97 guns; 12 × 15 cm (5.9 in)/40 cal. Krupp C96 guns; 10 × 66 mm (2.6 in)/45 cal Skoda guns; 6 × 47 mm (1.9 in)/44 cal Skoda QF guns; 2 × 4.7 cm/33 cal Skoda QF guns; 2 × 45 cm (17.7 in) torpedo tubes
- Armor: Waterline belt: 180–220 mm (7.1–8.7 in); Deck: 40 mm (1.6 in); Turrets & casemates: 210–280 mm (8.3–11.0 in); Conning tower: 150 mm (5.9 in)

SMS Babenberg (Note: "SMS" stands for "Seiner Majestät Schiff", or "His Majesty's Ship" in German.) was a pre-dreadnought battleship built by the Austro-Hungarian Navy. She was launched on 4 October 1902 as the last of three Habsburg-class battleships. Along with her sister ships, she participated at the bombardment of Ancona during World War I. At the end of the war, she was given to Great Britain as a war prize. She was scrapped in Italy in 1921.

== Construction and layout ==
Babenberg was the last of three battleships of her class. Her keel was laid down on 19 January 1901 at the Stabilimento Tecnico Triestino shipyard in Trieste. Following about a year and a half of construction, she was launched on 4 October 1902, when she was named by Countess Marianne von Goess, wife of the Statthalter of Trieste, Count Leopold von Goess. After final fitting-out work was completed, the ship was commissioned into the Austro-Hungarian fleet on 15 April 1904.

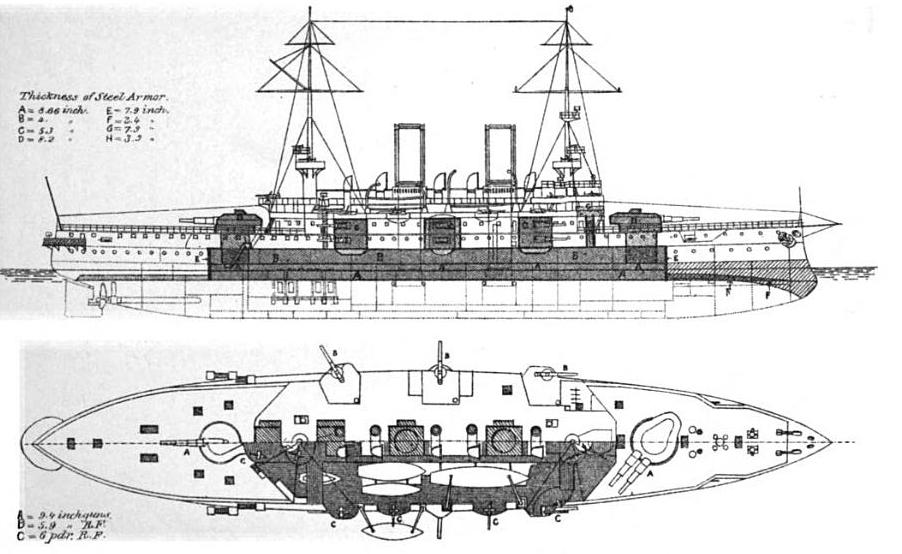
Line-drawing of the Habsburg-class ships; shaded areas show the extent of the armor layout

Like all ships of her class, Babenberg was 113.11 meters (371 ft 1 in) long at the waterline and was 114.55 m (375 ft 10 in) in overall length. She had a beam of 19.8 m (65 ft 0 in) and a draft of 7.5 m (24 ft 7 in). Freeboard was approximately 5.8 m (19 ft 0 in) forward and about 5.5 m (18 ft 1 in) aft. The ship also displaced 8,364 metric tons (8,232 long tons). Once construction was finished, she was commissioned into the Navy with a crew of 638 officers and enlisted men.

Babenberg was powered by 2-shaft, 4-cylinder vertical triple expansion engines, which were supplied with steam by 16 Belleville boilers. Babenberg's power output was rated at 16,000 indicated horsepower (12,000 kW), which produced a top speed of 19.85 knots (36.76 km/h; 22.84 mph).

The hull for the ship was constructed from longitudinal and transverse steel frames, over which the outer hull plates were riveted into place. The hull incorporated a double bottom that ran for 63% of the ship's length. A series of watertight bulkheads also extended from the keel to the gun deck. All in all, there was a total of 174 watertight compartments in the ship. Babenberg had a metacentric height of between .82 m (2.7 ft) and 1.02 m (3.3 ft). Bilge keels were mounted on either side of the hull to reduce rolling and prevent her from capsizing. Babenberg had a flush main deck that was planked with wood, while the upper decks were covered with linoleum or corticine.

Babenberg had three 24 cm (9.4 in) L/40 guns, two mounted in a twin turret forward and one mounted in a single turret aft of the main superstructure. The C 97-type guns were manufactured by Krupp in Germany. The main guns fired at a rate of between three and four 215 kg (474 lb) armor-piercing (AP) shells per minute. Her secondary armament consisted of twelve 15 cm (5.9 in) SK L/40 guns in casemates. These guns could fire at 4–5 shells per minute. Babenberg was built with face-hardened chrome-nickel steel. The main armored belt was 220 mm (8.7 in) in the central portion of the ship, where the ammunition magazines, machinery spaces, and other critical areas were located. The belt tapered slightly to 180 mm (7.1 in) on either end of the central section.

== Service history ==
=== Peacetime ===
When Babenberg was commissioned in 1904, she began participation in fleet drills with her sister ships SMS Árpád and SMS Habsburg. Following a series of simulated wargames against the three Monarch-class battleships, Babenberg and the other two Habsburg-class ships became the I Battleship Division. With the commissioning of the Erzherzog Karl-class battleships in 1906 and 1907, the Habsburg-class battleships were transferred from the I to the II Battleship Division, and the three Monarch-class battleships were moved from the II to the III Battleship Division.

=== World War I ===
During World War I, Babenberg served with the IV Division of the Austro-Hungarian Navy's battleships and along with her sister ships Habsburg and Árpád and the remainder of the Austro-Hungarian Navy. Babenberg was mobilized on the eve of World War I to support the flight of SMS Goeben and Breslau. The two German ships were stationed in the Mediterranean and were attempting to break out of the strait of Messina, which was surrounded by British troops and vessels and make their way to the Ottoman Empire. After the Germans successfully broke out of Messina, the navy was recalled. The fleet had by that time advanced as far south as Brindisi in southeastern Italy. Babenberg and her sister ships also participated in the Bombardment of Ancona after the Italian declaration of war on the Central Powers. Towards the end of the war, the ship was decommissioned and was retained as a harbor defense ship. Following the end of the war, the ship was awarded to Great Britain as a war prize, but was instead sold and broken up for scrapping in Italy in 1921.
