= SMS Árpád =

Austro-Hungarian Navy's Habsburg-class pre-dreadnought battleship

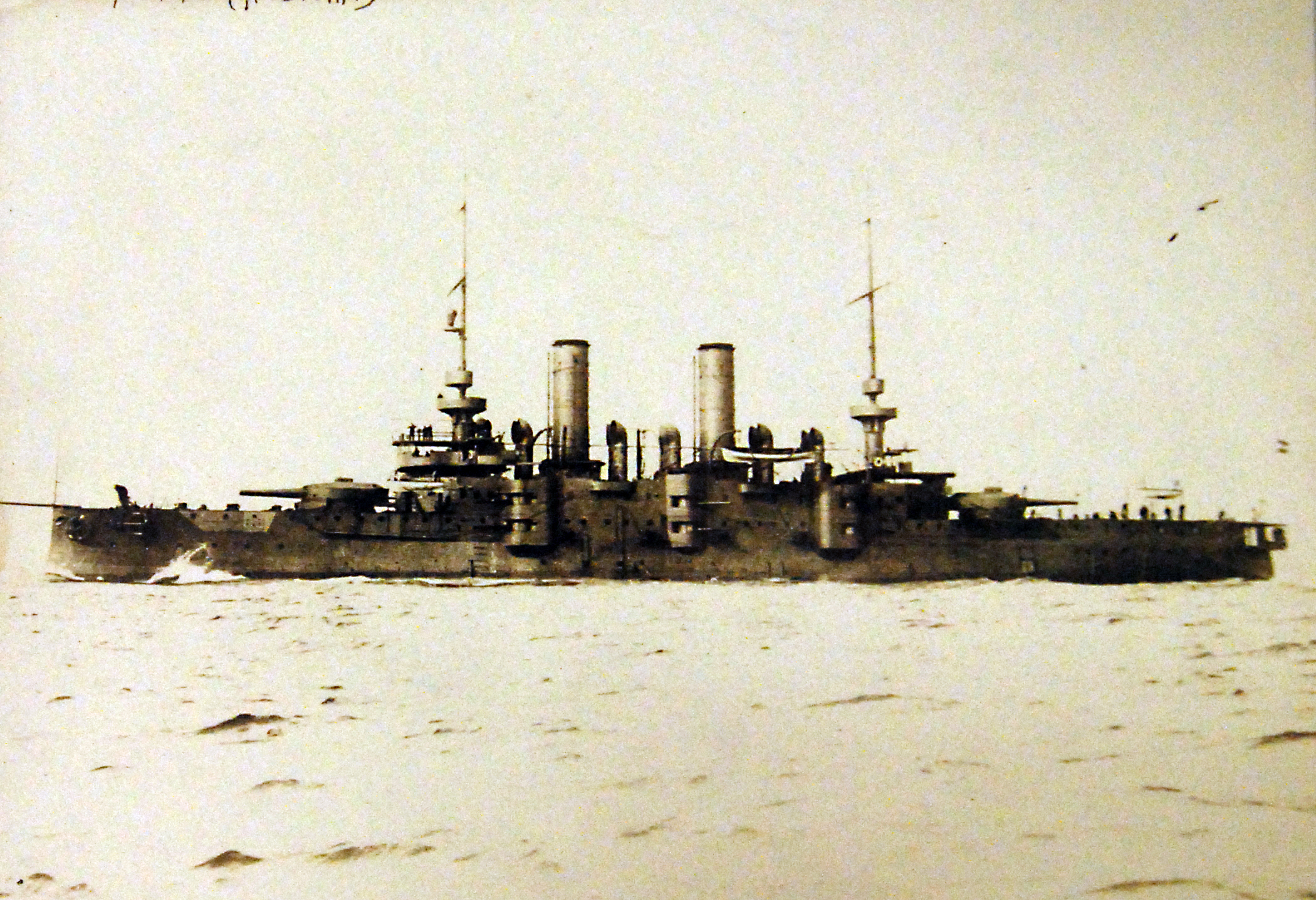
- Árpád in 1914

History

Austria-Hungary
- Name: Árpád
- Namesake: Árpád, Grand Prince of the Hungarians
- Builder: STT
- Laid down: 10 June 1899
- Launched: 11 September 1901
- Commissioned: 15 June 1903
- Fate: Scrapped, 1921

General characteristics
- Class & type: Habsburg-class pre-dreadnought battleship
- Displacement: 8,232 long tons (8,364 t); 8,748 long tons (8,888 t) full load
- Length: 375 ft 10 in (114.6 m)
- Beam: 65 ft (19.8 m)
- Draft: 24 ft 6 in (7.5 m)
- Installed power: 14,307 ihp (10,669 kW)
- Propulsion: 2 shafts, 4-cylinder vertical triple expansion steam engines, 16 Belleville boilers
- Speed: 19.65 knots (36.39 km/h; 22.61 mph)
- Complement: 638
- Armament: 3 × 24 cm (9.4 in)/40 cal. Krupp C97 guns; 12 × 15 cm (5.9 in)/40 cal. Krupp C96 guns; 10 × 6.6-centimeter (2.6 in)/45 cal Skoda guns; 6 × 47 mm (1.9 in)/44 cal Skoda QF guns; 2 × 4.7-cm/33 cal Skoda QF guns; 2 × 45-centimeter (17.7 in) torpedo tubes
- Armor: Waterline belt: 180–220 mm (7.1–8.7 in); Deck: 40 mm (1.6 in); Turrets & Casemates: 210–280 mm (8.3–11.0 in); Conning tower: 150 mm (5.9 in)

SMS Árpád (Note: "SMS" stands for "Seiner Majestät Schiff ", or "His Majesty's Ship" in German.) was a pre-dreadnought battleship built by the Austro-Hungarian Navy in the early 20th century. She was launched on 11 September 1901 as the second of three Habsburg-class battleships. Along with her sister ships, she participated at the bombardment of Ancona during World War I. Due to a shortage of coal, she was soon decommissioned after the bombardment of Ancona and used as harbor defense ship for the remainder of the war. After the war, all of the Habsburg-class battleships were ceded to Great Britain as war prizes. She was scrapped in Italy in 1921.

== Construction and layout ==
Árpád was the second of three battleships of her class. Her hull was laid down on 10 June 1899 at the Stabilimento Tecnico Triestino shipyard in Trieste. Following more than two years of construction, she was launched on 11 September 1901. After final fitting-out work was finished, Árpád was fully ready for service and commissioned into the Austro-Hungarian Navy on 15 June 1903.

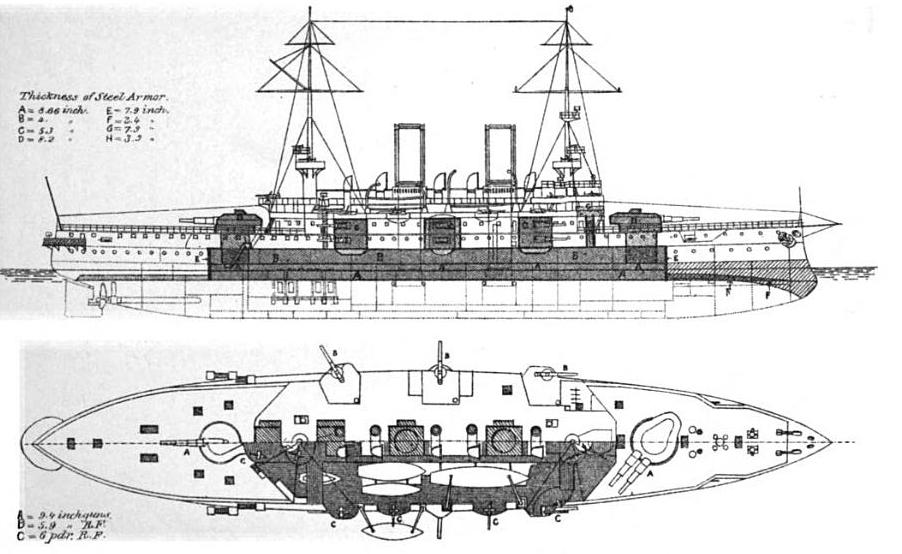
Line-drawing of the Habsburg-class ships; shaded areas show the extent of the armor layout

Like all ships of her class, Árpád was 113.11 m (371 ft 1 in) long at the waterline and was 114.55 m (375 ft 10 in) in overall length. She had a beam of 19.8 m (65 ft 0 in) and a draft of 7.5 m (24 ft 7 in). Freeboard was approximately 5.8 m (19 ft) forward and about 5.5 m (18 ft) aft. She also displaced 8,364 metric tons (8,232 long tons). Once construction on her had finished and she was commissioned into the Navy, Árpád had a crew of 638 officers and enlisted men.

Árpád was powered by 2-shaft, 4-cylinder vertical triple expansion engines, which were supplied with steam by 16 Belleville boilers. Árpád's power output was rated at 14,307 indicated horsepower (10,669 kW), which produced a top speed of 19.65 knots (36.39 km/h; 22.61 mph).

The hull for the ship was constructed from longitudinal and transverse steel frames, over which the outer hull plates were riveted into place. The hull incorporated a double bottom that ran for 63% of the ship's length. A series of watertight bulkheads also extended from the keel to the gun deck. All in all, there was a total of 174 watertight compartments in the ship. Árpád had a metacentric height of between .82 m (2.7 ft) and 1.02 m (3.3 ft). Bilge keels were mounted on either side of the hull to reduce rolling and prevent her from capsizing. Árpád had a flush main deck that was planked with wood, while the upper decks were covered with linoleum or corticine.

Árpád had three 24 cm (9.4 in) L/40 guns, two mounted in a twin turret forward and one mounted in a single turret aft of the main superstructure. The C 97-type guns were manufactured by Krupp in Germany. The main guns fired at a rate of between three and four 215 kg (474 lb) armor-piercing (AP) shells per minute. Her secondary armament consisted of twelve 15 cm (5.9 in) SK L/40 guns in casemates. These guns could fire at 4–5 shells per minute. She was built with face-hardened chrome-nickel steel. The main armored belt was 220 mm (8.7 in) in the central portion of the ship, where the ammunition magazines, machinery spaces, and other critical areas were located. The belt tapered slightly to 180 mm (7.1 in) on either end of the central section.

== Service history ==
=== Peacetime ===
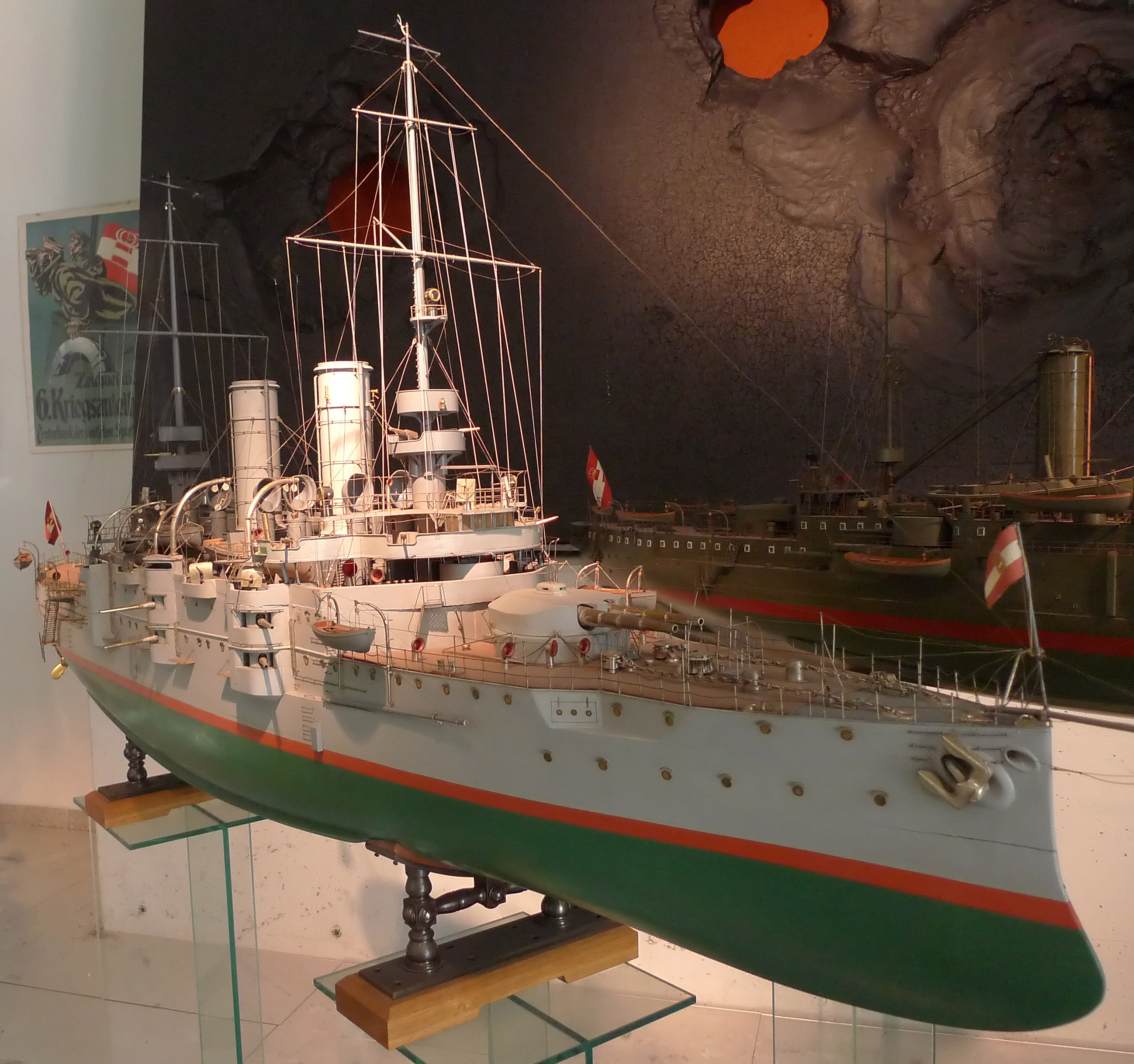
1:50 scale model of Árpád

Árpád took part in her first fleet maneuvers in mid-1903 with her sister ship Habsburg. The third sister, Babenberg, was commissioned in Summer 1904, and participated in successive fleet drills. Following a series of simulated war games pitting Árpád and her sister ships against the three Monarch-class battleships, Árpád and the other two Habsburg-class ships became the I Battleship Division. This new division was active in the Mediterranean region. When Habsburg underwent a training cruise with the three Monarch-class battleships in January 1903, Árpád joined her the next year in a voyage around the Mediterranean Sea. With the commissioning of the Erzherzog Karl-class battleships in 1906 and 1907, the Habsburg-class ships were transferred from the I to the II Battleship Division, and the three Monarch-class battleships were moved from the II to the III Battleship Division. In 1910–1911, Árpád had one of her superstructure decks removed to reduce weight.

=== World War I ===
Early in World War I, Árpád was transferred to the Austro-Hungarian Navy's IV Division after the first new Tegetthoff-class battleships came into service. At around the same time, Árpád, her sister ships Habsburg and Babenberg and the remainder of the Austro-Hungarian Navy were mobilized to support the flight of SMS Goeben and Breslau from 28 July to 10 August 1914. The two German ships were stationed in the Mediterranean and were attempting to break out of the strait of Messina, which was surrounded by British vessels. After breaking out, the German ships planned to steam to Turkey. After the Germans successfully broke out of Messina, the Austro-Hungarian Navy was recalled. The fleet had by that time advanced as far south as Brindisi in southeastern coast of Italy. After Italy entered the war on the side of France and Great Britain, the Austro-Hungarian Navy bombarded several Italian port cities along the Adriatic coast. Árpád took part in the Bombardment of Ancona on 23 May 1915.

Due to a coal shortage, Árpád was later decommissioned and re-purposed as a harbor defense ship for the latter half of the war. Árpád's crew was transferred to man the new U-boats and aircraft. Following the war, Árpád, along with her sister ships, were awarded to Great Britain as war prizes. They were sold to Italy and broken up for scrap in 1921.
