= Jezerane =

Coordinates: 45°03′N 15°12′E

- Village
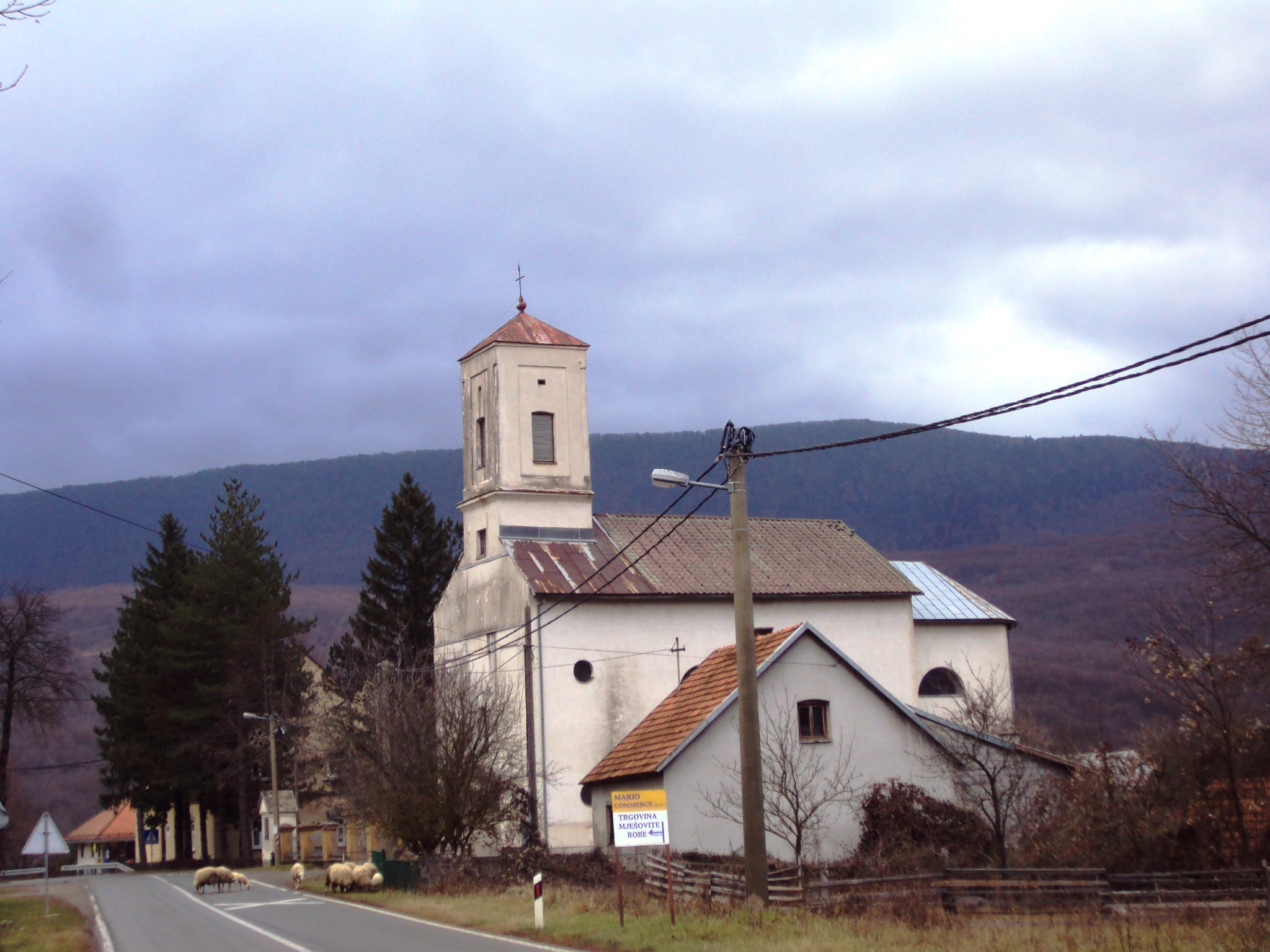
- Interactive map of Jezerane
- Country: Croatia
- Region: Lika
- County: Lika-Senj
- Municipality: Brinje

Area
  - Total: 39.6 km^{2} (15.3 sq mi)

Population (2021)
  - Total: 270
  - Density: 6.8/km^{2} (18/sq mi)
- Time zone: UTC+1 (CET)
  - Summer (DST): UTC+2 (CEST)

Jezerane is a village in central Croatia, in the municipality of Brinje, in the northwestern part of Lika-Senj County. It is connected by the D23 highway.

== Bibliography ==
- Fras, Franz Julius (1835). "Jesseraner-Kompagnie" [Jezerane Company]. Vollständige Topographie der Karlstädter-Militärgrenze mit besonderer Rücksicht auf die Beschreibung der Schlösser, Ruinen, Inscriptionen und andern dergleichen Ueberbleibseln von Antiquitäten: nach Anschauung und aus den zuverlässigsten Quellen dargestellt für reisende, und zur Förderung der Vaterlandsliebe (in German). Zagreb: Franz Suppan. pp. 289–290.
