= Monarch-class coastal defense ship =

Austro-Hungarian Navy's Monarch-class of coastal defense ships

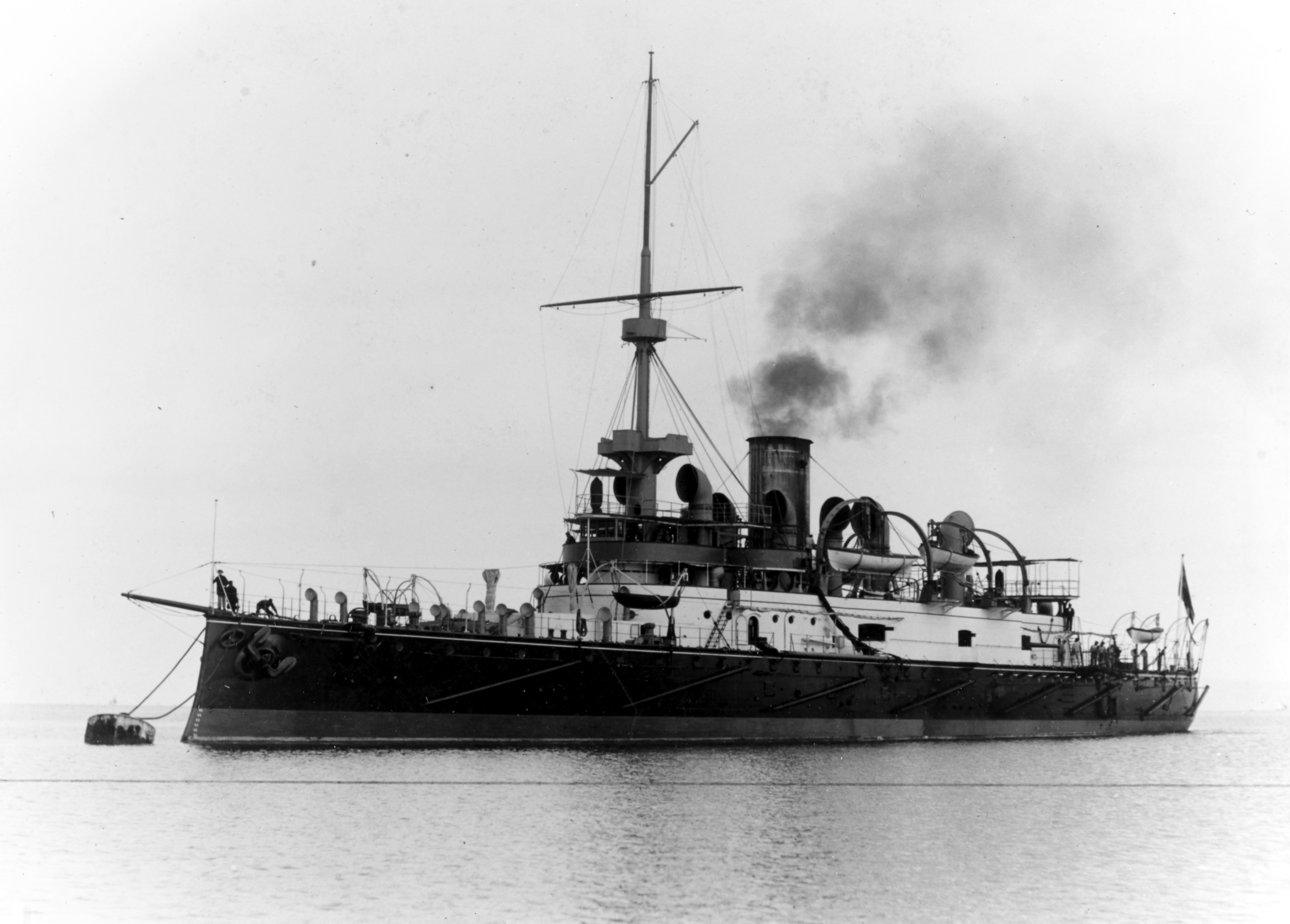
- SMS Wien circa 1898

Class overview
- Name: Monarch class
- Builders: Stabilimento Tecnico Triestino; Marinearsenal Pola
- Operators: Austro-Hungarian Navy
- Preceded by: SMS Kronprinzessin Erzherzogin Stephanie
- Succeeded by: Habsburg-class battleship
- Built: 1893–1896
- In commission: 1895–1920
- Completed: 3
- Lost: 1
- Scrapped: 2

General characteristics
- Type: Coastal defense ship
- Displacement: 5,878 tonnes (5,785 long tons)
- Length: 99.22 m (325.5 ft)
- Beam: 17 m (55 ft 9 in)
- Draught: 6.6 m (22 ft)
- Propulsion: 12 coal-fired Belleville boilers without economizers outputting 9,180 hp (6,846 kW) (for Budapest only); coal-fired cylindrical boilers (Wien and Monarch); inverted vertical triple expansion engines outputting 8,500 hp (6,338 kW)
- Speed: 15.5 knots (28.7 km/h; 17.8 mph) (Monarch and Wien); 17.5 knots (32.4 km/h; 20.1 mph) (Budapest)
- Range: 2,200 nmi (4,100 km)
- Complement: 469
- Armament: 4 × 240 mm (9.4 in) guns; 6 × 150 mm (5.9 in) guns; 1 × 7 cm (2.8 in) anti-aircraft gun; 2 × 66 mm (2.6 in) L/18 landing guns; 10 × 47 mm (1.9 in) guns; 4 × 47 mm (1.9 in) guns; 1 × 8 mm (0.31 in) MG; 2 × torpedo tubes
- Armour: Belt: 270 mm (11 in); Turrets: 203 mm (8.0 in); Conning tower: 220 mm (8.7 in); Deck: 60 mm (2.4 in)

The Monarch class was a class of three coastal defense ships built by Austria-Hungary at the end of the 19th century. The Monarchs were the first ships of their type to utilize turrets. The class comprised three ships: SMS Monarch, SMS Wien, and SMS Budapest, each armed with four 240 mm (9 in) L/40 guns in two turrets and capable of 15.5 knots (28.7 km/h; 17.8 mph) at full speed. Budapest was fitted with slightly more modern and powerful engines, giving her a top speed of 17.5 knots (32.4 km/h; 20.1 mph).

Monarch was launched on 9 May 1895, Wien on 7 July 1895, and Budapest just over a year later on 24 July 1896. The ships saw very little service during World War I in the V Division of the Austro-Hungarian fleet. Budapest and Wien took part in the bombardment of Italian positions along the Adriatic coast in 1915 and 1917, but the three battleships went largely inactive for the remainder of war.

In 1917, Wien was struck by Italian torpedoes and sank in her home port of Trieste. The remaining two ships were ceded to Great Britain following the end of the war and were scrapped between 1920 and 1922.

== Construction ==
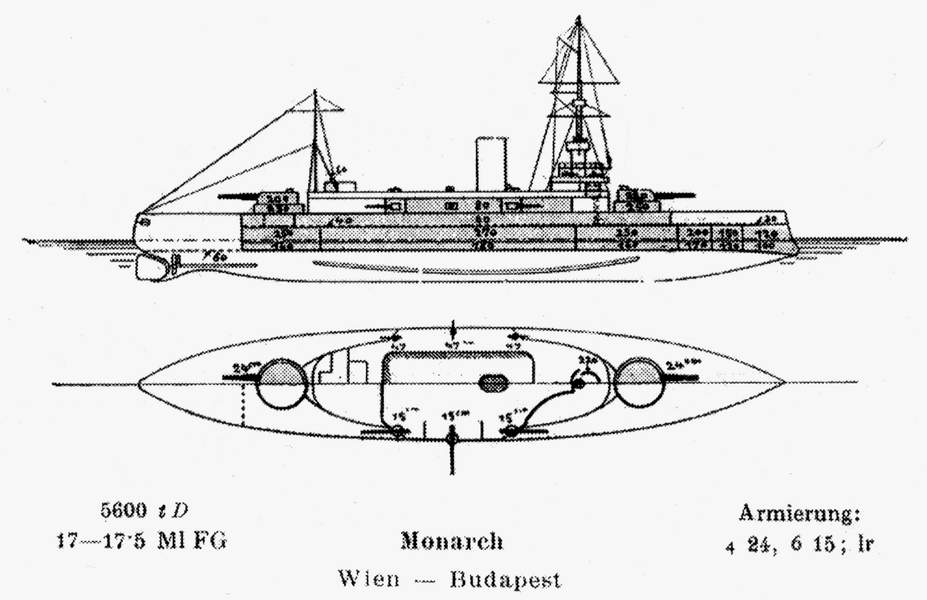
Right elevation and plan of the Monarch-class coastal defense ships

In the 1890s the Austro-Hungarian Navy consisted of two obsolescent ironclads, SMS Kronprinz Erzherzog Rudolf and SMS Kronprinzessin Erzherzogin Stephanie. By 1893, sufficient funds were available to build three replacement ships, but the Hungarian and Austrian parliaments authorized only the construction of a smaller class of coastal defense ships, as Austro-Hungarian naval policy at that time was primarily concerned with coastal defense. The three new ships—Budapest, Wien, and Monarch—weighed about 5,600 tonnes (5,512 long tons), half the size of the battleships of other navies. Budapest was fitted with more powerful engines than her sister ships, giving her a higher top speed. Budapest and Wien were built in the Stabilimento Tecnico Triestino yards in Trieste, and Monarch was constructed at the Naval Arsenal in Pula.

The first ship of the class, Wien, was laid down on 16 February 1893. She was launched on 7 July 1895, about a month after Monarch. Despite this, Wien was the first ship of the new class to be commissioned into the Austro-Hungarian Navy, on 13 May 1897. The second ship of the class, Monarch, was laid down on 31 July 1893, launched on 9 May 1895, and was commissioned into the Austro-Hungarian Navy on 11 May 1898. Budapest was the third and final ship of the class. She was laid down on the same day as Wien, on 16 February 1893, and launched from the Naval Arsenal in Pula on 24 July 1896. She was commissioned on 12 May 1898, a day after Monarch.

== Design ==
=== Armament and armor ===
The members of the Monarch class displaced 5,878 tonnes (5,785 long tons). Their armament consisted of four 240 mm (9.4 in) L/40 guns with two guns in each of the two turrets, six 150 mm (5.9 in) L/40 guns, 10 47 mm (1.9 in) L/44 guns, four 47 mm (1.9 in) L/33 guns, one 8 mm (0.31 in) MG gun, and two torpedo tubes. A single Škoda 7 cm K10 anti-aircraft gun was installed on SMS Budapest and SMS Wien in 1917, while SMS Monarch received one of the earlier Škoda 66 mm (2.6 in) L/45 BAG anti-aircraft guns.

Ships of the Monarch class were fitted with Harvey armour throughout. Their belt armor was 270 mm (11 in) thick except for the turrets, which had 203 mm (8 in). The conning tower was protected by armor 220 mm (8.7 in) thick, and the deck by 64 mm (2.5 in); the redoubt and casemates had 76 mm (3 in) of armor.

=== Propulsion and crew ===
Monarch-class ships normally carried 300 tons of coal, but could hold up to 500 tons. Budapest was fitted with 12 coal-fired Belleville boilers without economizers, giving an output of 9,180 hp (6,846 kW). Wien and Monarch had coal-fired cylindrical boilers and vertical triple expansion engines with an output of 8,500 indicated horsepower (6,338 kW). Wien and Monarch had a maximum speed of 15.5 knots (28.7 km/h; 17.8 mph), compared to Budapest's top speed of 17.5 knots (32.4 km/h; 20.1 mph). Each ship was manned by 26 officers and 397 crewmen, a total of 423 personnel per ship.

== Service history ==
=== Peace time ===
The battleship Monarch before World War I

Upon being commissioned into the Austro-Hungarian Navy, the three ships of the Monarch class were used for a variety of purposes. All three ships of the Monarch class partook in a cruise around the Adriatic and Aegean in 1899, to display the Austro-Hungarian flag in foreign waters. The Monarch class formed the I Battleship Division of the Austro-Hungarian Navy. The battleship Wien participated in the Diamond Jubilee of the crowning of Queen Victoria in 1897, as well as the international blockade off Crete during the Greco-Turkish War of 1897.

However, less than five years after their completion, the Monarch-class battleships were rendered obsolete by the newly commissioned Habsburg class. The newly completed SMS Habsburg conducted a training cruise with the three Monarch-class battleships in January 1903; they were joined by SMS Árpád the following year. During the 1904 training exercises, the three Habsburg-class battleships engaged the three Monarchs in simulated combat; the maneuver marked the first time two homogeneous squadrons consisting of modern battleships operated in the Austro-Hungarian Navy. The three Habsburg-class ships took over the position of the I Division while the Monarchs formed the newly created II Division. With other new classes of pre-dreadnoughts being built such as the Erzherzog Karl class, and later the Radetzky class, the Monarchs were demoted even further, and ended up in the V Battleship Division. They were serving as coastal defense ships by the beginning of World War I.

=== World War I ===
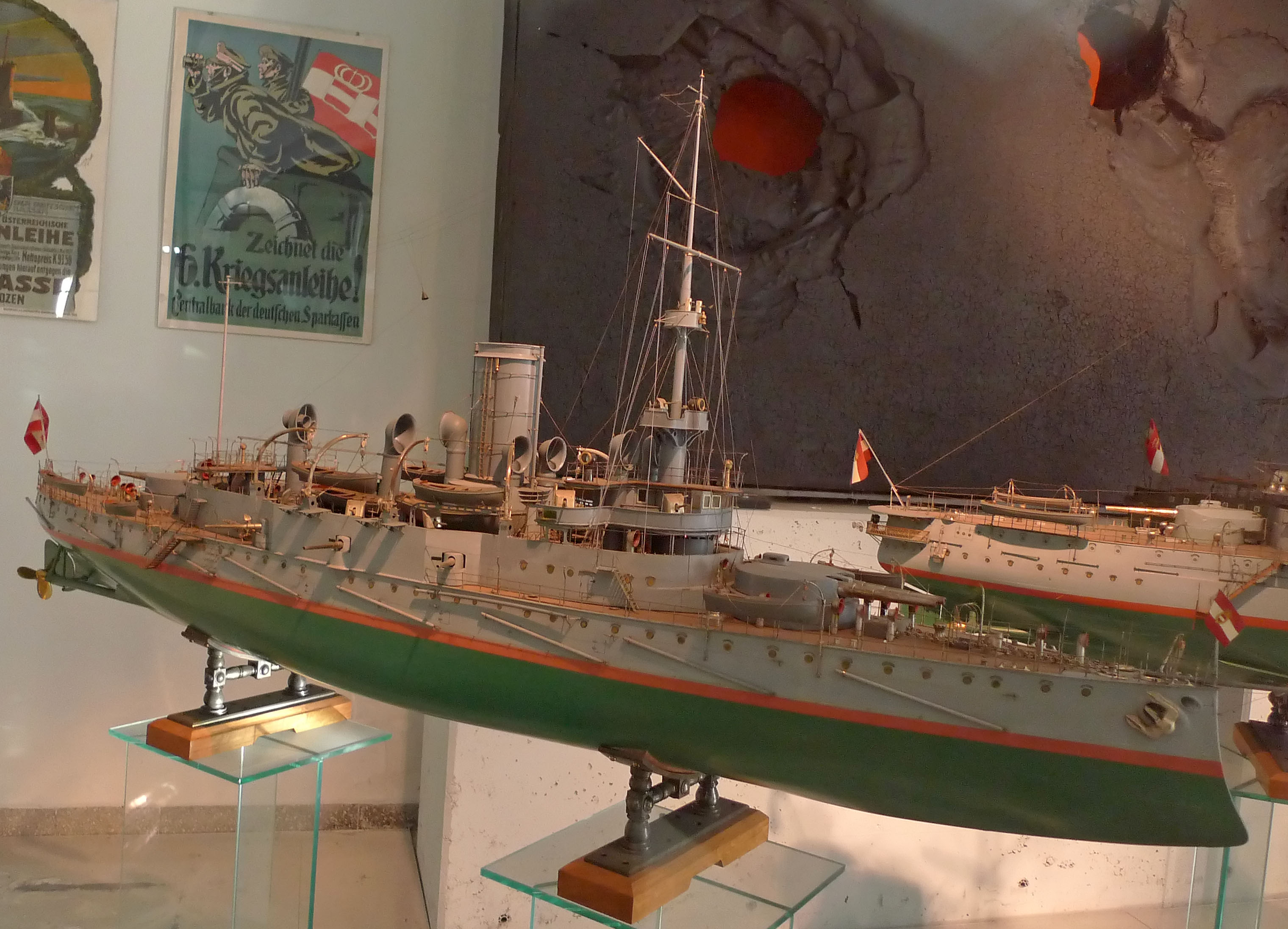
A 1:50 scale model of the battleship Budapest

At the outbreak of World War I in July 1914, the three ships of the Monarch class were serving as the V Battleship Division, deployed as coastal defense ships. They also served as training ships, and were used to bombard coastal positions during the early years of the war. In August 1914, Budapest was transferred from Pula to Cattaro to shell Mount Lovcen. On 9 August 1914 Monarch shelled the French radio station at Budva. She also bombarded the Montenegrin radio station off Bar on 17 August and another station off Volovica Point on 19 August where she attacked the local radio station and barracks. Following these operations, Monarch served as a harbor defense ship. On 28–29 December 1915 Budapest supported the cruisers and destroyers of the Austro-Hungarian Navy that were to raid Durazzo, but the detachment returned to port without having opened fire on the enemy. On 9 January 1916, Budapest again bombarded the fortifications on Mount Lovcen, and helped to capture the enemy-held mountain. In late 1917 Budapest and Wien were sent to Trieste, and participated in shelling Italian troops in the Gulf of Trieste. On 10 December 1917, two Italian torpedo boats managed to penetrate the port of Trieste undetected, and fired torpedoes at the battleships Budapest and Wien. The torpedo fired at Budapest missed, but Wien was hit twice and sank in less than five minutes in the shallow water of the Trieste harbor. Forty-six men serving on Wien were killed in the attack. Budapest was subsequently given the task that Monarch had been performing for over three years, and was demoted to a floating barrack for German U-boat crews. In June 1918 Budapest was renovated and had a 380 mm (15 in) L/17 howitzer installed in her bow to use for coastal bombardment, but she never saw action with the new gun in place. At the end of the war in 1918, the remaining Monarch-class battleships, Budapest and Monarch, were handed over to Great Britain as war reparations. In 1920 the two ships were sold for scrap to Italy, and were broken up between 1920 and 1922.
