= SMS Habsburg =

Austro-Hungarian Navy's Habsburg-class pre-dreadnought battleship

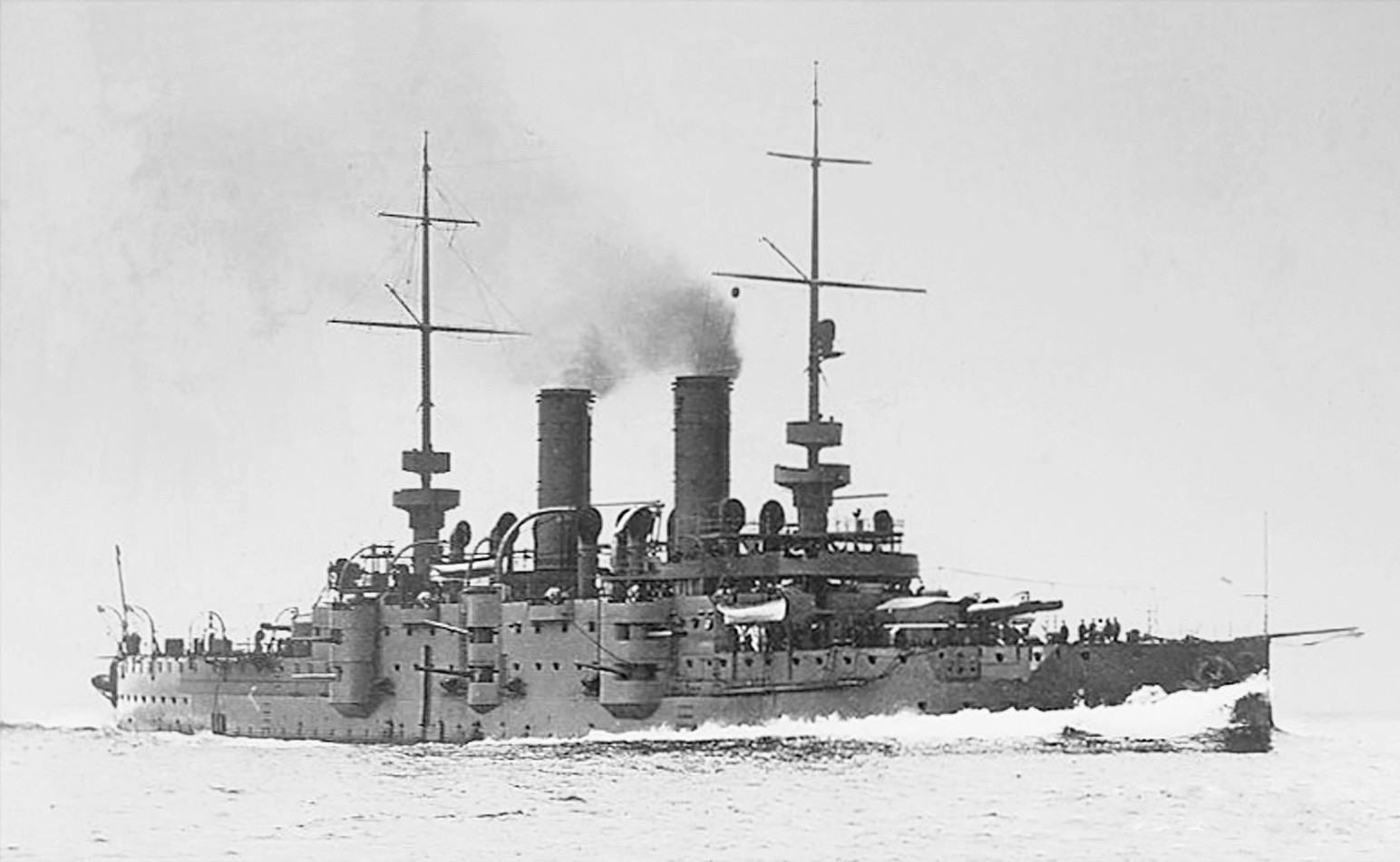
- A member of the Habsburg class

History

Austria-Hungary
- Namesake: House of Habsburg
- Builder: Stabilimento Tecnico Triestino
- Laid down: 13 March 1899
- Launched: 9 September 1900
- Completed: 31 December 1902
- Fate: Scrapped, 1921

General characteristics
- Class & type: Habsburg-class pre-dreadnought battleship
- Displacement: 8,232 long tons (8,364 t); 8,823 long tons (8,965 t) full load
- Length: 375 ft 10 in (114.6 m)
- Beam: 65 ft (19.8 m)
- Draft: 24 ft 6 in (7.5 m)
- Installed power: 15,063 ihp (11,232 kW)
- Propulsion: 2 shafts, 4-cylinder vertical triple expansion steam engines, 16 Belleville boilers
- Speed: 19.62 knots (36.34 km/h; 22.58 mph)
- Range: 6670km(3600nm) at 10 knots
- Complement: 638
- Armament: 3 × 24 cm (9.4 in)/40 cal. Krupp C97 guns; 12 × 15 cm (5.9 in)/40 Krupp C96 guns; 10 × 6.6-centimeter (2.6 in)/45 cal Skoda guns; 6 × 47 mm (1.9 in)/44 cal Skoda QF guns; 2 × 4.7-cm/33 cal Skoda QF guns; 2 × 45-centimeter (17.7 in) torpedo tubes
- Armor: Waterline belt: 180–220 mm (7.1–8.7 in); Deck: 40 mm (1.6 in); Turrets & Casemates: 210–280 mm (8.3–11.0 in); Conning tower: 150 mm (5.9 in)

SMS Habsburg (Note: "SMS" stands for "Seiner Majestät Schiff ", or "His Majesty's Ship" in German.) was a pre-dreadnought battleship built by the Austro-Hungarian Navy in 1899. The lead ship of the Habsburg class was launched on 9 September 1900. In 1903 and 1904, Habsburg and her sister ship Árpád conducted training exercises in the Mediterranean Sea. In 1906 and 1907, Habsburg was transferred to the III Battleship Division. One of her superstructure decks was removed to reduce weight and to modernize the vessel in 1910.

For most of World War I, Habsburg remained in her home port of Pula, in present-day Croatia except for two engagements. In 1914, she was part of the Austro-Hungarian flotilla sent to protect the escape of the German ships SMS Goeben and SMS Breslau from the British-held Mediterranean; she advanced as far as Brindisi before being recalled to her home port. Her sole combat engagement occurred in late May 1915, when she participated in the bombardment of the Italian port city of Ancona. After the war, Habsburg was awarded to the British as a war prize. She was scrapped in 1921 in Italy.

== Construction and layout ==
Habsburg was the first of three battleships of her class. Her hull was laid down on 13 March 1899 at the Stabilimento Tecnico Triestino shipyard in Trieste. The vessel was from the design of Siegfried Popper, and she was constructed under the direction of Gustav von Lendecke. Following a year and a half of construction, she was launched on 9 September 1900. After the completion of final fitting-out work, Habsburg was commissioned into the Austro-Hungarian fleet on 31 December 1902.

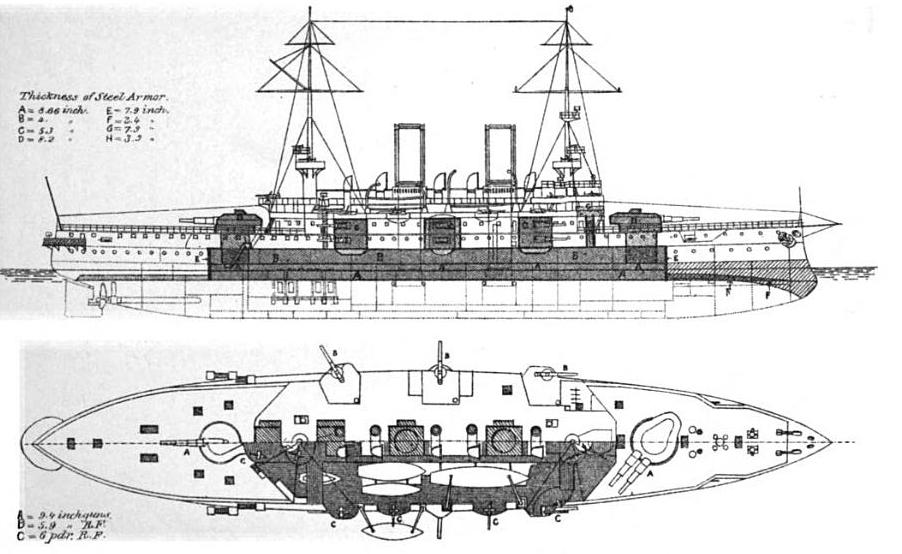
Line-drawing of the Habsburg-class ships; shaded areas show the extent of the armor layout

Like all ships of her class, Habsburg was 113.11 m (371 ft) long at the waterline and was 114.55 m (375 ft 10 in) in overall length. She had a beam of 19.8 m (65 ft) and a draft of 7.5 m (24 ft 6 in). The ship displaced 8,364 metric tons (8,232 long tons). Habsburg had a crew of 638 officers and enlisted men.

Habsburg was powered by 2-shaft, 4-cylinder vertical triple expansion engines, which were supplied with steam by 16 Belleville boilers. Habsburg's power output was rated at 15,063 indicated horsepower (ihp), which produced a top speed of 19.62 knots (36.34 km/h; 22.58 mph).

The ship's hull was constructed from longitudinal and transverse steel frames, over which the outer hull plates were riveted into place. The hull incorporated a double bottom that ran for 63 percent of the ship's length. A series of watertight bulkheads also extended from the keel to the gun deck. There were a total of 174 watertight compartments in the ship. Habsburg had a metacentric height of between .82 m (2.7 ft) and 1.02 m (3.3 ft). Bilge keels mounted on either side of the hull reduced rolling. She had a flush main deck that was planked with wood; the upper decks were covered with linoleum or corticine.

Habsburg had three 24 cm (9.4 in) L/40 guns, two mounted in a twin turret forward and one mounted in a single turret aft of the main superstructure. The C 97 guns were manufactured by Krupp in Germany. Her secondary armament consisted of twelve 15 cm (5.9 in) SK L/40 guns in casemates. These guns could fire at 4–5 shells per minute. Habsburg was built with face-hardened chrome-nickel steel. The main armored belt was 220 mm (8.7 in) in the central portion of the ship, where the ammunition magazines, machinery spaces, and other critical areas were located. The belt tapered slightly to 180 mm (7.1 in) on either end of the central section.

== Service history ==
=== Peacetime ===
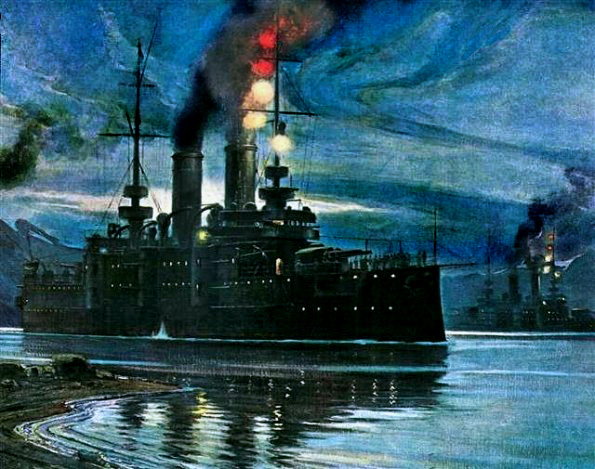
A painting by Alexander Kircher showing SMS Habsburg and a sister ship traveling at night.

Habsburg and her sister, Árpád, took part in their first fleet maneuvers in mid-1903. By the summer of 1904, a third ship, Babenberg, was commissioned and participated in successive fleet drills. During the 1904 training exercises, the three Habsburg-class battleships engaged the three Monarch-class battleships in a simulated war game. The maneuvers also marked the first time the Austro-Hungarian navy had two squadrons of modern battleships. Following these maneuvers, the Habsburg-class ships were formed into the I Battleship Division. With her sisters, Habsburg was also active in the Mediterranean Sea. Habsburg underwent a training cruise with the three Monarch-class battleships in January 1903. Árpád joined the training cruise in 1904. With the commissioning of the Erzherzog Karl-class battleships in 1906 and 1907, the three Habsburg-class ships were transferred to the II Division and the three Monarchs formed the III Division.

In 1910 Habsburg was extensively modernized and lightened: one of her superstructure decks removed to reduce weight. In 1911, her sister ship, Árpád underwent the same renovations. Following these renovations, Habsburg and her sister ships were converted to coastal defense vessels.

=== World War I ===
In late July and August 1914, Habsburg served as the flagship of the III Battleship Division of the Austro-Hungarian navy, under the command of Captain Miklós Horthy. The battleship, along with her sister ships and the rest of the Austro-Hungarian Navy, were mobilized to support the flight of SMS Goeben and SMS Breslau from 28 July to 10 August 1914. The two German cruisers were stationed in the Mediterranean Sea and were attempting to break out of the strait of Messina, which was surrounded by British troops and vessels, and make their way to Turkey. After the Germans successfully escaped the strait, the Austro-Hungarian Navy was recalled. The fleet had advanced as far south as Brindisi in southeastern Italy.

Following the flight of SMS Goeben and SMS Breslau, Habsburg was transferred to the IV Division along with her sisters when the first new Tegetthoff-class battleships came into service in 1912. After Italy entered World War I on the side of France and Great Britain, the Austro-Hungarian Navy bombarded several Italian port cities along the Adriatic coast. Habsburg took part in the bombardment of Ancona on 23 May 1915. During the attack on the Italian port city, Habsburg bombarded the town's train station, the St. Stefano military camp and Ancona coastal batteries. The bombardment of Ancona was Habsburg's only combat operation.

Following the bombardment, Habsburg and her sister ships traveled back to their port city of Pula. Due to a shortage of coal, they remained there for the remainder of the war. For the latter half of the war, Habsburg was decommissioned and re-purposed as a harbor defense vessel. Her crew was transferred to the new U-boats and aircraft. In 1918, she was re-commissioned as a training ship for the Austrian Naval Academy. Following the war, the Habsburg was awarded to Great Britain as a war prize. She was instead sold to Italy and broken up for scrap in 1921.
