= Habsburg-class battleship =

Pre-dreadnought class in Austria-Hungary

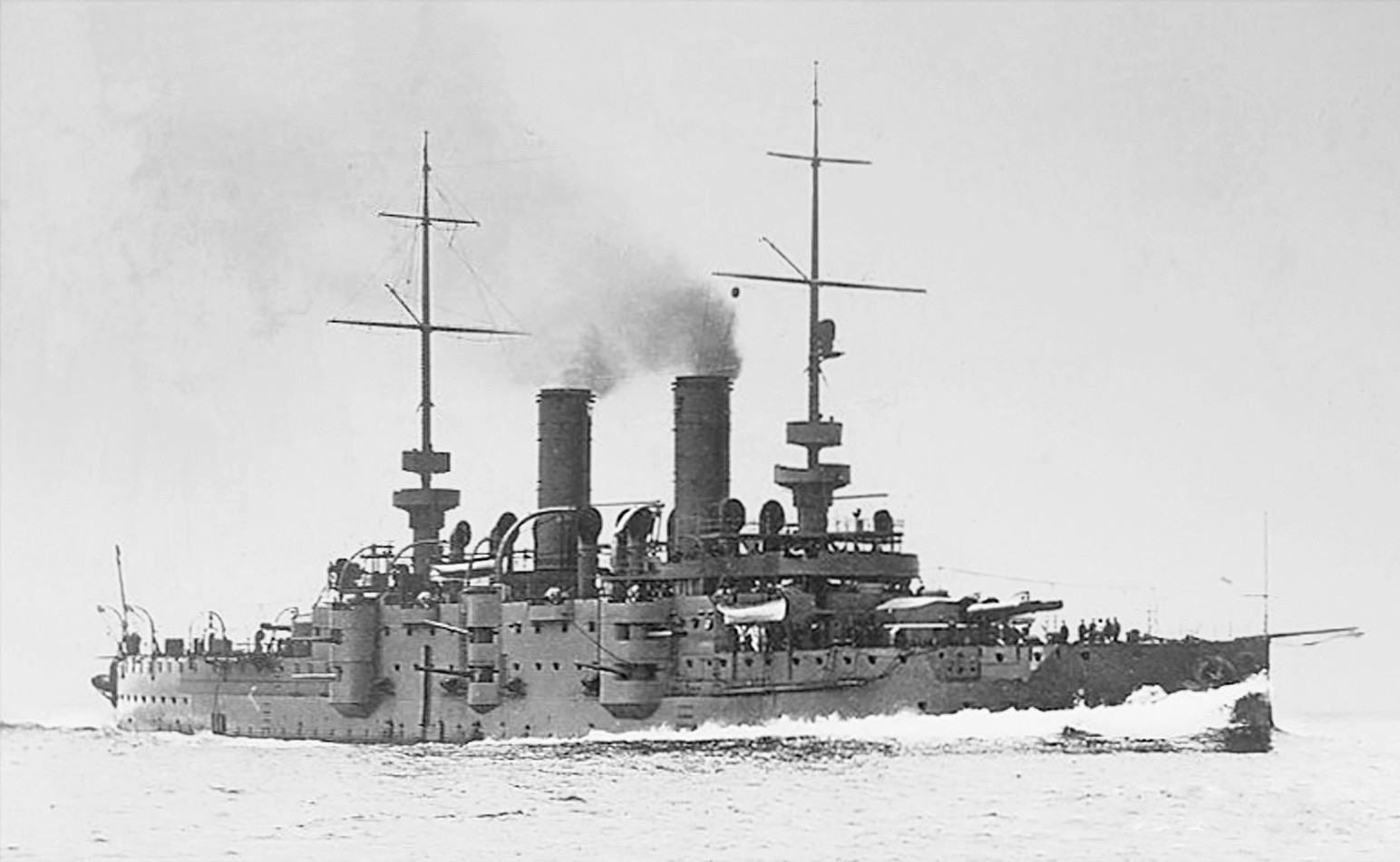
- A ship of the Habsburg class

Class overview
- Name: Habsburg class
- Operators: Austro-Hungarian Navy
- Preceded by: Monarch-class coastal defense ship
- Succeeded by: Erzherzog Karl class
- In commission: 1900–1921
- Completed: 3
- Scrapped: 3

General characteristics
- Type: Pre-dreadnought battleship
- Displacement: 8,232 long tons (8,364 t); 8,823 long tons (8,965 t) full load
- Length: 375 ft 10 in (114.6 m)
- Beam: 65 ft (19.8 m)
- Draft: 24 ft 6 in (7.5 m)
- Installed power: 15,063 ihp (11,232 kW)
- Propulsion: 2 shafts; 4-cylinder vertical triple expansion steam engines; 16 Belleville boilers
- Speed: 19 knots (35 km/h; 22 mph)
- Complement: 638
- Armament: 3 × 24 cm (9.4 in)/40 Krupp C97 guns; 12 × 15 cm (5.9 in)/40 Krupp C96 guns; 10 × 66 mm (2.6 in) L/45 Skoda guns; 6 × 47 mm (1.9 in) L/44 Skoda QF guns; 2 × 4.7 cm L/33 cal Skoda QF guns; 2 × 45 cm (17.7 in) torpedo tubes
- Armor: Waterline belt: 180–220 mm (7.1–8.7 in); Deck: 40 mm (1.6 in); Turrets & Casemates: 210–280 mm (8.3–11.0 in); Conning tower: 150 mm (5.9 in)

The Habsburg class was a group of pre-dreadnought battleships built by Austria-Hungary at the turn of the 20th century. They were the first sea-going battleships built by Austria-Hungary since the central battery ship Tegetthoff in 1876. The class was composed of three ships: Habsburg, Árpád, and Babenberg. They were armed with three 24 cm (9.4 in) guns in two turrets and were capable of slightly better than 19.5 knots (36.1 km/h; 22.4 mph) at full speed. Habsburg and Árpád were modernized in 1910–11.

Habsburg was launched on 9 September 1900, Árpád just over a year later on 11 September 1901, and Babenberg on 4 October 1902. The ships saw limited service during World War I in the IV Division of the Austro-Hungarian fleet. Babenberg and Árpád bombarded the Italian port of Ancona in 1915, but the three battleships were largely inactive for the remainder of their service. They were decommissioned in 1916 to free up the majority of their crews for service in the submarine and air forces. All three ships were ultimately ceded to Great Britain following the end of the war; they were sold to Italian ship-breakers and scrapped in 1921.

== Design ==
=== General characteristics and machinery ===
The ships of the Habsburg class were 113.11 m (371 ft) long at the waterline and 114.55 m (375 ft 10 in) long overall. They had a beam of 19.8 m (65 ft) and a draft of 7.5 m (24 ft 6 in). Freeboard was approximately 5.80 m (19.0 ft) forward and about 5.50 m (18.0 ft) aft. They displaced 8,364 metric tons (8,232 long tons). The ships had a crew of 638 officers and enlisted men. The ships had a flush main deck that was planked with wood, while the upper decks were covered with linoleum or corticine.

The hulls for each ship were constructed from transverse and longitudinal steel frames, over which the outer hull plates were riveted. The hull incorporated a double bottom that ran for 63% of its length. A series of watertight bulkheads extended from the keel to the gun deck; there were a total of 174 watertight compartments in each ship. The ships had a metacentric height of between .82 m (2.7 ft) and 1.02 m (3.3 ft). Bilge keels were mounted on either side of the hull to reduce rolling.

Their machinery system consisted of 2-shaft 4-cylinder vertical triple expansion engines. They were supplied with steam by 16 Belleville boilers. Habsburg's powerplant was rated at 15,063 indicated horsepower (11,232 kW), which produced a top speed of 19.62 knots (36.34 km/h; 22.58 mph). Árpád's system was slightly less efficient, at 14,307 ihp (10,669 kW), though it achieved a comparable speed of 19.65 knots (36.39 km/h; 22.61 mph) on trials. Babenberg had the most powerful engines of the three, which ran at 16,000 ihp (12,000 kW) and provided a top speed of 19.85 knots (36.76 km/h; 22.84 mph).

=== Armament ===
The ships' primary armament was three 24 cm (9.4 in) L/40 guns, with two mounted in a twin turret forward and one mounted in a single turret aft of the main superstructure. The guns were manufactured by Krupp in Germany, and were the C 97 type.

Secondary armament included twelve 15 cm (5.9 in) SK L/40 guns in casemates. They were mounted in an unusual arrangement: there were two decks of three guns each on either side amidships. These guns could fire armor-piercing shells at a rate of 4–5 per minute. The guns could depress to −7 degrees and elevate to 20 degrees, for a maximum range of 13,700 metres (15,000 yd). They were manually elevated and trained.

The ships carried a wide array of smaller weapons, for defense against torpedo boats. These included ten 66 mm (2.6 in) L/45 guns, six 47 mm (1.9 in) L/44 quick-firing (QF) guns, and two 4.7 cm (1.9 in) L/33 QF guns. All of these guns were emplaced in single mounts, either on the upper decks and superstructure, or in casemates at the bow and stern. With the exception of the main battery 24 cm weapons, all of the guns carried on the ships were manufactured by Škoda Works in Pilsen. The ships also carried two Whitehead 45 cm (17.7 in) submerged torpedo tubes.

=== Armor ===
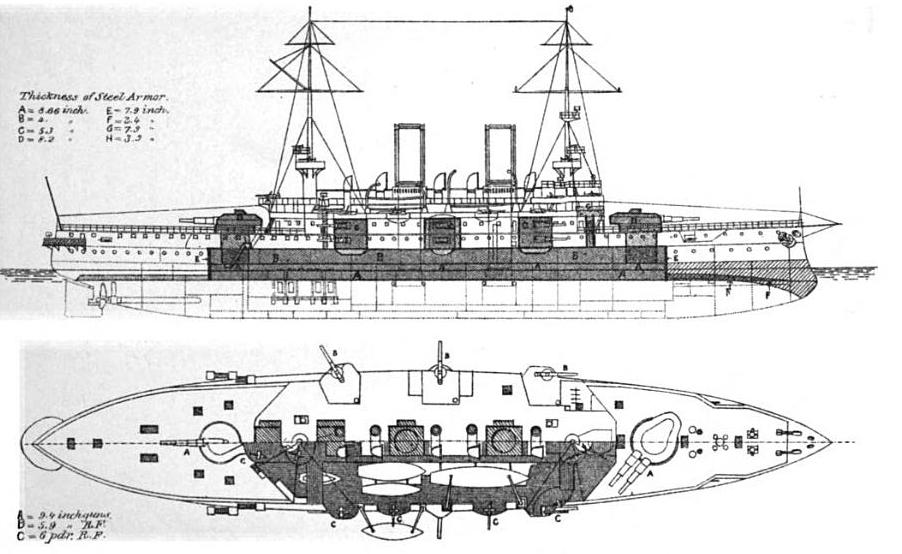
Line-drawing of the Habsburg-class ships; shaded areas show the extent of the armor layout

Habsburg and her sisters were protected by face-hardened chrome-nickel steel. The main armored belt was 220 mm (8.7 in) in the central portion of each ship, where the ammunition magazines, machinery spaces, and other critical areas were located. The belt tapered slightly to 180 mm (7.1 in) on either end of the central section. Past the barbettes, the hull was protected by about 50 mm (2 in) of armor plate, up to the bow and stern. The entire belt, including the thinner portions forward and aft of the main battery barbettes, extended for 1.30 m (4.3 ft) below the waterline and 1.06 m (3.5 ft) above. The belt was widened at the bow to cover the ram. Side protection was supplemented by 100 mm (3.9 in) thick armor above the main belt; this section of armor extended up to meet the gun deck. The armored deck was 40 mm (1.6 in) thick.

The main battery turrets were protected by armor plate that was 210 mm (8.3 in) thick on the sides and faces of the gun mounts. The armored barbettes that held the turrets, working chambers, and shell rooms were protected with 183 mm (7.2 in) of armor. The casemates for the 15 cm guns were 137 mm (5.4 in) on the outboard side and 88 mm (3.5 in) on the less vulnerable inboard side. The forward conning tower was armored with sides that were 200 mm (7.9 in) thick and contained a 150 mm (5.9 in) thick communications tube; the aft conning tower was less well-protected. Its sides were 100 mm thick, and its communication tube was only 50 mm thick.

== Construction ==
Habsburg was laid down at the Stabilimento Tecnico Triestino shipyard in Trieste on 13 March 1899. She was launched on 9 September 1900, after which fitting-out work was conducted. The ship was finally finished by December 1902; she was commissioned into the Austro-Hungarian fleet on the 31st of that month. Árpád followed Habsburg three months later; she was laid down at the STT shipyard on 10 June 1899 and launched on 11 September 1901. She was commissioned into the fleet on 15 June 1903. Babenberg, the last ship of the three, was laid down at the STT dockyard on 19 January 1901. She was launched on 4 October 1902 and completed on 15 April 1904, when she joined her sisters in the fleet.

== Ships ==
Construction data
Name	Builder	Laid down	Launched	Completed	Fate
Habsburg	Stabilimento Tecnico Triestino, Trieste	13 March 1899	9 September 1900	31 December 1902	Sold for scrap, 1921
Árpád	Stabilimento Tecnico Triestino, Trieste	10 June 1899	11 September 1901	15 June 1903	Sold for scrap, 1921
Babenberg	Stabilimento Tecnico Triestino, Trieste	19 January 1901	4 October 1902	15 April 1904	Sold for scrap, 1921

== Service history ==
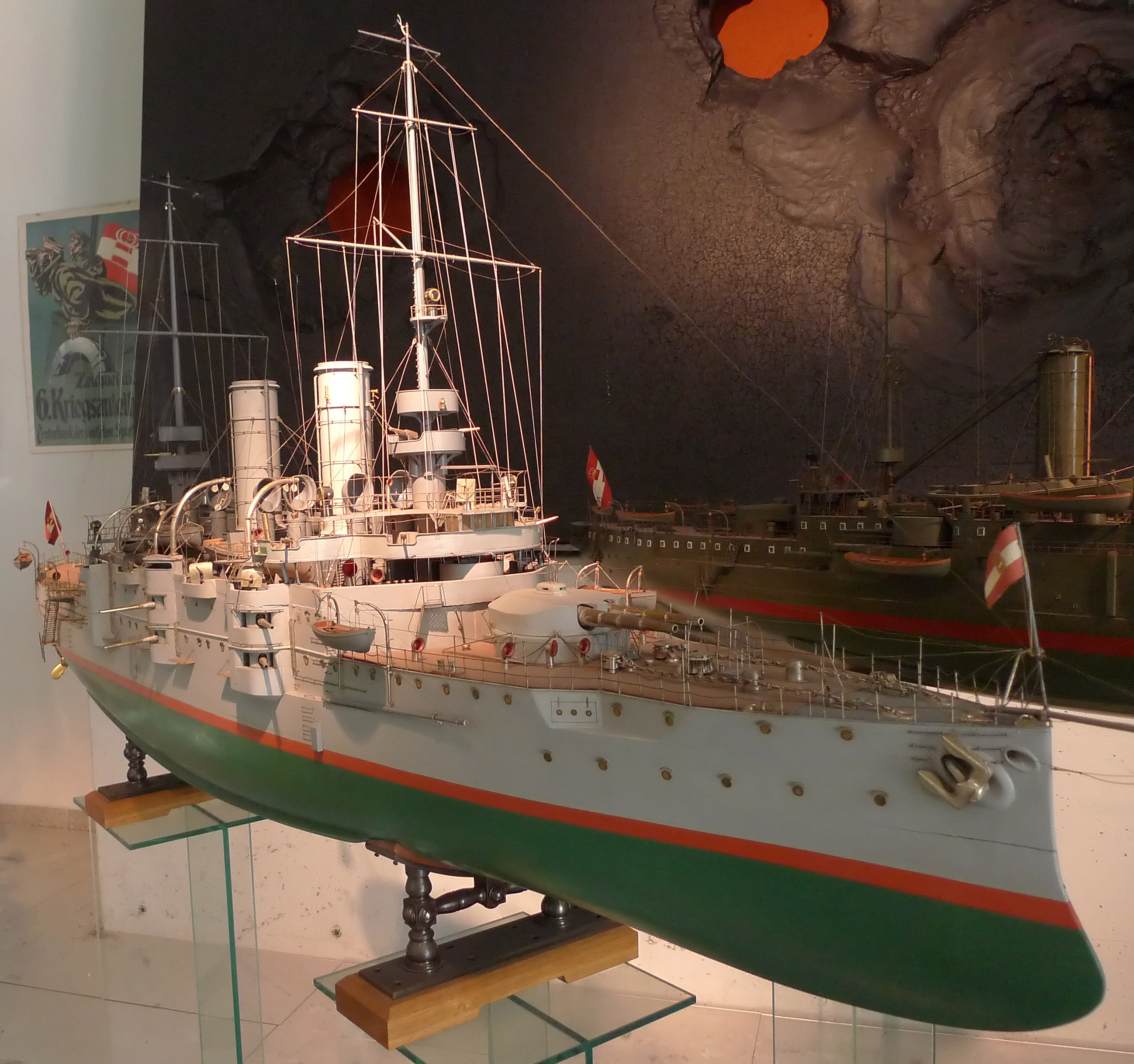
A 1:50 scale model of SMS Árpád

=== Peacetime ===
Habsburg and Árpád took part in their first fleet maneuvers in mid 1903. By the following summer, Babenberg was ready for active service, and she too participated in fleet drills. During the 1904 training exercises, the three Habsburgs engaged the three Monarch-class battleships in simulated combat; the maneuver marked the first time two homogeneous squadrons consisting of modern battleships operated in the Austro-Hungarian navy. The three Habsburg-class ships formed the I Division while the Monarchs formed the II Division. The ships were also active in the Mediterranean. Habsburg conducted a training cruise with the three Monarch-class battleships in January 1903. She was joined by Árpád the following year. With the commissioning of the Erzherzog Karl-class battleships in 1906–1907, the three Habsburg-class ships were transferred to the II Division, and the three Monarchs went to the III Division.

=== World War I ===
At the outbreak of World War I in late July 1914, Habsburg was serving as the flagship of the III Battleship Division of the Austro-Hungarian fleet, under the command of Captain Miklós Horthy, alongside her two sisters. They were later transferred to the IV Division after the new Tegetthoff-class battleships came into service. At around the same time, she was mobilized along with her sister ships Árpád and Babenberg and the remainder of the Austro-Hungarian Navy to support the flight of SMS Goeben and Breslau. The two German ships were stationed in the Mediterranean and were attempting to break out of the strait of Messina, which was surrounded by British troops and vessels and make their way to Turkey. After the Germans successfully broke out of Messina, the navy was recalled. The fleet had by that time advanced as far south as Brindisi in south eastern Italy. After Italy entered the war on the side of France and England, the Austro-Hungarian navy bombarded several Italian installations; Babenberg took part in the attack on Ancona in 1915.

They were later decommissioned and served as harbor defense ships for the latter portion of the conflict. Their crews were then transferred to man new U-boats and aircraft. By 1918, Árpád was converted into a training ship. Following the end of the war, the ships were awarded to Great Britain as war prizes, but were instead sold and broken up for scrapping in Italy in 1921.
