= 24 cm SK L/40 =

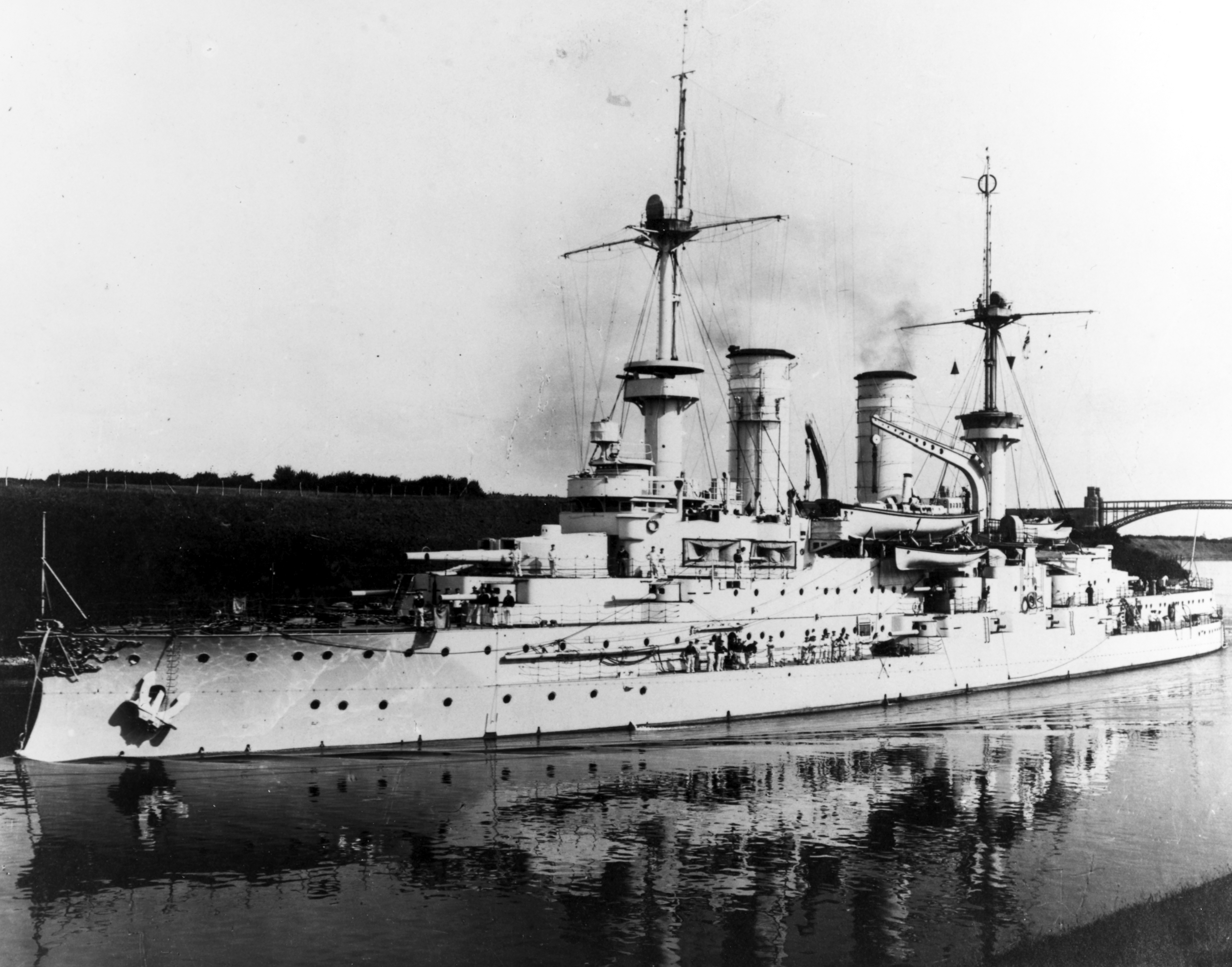
- Twin C/92 turret aboard SMS Wettin
- Type: Naval gun Coastal artillery
- Place of origin: German Empire

Service history
- In service: 1898-1945
- Used by: German Empire; Austria-Hungary; Netherlands; Nazi Germany
- Wars: Boxer Rebellion; World War I World War II

Production history
- Designer: Krupp
- Designed: 1894
- Manufacturer: Krupp
- Produced: 1898
- Variants: Krupp 24 cm L/40 K94; Skoda 24 cm L/40 K97; Skoda 24 cm L/40 K/01

Specifications
- Mass: 24,000–25,600 kg (52,900–56,400 lb)
- Length: 9.5 m (31.2 ft)
- Barrel length: 8.8 m (28.9 ft)
- Shell: Separate loading cased charges and projectiles
- Shell weight: 140–151 kg (309–333 lb)
- Caliber: 24 cm (9.4 in) caliber
- Breech: Horizontal sliding-wedge
- Recoil: Hydro-pneumatic
- Elevation: Naval Mounts: -5° to +30° Coastal Artillery: -5° to +46°
- Traverse: -150° to +150°
- Rate of fire: 3 rpm
- Muzzle velocity: WWI: 690 m/s (2,300 ft/s); WWII: 810 m/s (2,700 ft/s)
- Maximum firing range: WWI: 16.9 km (10.5 mi) at +30° WWII: 26.6 km (16.5 mi) at +46°

The 24 cm Schnelladekanone Länge 40, abbreviated as 24 cm SK L/40, was a German naval gun developed in the years before World War I that armed a number of the Imperial German Navy's pre-dreadnought battleships and armored cruisers. Later, a number of these guns were removed from naval ships and converted to coastal artillery or "Theodor Karl" railway guns, which would see service during World War I and World War II. The actual bore diameter was 23.8 cm (9.4 in), but the classification system for artillery rounded up to the next highest centimeter.

== History ==
The first L/40 24 cm Krupp gun was tested in 1892.

The 24 cm SK L/40 was designed in 1894 and produced in 1898 by Krupp for the Imperial German Navy. Krupp also produced a variant of the 24 cm SK L/40 for the Austro-Hungarian Navy called the 24 cm L/40 K94 which armed coastal defense ships, pre-dreadnought battleships and armored cruisers. Skoda later produced the Škoda 24 cm L/40 K97 and the Škoda 24 cm L/40 K/01 under license. Krupp 24 cm guns also armed coastal defense ships of the Royal Netherlands Navy.

== Construction ==
This was the first large caliber German naval gun to use a Krupp horizontal sliding-wedge breech block and separate loading metallic cased propellant charges and projectiles. Unlike other large naval guns of the time which used separate loading bagged charges and projectiles, this gun used charges inside of a brass cartridge case to provide obturation. The first twelve guns were constructed of an inner tube, two reinforcing layers of hoops and a jacket. Later guns had a third hoop added near the breech, which added 1,600 kg (3,500 lb) of weight.

== Naval Artillery ==
SMS Kaiser Karl der Grosse having her 24 cm SK L/40 guns installed

The 24 cm SK L/40 was the primary armament of two classes of pre-dreadnought battleships, the Kaiser Friedrich III class and the Wittelsbach class. It was also the primary armament of two unique armored cruisers, the SMS Fürst Bismarck and SMS Prinz Heinrich of the Imperial German Navy.

German ship details:
- Kaiser Friedrich III class - The five ships of this class had a primary armament of four guns, which were mounted in two twin gun turrets, one fore and one aft of the central superstructure.
- Wittelsbach class - The five ships of this class had a primary armament of four guns, which were mounted in two twin gun turrets, one fore and one aft of the central superstructure.
- SMS Fürst Bismarck - The primary armament of this ship was four guns, which were mounted in two twin gun turrets, one fore and one aft of the central superstructure.
- SMS Prinz Heinrich - The primary armament of this ship was two guns, which were mounted in two single gun turrets, one fore and one aft of the central superstructure.

The Krupp 24 cm L/40 K94 armed the Monarch-class coastal defense ships, the pre-dreadnought Habsburg-class battleships and the armored cruiser SMS Kaiser Karl VI of the Austro-Hungarian Navy.

Austrian ship details:
- Monarch class - The three ships of this class had a primary armament of four guns, which were mounted in two twin gun turrets, one fore and one aft of the central superstructure.
- Habsburg class - The three ships of this class had a primary armament of three guns, which were mounted in one twin gun turret fore and one single gun turret aft of the central superstructure.
- SMS Kaiser Karl VI - This ship had a primary armament of two K94 guns, which were mounted in two single gun turrets, one fore and one aft of the central superstructure. In 1916 Kaiser Karl VI was refitted with Skoda built 24 cm L/40 K97 guns.

Krupp 24 cm guns were also mounted as primary armament on the Koningin Regentes class of coastal defense ships and two unique coastal defense ships, the HNLMS Jacob van Heemskerck and the HNLMS Marten Harpertszoon Tromp of the Royal Netherlands Navy.

Dutch ship details:
- Koningin Regentes class - The three ships of this class had a primary armament of two guns, which were mounted in two single gun turrets, one fore and one aft of the central superstructure.
- HNLMS Jacob van Heemskerck - This ship had a primary armament of two guns, which were mounted in two single gun turrets, one fore and one aft of the central superstructure.
- HNLMS Marten Harpertszoon Tromp - This ship had a primary armament of two guns, which were mounted in two single gun turrets, one fore and one aft of the central superstructure.

== Coastal Artillery ==
During 1915–1916 the Kaiser Friedrich III class and the Wittelsbach-class battleships were decommissioned and disarmed. The 24 cm SK L/40 guns salvaged from these ships were also converted to coastal artillery. Eight guns in four turrets from the Kaiser Friedrich III class were emplaced at Libau. Four guns were emplaced at Battery "Hamburg" on Norderney. Lastly four guns were emplaced at Battery "S2" on Sylt. During World War II Battery "Hamburg" at Norderney was still in action and was moved to Cherbourg, where it saw action against Allied naval forces during the Bombardment of Cherbourg.

== Bibliography ==
- Friedman, Norman (2011). Naval Weapons of World War One. Barnsley, South Yorkshire, UK: Seaforth. ISBN 978-1-84832-100-7.
