= SMS Admiral Spaun =

Scout cruiser of the Austro-Hungarian Navy

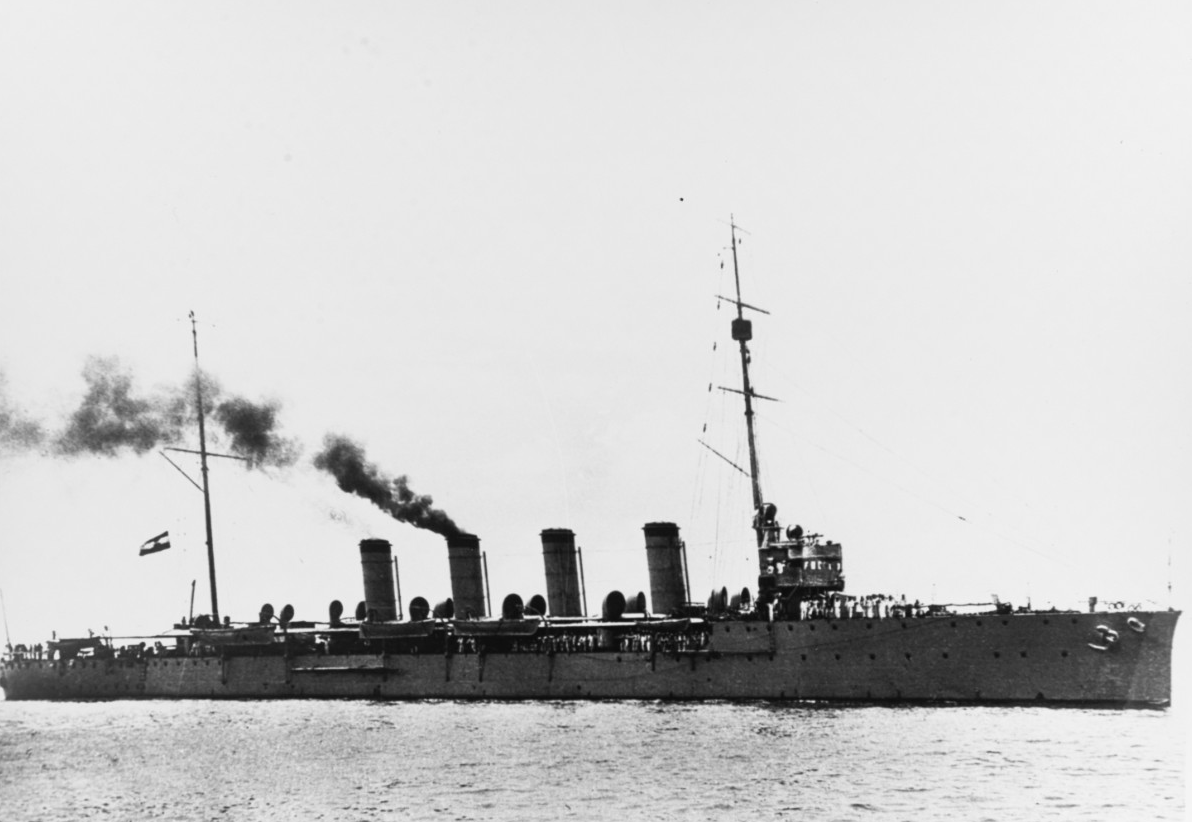
- Admiral Spaun under way

History

Austria-Hungary
- Name: Admiral Spaun
- Namesake: Hermann von Spaun
- Builder: Pola Navy Yard, Pola
- Laid down: 30 May 1908
- Launched: 30 October 1909
- Commissioned: 15 November 1910
- In service: 1910–1918
- Out of service: 1918
- Home port: Cattaro; Pola; Trieste
- Fate: Transferred to State of Slovenes, Croats and Serbs on 31 October 1918

State of Slovenes, Croats and Serbs
- Name: Admiral Spaun
- Acquired: 31 October 1918
- Fate: Seized by Italian forces on 9 November, handed over to the Allied powers on 10 November 1918

Italy
- Name: Admiral Spaun
- Acquired: 9 November 1918
- Fate: Ceded to the United Kingdom under the Treaty of Saint-Germain-en-Laye in 1920

United Kingdom
- Name: Admiral Spaun
- Acquired: 1920
- Fate: Sold for scrap in Italy and broken up between 1920 and 1921

General characteristics
- Type: Scout cruiser
- Displacement: 3,500 t (3,400 long tons) (designed); 4,000 t (3,900 long tons) (full load)
- Length: 130.6 m (428 ft 6 in) (LOA); 129.7 m (425 ft 6 in) (LWL); 125.2 m (410 ft 9 in) (LPP)
- Beam: 12.8 m (42 ft 0 in)
- Draught: 5.3 m (17 ft 5 in)
- Installed power: 16 × Yarrow boilers; 25,130–25,254 shp (18,739–18,832 kW) (Note: There are differing accounts as to what the shaft horsepower of Admiral Spaun was. Gardiner and Gray state the cruiser had 25,130 shp (18,740 kW), while Greger claims it was 25,254 shp (18,832 kW).)
- Propulsion: 4 shafts; 6 × steam turbines
- Speed: 27.07 knots (50 km/h; 31 mph)
- Complement: 320–327 (Note: Gardiner and Gray claim that Admiral Spaun had a crew of 327, while Greger states the cruiser's complement was 320.)
- Armament: 7 × 10 cm (3.9 in) guns; 1 × 7 cm (2.8 in) anti-aircraft gun; 1 × 47 mm (1.9 in) SFK L/44 gun; 2 × 45 cm (18 in) torpedo tubes (1910–1916); 4 × 53.3 cm (21 in) twin torpedo tubes (1916–1918)
- Armour: Belt 60 mm (2.4 in); Deck 20 mm (0.79 in); Conning tower 50 mm (2.0 in)

SMS Admiral Spaun (Note: "SMS" stands for "Seiner Majestät Schiff ", or "His Majesty's Ship" in German.) was a scout cruiser built for the Austro-Hungarian Navy. Named for Admiral and Marinekommandant (Commander-in-Chief of the Navy) Hermann von Spaun, Admiral Spaun was constructed shortly before World War I. Laid down at the Pola Navy Yard in May 1908, the cruiser was launched in October 1909. Admiral Spaun was commissioned into the Navy just over a year later, in November 1910. The first ship of the Austro-Hungarian Navy to be constructed with steam turbines, her design later influenced the construction of the Novara-class cruisers.

Admiral Spaun served as the flotilla leader of the Second Torpedo Flotilla at the outbreak of World War I and was stationed out of the naval base at Cattaro. She saw limited action during the first year of the war, and following Italy's declaration of war on Austria-Hungary in May 1915, the cruiser participated in a bombardment of the Italian coastline. Throughout the rest of 1915, Admiral Spaun engaged in various operations across the Adriatic Sea. While she was involved in missions centred mostly around Trieste in the northern Adriatic for the rest of the war, Admiral Spaun also participated in many of Austria-Hungary's naval operations as far south as the Otranto Barrage and the Strait of Otranto, alongside the Novara-class cruisers.

Emboldened by the Austro-Hungarian victory during the Battle of the Strait of Otranto, and determined to break the Otranto Barrage with a major attack on the strait, Austria-Hungary's newly appointed Commander-in-Chief of the Fleet Miklós Horthy organised a massive attack on the Allied forces with Admiral Spaun, alongside seven battleships, three cruisers, four destroyers, four torpedo boats, and numerous submarines and aircraft, but the operation was abandoned after the battleship Szent István was sunk by the Italian motor torpedo boat MAS-15 on the morning of 10 June.

After the sinking of Szent István, the ships returned to port where they remained for the rest of the war. When Austria-Hungary was facing defeat in October 1918, the Austrian government transferred its navy to the newly formed State of Slovenes, Croats and Serbs in order to avoid having to hand the ship over to the Allies. Following the Armistice of Villa Giusti in November 1918, Admiral Spaun was seized by the Allies and transferred to Italy, where she participated in a victory parade through the Venice Lagoon in March 1919. The final distribution of Austria-Hungary's former navy was settled under the terms of the Treaty of Saint-Germain-en-Laye in 1920. Admiral Spaun was ceded to the United Kingdom before being sold for scrap and broken up between 1920 and 1921.

== Background ==
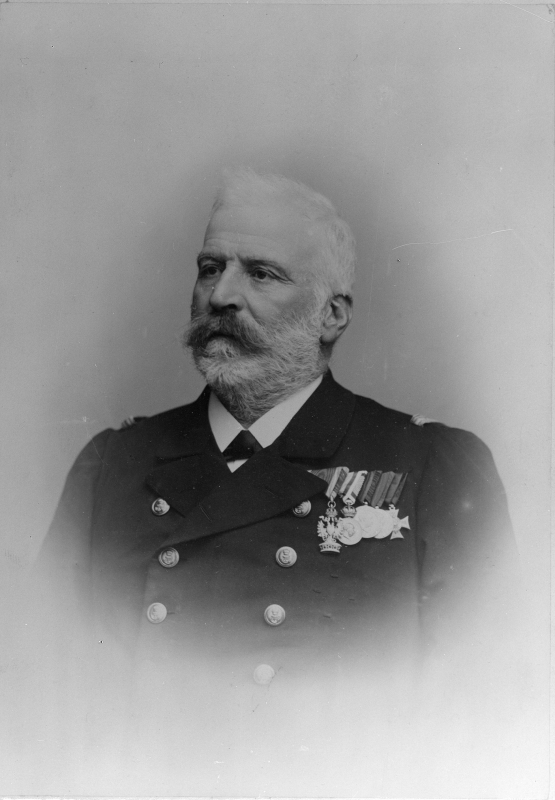
Rudolf Montecuccoli, Marinekommandant of the Austro-Hungarian Navy from 1904 to 1913

In 1904, the Austro-Hungarian Navy consisted of ten battleships of various types, three armoured cruisers, six protected cruisers, eight torpedo vessels, and 68 torpedo craft. The total tonnage of the navy was 131,000 tonnes (129,000 long tons; 144,000 short tons). While the navy was capable of defending the coastline of Austria-Hungary, this fleet was drastically outclassed by other major Mediterranean navies, namely Italy and the United Kingdom. Following the establishment of the Austrian Naval League in September 1904, (Note: The full name of the Austrian Naval League was "The Association for Advancement of Austrian Shipping: The Austrian Fleet's Association") and the October appointment of Vice-Admiral Rudolf Montecuccoli to the posts of Commander-in-Chief of the Navy (German: Marinekommandant) and Chief of the Naval Section of the War Ministry (German: Chef der Marinesektion), the Austro-Hungarian Navy began an expansion program suitable for that of a Great Power. Montecuccoli immediately pursued the efforts championed by his predecessor, Admiral Hermann von Spaun, and pushed for a greatly expanded and modernized navy.

During the first decade of the 20th century, Austria-Hungary's naval policy began to shift away from simply coastal defence, to projecting power into the Adriatic and even Mediterranean Seas. This change in policy was motivated by both internal and external factors. New railroads had been constructed through Austria's Alpine passes between 1906 and 1908, linking Trieste and the Dalmatian coastline to the rest of the Empire and providing the interior of Austria-Hungary with quicker access to the sea than ever before. Lower tariffs on the port of Trieste aided the expansion of the city and a similar growth in Austria-Hungary's merchant marine. These changes necessitated the development of a new line of battleships capable of more than the defence of Austria-Hungary's coastline.

Prior to the turn of the century, sea power had not been a priority in Austrian foreign policy, and the navy had little public interest or support. The appointment of Archduke Franz Ferdinand – heir to the Austro-Hungarian throne and a prominent and influential supporter of naval expansion – to the position of admiral in September 1902 greatly increased the importance of the navy in the eyes of both the general public and the Austrian and Hungarian Parliaments. Franz Ferdinand's interest in naval affairs stemmed primarily from his belief that a strong navy would be necessary to compete with Italy, which he viewed as Austria-Hungary's greatest regional threat.

=== Austro-Italian naval arms race ===
As the first scout cruiser of the Austro-Hungarian Navy, Admiral Spaun was authorized when Austria-Hungary was engaged in a naval arms race with its nominal ally, Italy. Italy's Regia Marina was considered the most-important naval power in the region which Austria-Hungary measured itself against, often unfavourably. The disparity between the Austro-Hungarian and Italian navies had existed for decades; in the late 1880s Italy boasted the third-largest fleet in the world, behind the French Navy and the British Royal Navy. While that disparity had been somewhat equalized with the Imperial Russian Navy and the German Imperial Navy surpassing the Italian Navy in 1893 and in 1894, by 1904 the balance began to shift towards Italy's favour once more. Indeed, by 1904 the size of the Italian Regia Marina was by tonnage was over twice that of the Austro-Hungarian Navy, and while the two nations had relatively even numbers of battleships, Italy had over twice as many cruisers.

Naval strength of Italy and Austria-Hungary in 1904 (Note: This table includes battleships which would later on be relegated to secondary roles, such as the Monarch-class coastal defence ships)
| Type | Italy | | Austria-Hungary | | Italian/Austro-Hungarian tonnage ratio |
| Type | Number | Tonnage | Number | Tonnage | Italian/Austro-Hungarian tonnage ratio |
| Battleships | 13 | 166,724 tonnes (164,091 long tons; 183,782 short tons) | 10 | 85,560 tonnes (84,210 long tons; 94,310 short tons) | 1.9:1 |
| Armoured cruisers | 6 | 39,903 tonnes (39,273 long tons; 43,986 short tons) | 3 | 18,810 tonnes (18,510 long tons; 20,730 short tons) | 2.1:1 |
| Protected cruisers | 14 | 37,393 tonnes (36,802 long tons; 41,219 short tons) | 6 | 17,454 tonnes (17,178 long tons; 19,240 short tons) | 2.1:1 |
| Torpedo vessels | 15 | 12,848 tonnes (12,645 long tons; 14,162 short tons) | 8 | 5,070 tonnes (4,990 long tons; 5,590 short tons) | 2.5:1 |
| Torpedo Craft | 145 | 10,477 tonnes (10,312 long tons; 11,549 short tons) | 68 | 4,252 tonnes (4,185 long tons; 4,687 short tons) | 2.4:1 |
| Total | 195 | 267,345 tonnes (263,123 long tons; 294,697 short tons) | 95 | 131,246 tonnes (129,173 long tons; 144,674 short tons) | 2.3:1 |

=== Montecuccoli's plan ===
Admiral Spaun first conceived on paper in early 1905 when Montecuccoli drafted his first proposal for a modern Austrian fleet as part of his plan to construct a navy large enough to contest the Adriatic Sea. This initial plan consisted of 12 battleships, four armoured cruisers, eight scout cruisers, 18 destroyers, 36 high seas torpedo craft, and six submarines. While specifics had yet to be drawn up, the four cruisers in Montecuccoli's plan would ultimately become Admiral Spaun and the three ships of the Novara class. Due to a political crisis within the Hungarian government, a vote on Montecuccoli's proposed program was delayed for most of 1905. It would not be until the end of the year before the Austrian and Hungarian Delegations for Common Affairs approved Montecuccoli's program. Under the terms of the budget agreement, 121,000,000 Krone was set aside for warship construction over a period of three years, with the installments for this special credit being retroactively pushed back to 1904. The budget lacked funding for the three other cruisers Montecuccoli wished to construct, but included funding for the three Erzherzog Karl-class battleships, six destroyers, and Admiral Spaun.

== Design ==
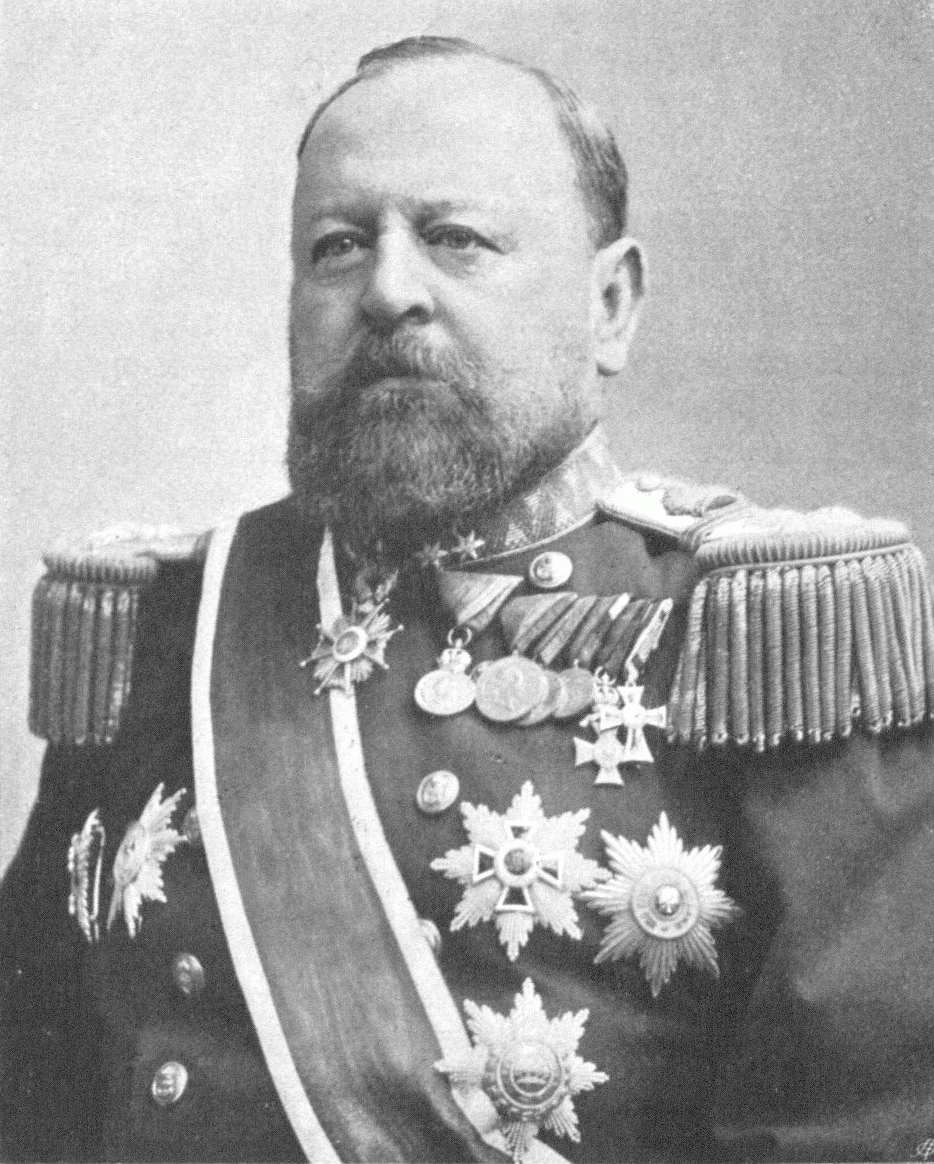
Admiral Hermann Freiherr von Spaun, former Marinekommandant of the Austro-Hungarian Navy and namesake of the cruiser Admiral Spaun

Designed for scouting missions, Admiral Spaun was based on the premise that the theater of operations she would operate in would be largely confined to the Adriatic Sea. She was intended to act as a fast moving scout cruiser capable of conducting hit-and-run missions while also threatening communications and convoy routes. Montecuccoli believed that should Austria-Hungary be drawn into a larger naval conflict encompassing the Mediterranean, Admiral Spaun would still be capable of fulfilling her role successfully and that a class of battlecruisers was not necessary for such a scenario. Following the construction of Admiral Spaun, her design was so well received that she was used to influence the construction of the three Novara-class cruisers which followed her. The similarities between Admiral Spaun and the Novaras were so close that despite being different classes, both contemporary and modern publications occasionally link all four ships together as members of the same class.

Admiral Spaun had an overall length of 130.6 metres (428 ft 6 in). At the waterline, the cruiser had a length of 129.7 metres (425 ft 6 in), while her length between perpendiculars measured 125.2 metres (410 ft 9 in). She had a beam of 12.8 metres (42 ft 0 in) and a mean draft of 5.3 metres (17 ft 5 in) at deep load. She was designed to displace 3,500 tonnes (3,400 long tons; 3,900 short tons) at normal load, but at full combat load she displaced 4,000 tonnes (3,900 long tons; 4,400 short tons). The propulsion systems of the ship consisted of six Parsons steam turbines and four shafts. These turbines were designed to provide 25,130–25,254 shp (18,739–18,832 kW) and were powered by 16 Yarrow water-tube boilers, giving Admiral Spaun a top speed of 27.07 knots (50.13 km/h; 31.15 mph) during her sea trials. Admiral Spaun had a crew of 320–327 officers and men.

Admiral Spaun was armed with a main battery of seven 50-caliber 10 cm (3.9 in) guns in single pedestal mounts. Two were placed forward on the forecastle of the ship, four were located amidship, two on either side, and one was located on the quarterdeck. She also possessed a 47 mm (1.9 in) SFK L/44 gun. A Škoda 7 cm (2.8 in)/50 K10 anti-aircraft gun and four 53.3 cm (21.0 in) torpedo tubes in twin mounts were added to Admiral Spaun in 1916. The guns of Admiral Spaun were of a smaller caliber than many other cruisers of the era, which led to plans to remove the guns on the forecastle and quarterdeck of the ship and replace them with a pair of 15-centimetre (5.9 in) guns fore and aft, but these modifications were not able to take place before the war ended. Her smaller armament was due in part because of a desire within the Austro-Hungarian Navy for Admiral Spaun to have a faster speed and greater armour than most other contemporary cruisers of the era. As a result, the armament of the cruiser had to be scaled down.

Admiral Spaun was protected at the waterline by an armoured belt which measured 60 mm (2.4 in) thick amidship. The guns had 40 mm (1.6 in) thick shields, while the thickness of the deck for the ship was 20 mm (0.79 in). The armour protecting the conning tower was 60 mm (2.4 in).

== Construction ==
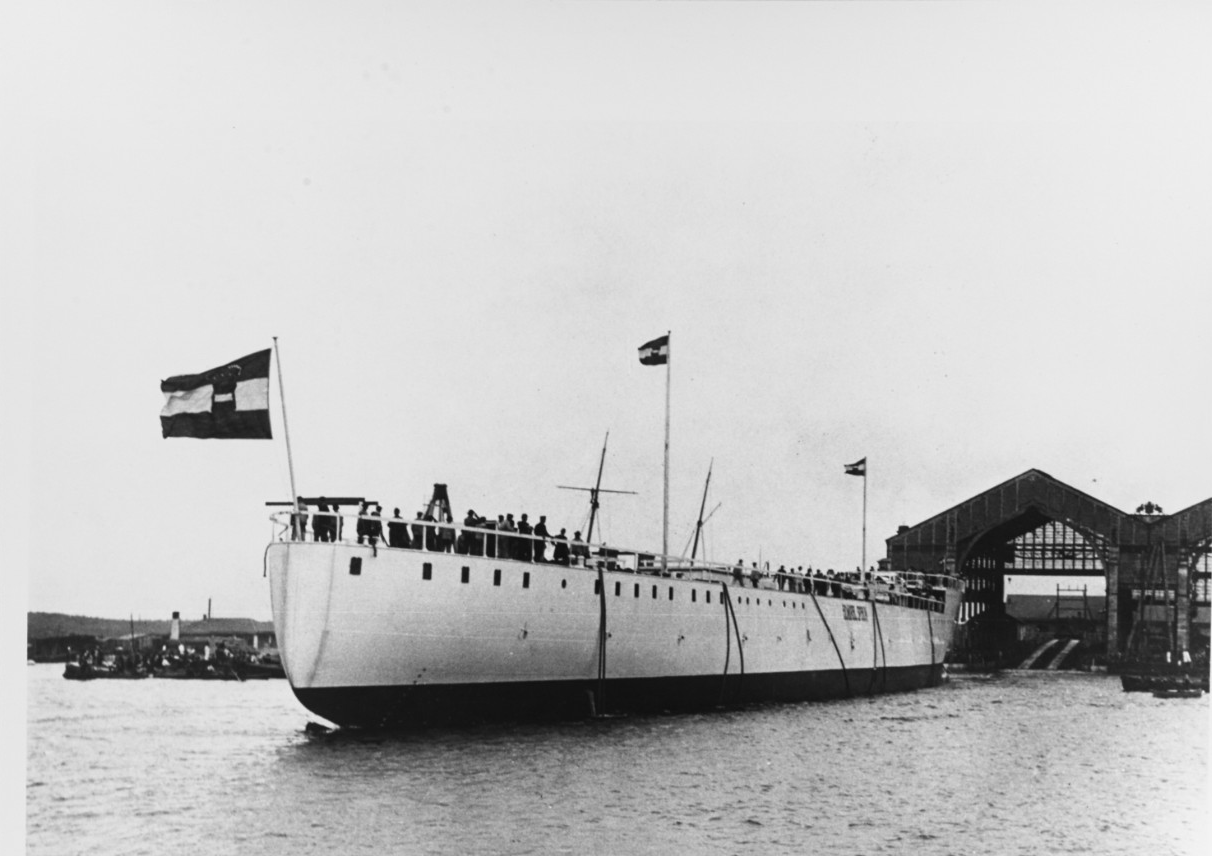
The launching of Admiral Spaun from the Pola Navy Yard on 30 October 1909

Admiral Spaun was laid down at the Pola Navy Yard on 30 May 1908. During construction, Stabilimento Tecnico Triestino struck an agreement with the Parsons Marine Steam Turbine Company to allow for the construction of Admiral Spaun's steam turbines to be assembled in Trieste using materials found from within the Austro-Hungarian Empire. She was the first ship of the Austro-Hungarian Navy to be constructed with steam turbines.

In September 1909, Montecuccoli proposed to the Austro-Hungarian Ministerial Council a budget for 1910 which would authorise construction on the three cruisers of the Novara class, alongside the four dreadnoughts of the Tegetthoff-class battleships and several torpedo boats and submarines. While Montecuccoli's desire to construct a new class of cruisers was delayed, this time due to the financial costs Austria-Hungary took on following the annexation of Bosnia and the mobilisation of her fleet and army at the height of Bosnian crisis, the navy was given funds to speed up completion of the Radetzky-class battleships and Admiral Spaun.

After nearly a year and a half of construction, Admiral Spaun was launched on 30 October 1909. Thereafter, she conducted sea trials for a year. When Admiral Spaun was ordered, she was designed to attain a speed greater than contemporary cruisers found in other navies around the world, such as the United States Navy and the British Royal Navy. In September 1910, it was reported that she obtained a top speed of 27.07 knots (50.13 km/h; 31.15 mph). This was 1.07 knots (1.98 km/h; 1.23 mph) faster than her contracted speed. After the conclusion of her sea trials, Admiral Spaun was commissioned into the Austro-Hungarian Navy on 15 November 1910.

== Service history ==
=== Pre-war ===
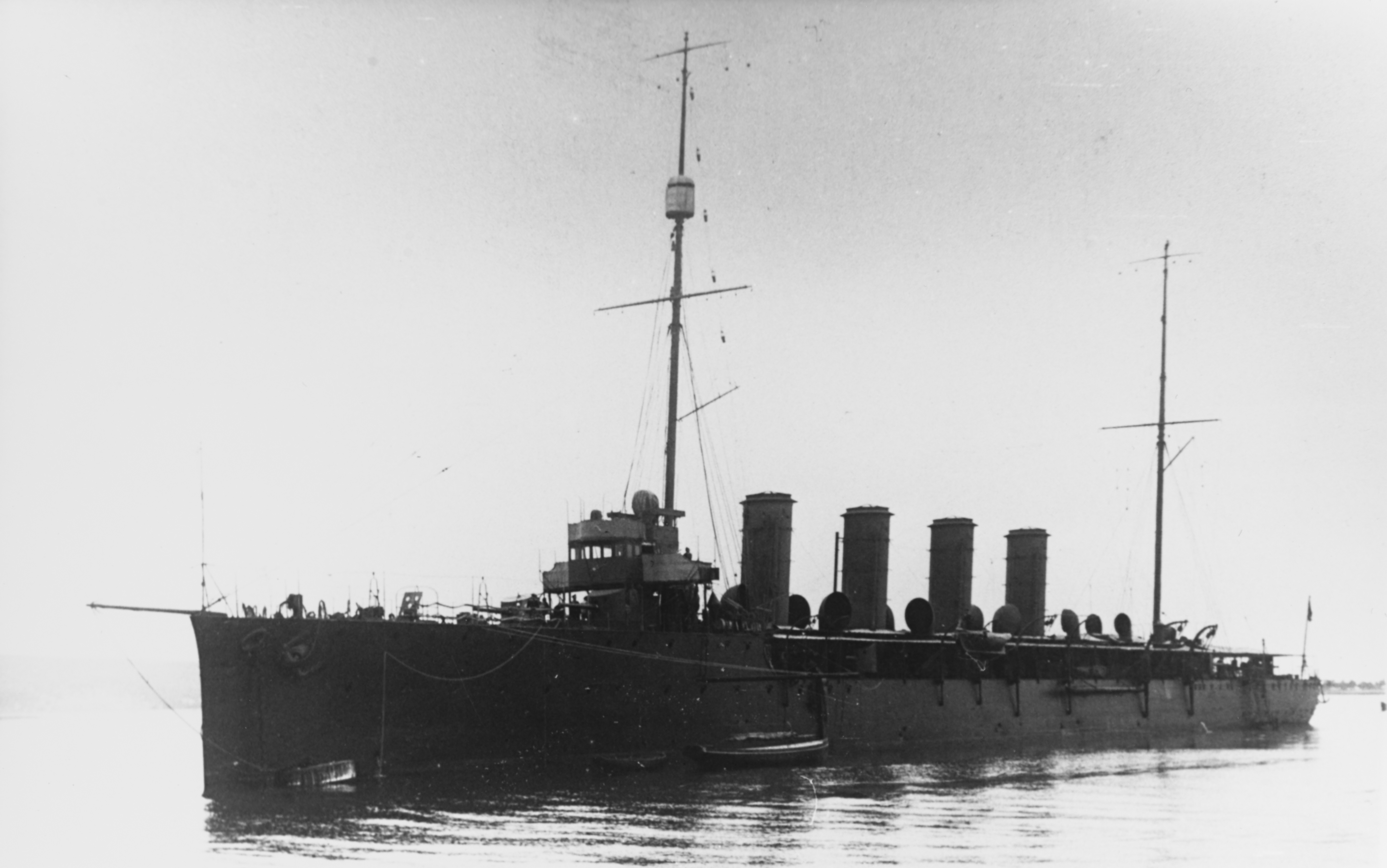
Admiral Spaun at rest

Within a year of Admiral Spaun's commissioning into the Austro-Hungarian Navy, the Italo-Turkish War erupted in September 1911. Despite the fact that Austria-Hungary and Italy remained nominal allies under the Triple Alliance, tensions between the two nations remained high throughout the war. The Austro-Hungarian Navy was placed on high alert, while the Army was deployed to the Italian border. While the war would ultimately become localised at the request of Austria-Hungary to parts of the Eastern Mediterranean and Libya, the First Balkan War broke out even before Italy and the Ottoman Empire were able to conclude a peace agreement. Once again, the Ottoman military proved insufficient to defeat its opponents. The Balkan League of Bulgaria, Serbia, Greece, and Montenegro swiftly overran the Ottoman Empire's last remaining European possessions in a matter of weeks. By November 1912, Serbia appeared poised to obtain a port on the Adriatic Sea. Austria-Hungary strongly opposed this as a Serbian port on the Adriatic could drastically alter the balance of power in the region, bring Serbia and Italy closer together through economic ties, and also serve as a Russian naval base.

Austria-Hungary found support from Italy, who opposed Serbian access to the Adriatic on the belief that Russia would use any Serbian ports to station its Black Sea fleet. Italy also feared that Austria-Hungary itself would one day annex Serbia, and thus gain more Adriatic coastline without handing over any Italian-speaking territories such as Trentino or Trieste. Russia and Serbia both protested to Vienna this objection to a potential Serbian coastline. By the end of November 1912, the threat of conflict between Austria-Hungary, Italy, Serbia, and Russia, coupled with allegations of Serbian mistreatment of the Austro-Hungarian consul in Prisrena led to a war scare in the Balkans. Both Russian and Austria-Hungary began mobilizing troops along their border, while Austria-Hungary began to mobilize against Serbia. During the crisis, the entire Austro-Hungarian Navy was also fully mobilized. At the time, several Austro-Hungarian warships had already been deployed to the Aegean Sea or the city of Constantinople to protect Austro-Hungarian interests during the Italo-Turkish War and the First Balkan War. The Navy subsequently ordered Admiral Spaun and Aspern from their stations in Constantinople. They were ordered to join the rest of the fleet in the Aegean Sea in the event of a war with Serbia and Russia.

By December 1912, the Austro-Hungarian Navy had, in addition to Admiral Spaun, a total of seven battleships, five cruisers, eight destroyers, 28 torpedo boats, and six submarines ready for combat. The crisis eventually subsided after the signing of the Treaty of London, which granted Serbia free access to the sea through an internationally supervised railroad, while at the same time establishing an independent Albania. The Austro-Hungarian Army and Navy was subsequently demobilised on 28 May 1913.

In June 1914, the battleship Viribus Unitis was tasked with transporting Archduke Franz Ferdinand to the Condominium of Bosnia and Herzegovina in order to watch military manoeuvres. Following the manoeuvres, Ferdinand and his wife Sophie planned to visit Sarajevo to open the state museum in its new premises. On 24 June the battleship brought the Archduke from Trieste to the Narenta River, where he boarded a yacht which took him north towards Sarajevo. After observing the military maneuvers for three days, the Archduke met his wife in Sarajevo. On 28 June 1914, they were shot to death by Gavrilo Princip.

Upon hearing of the assassination, Marinekommandant Anton Haus sailed south from Pola with an escort fleet comprising Admiral Spaun, Viribus Unitis's sister ship Tegetthoff, and several torpedo boats. Two days after their murders, Ferdinand and Sophia's bodies were transferred aboard Viribus Unitis, which had been anchored waiting to receive the Archduke for his return, and were transported back to Trieste. Viribus Unitis was shadowed by Haus' escort fleet for the journey, with the fleet moving slowly along the Dalmatian coast, usually within sight of land. Coastal towns and villages rang church bells when the ships passed while spectators watched the fleet from the shoreline. The Archduke's death triggered the July Crisis, culminating in Austria-Hungary's declaration of war on the Kingdom of Serbia on 28 July 1914.

=== 1914 ===
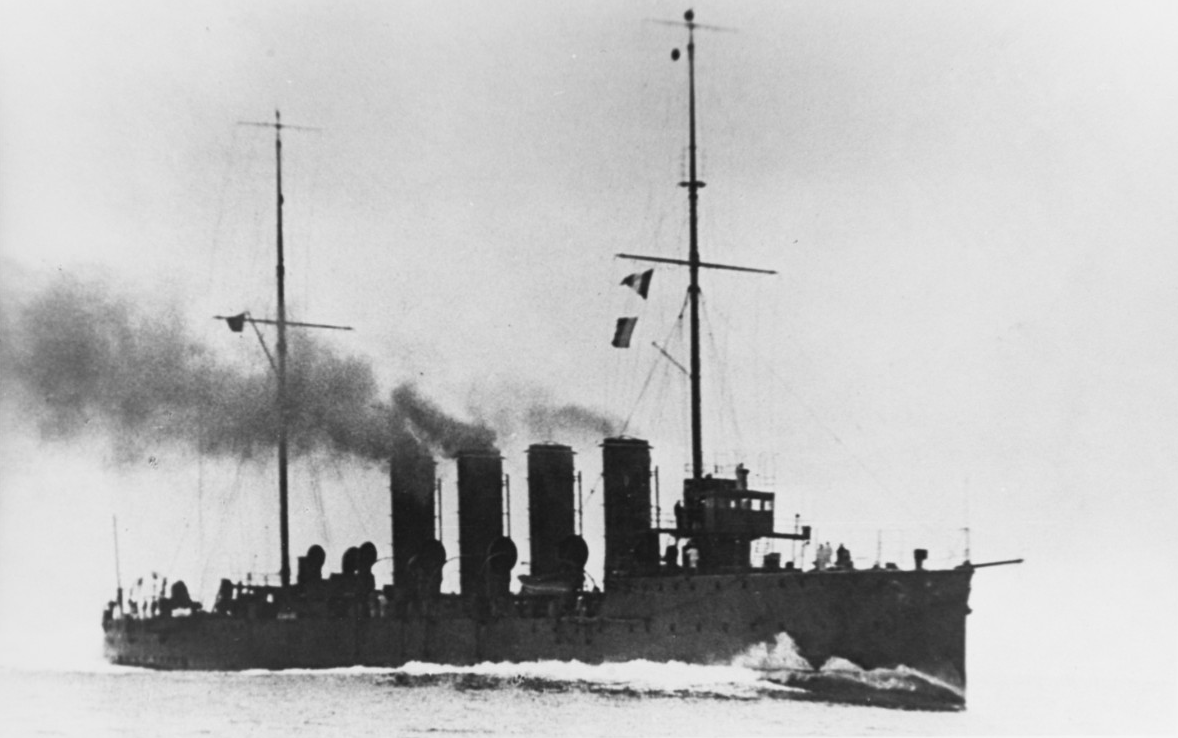
Admiral Spaun underway

Events unfolded rapidly in the ensuing days. On 30 July 1914, Russia declared full mobilisation in response to Austria-Hungary's declaration of war on Serbia. Austria-Hungary declared full mobilisation the next day. On 1 August, both Germany and France ordered full mobilisation and Germany declared war on Russia in support of Austria-Hungary. While relations between Austria-Hungary and Italy had improved greatly in the two years following the 1912 renewal of the Triple Alliance, increased Austro-Hungarian naval spending, political disputes over influence in Albania, and Italian concerns over the potential annexation of land in the Kingdom of Montenegro caused the relationship between the two allies to falter in the months leading up to the war. Italy's 1 August declaration of neutrality in the war dashed Austro-Hungarian hopes to use their larger ships—including Admiral Spaun—in major combat operations in the Mediterranean, as the navy had been relying upon coal stored in Italian ports to operate in conjunction with the Regia Marina. By 4 August, Germany had already occupied Luxembourg and invaded Belgium after declaring war on France. The United Kingdom subsequently declared war on Germany that same day in support of Belgian neutrality.

Shortly after the onset of the war, the assistance of the Austro-Hungarian fleet was called upon by the German Mediterranean Division, which consisted of the battlecruiser Goeben and light cruiser Breslau. The German ships were attempting to break out of Messina, where they had been taking on coal prior to the outbreak of war. By the first week of August, British ships had begun to assemble off Messina in an attempt to trap the Germans. While Austria-Hungary had not yet fully mobilised its fleet, a force was assembled to assist the German ships. This consisted of Admiral Spaun, along with the three Radetzkys and the three Tegetthoffs, the armoured cruiser Sankt Georg, six destroyers, and 13 torpedo boats. The Austro-Hungarian high command, wary of instigating war with Great Britain, ordered the fleet to avoid the British ships and to only support the Germans openly while they were in Austro-Hungarian waters. On 7 August, when the Germans broke out of Messina, the Austro-Hungarian fleet had begun to sail for Brindisi to link up with the Germans and escort their ships to a friendly port in Austria-Hungary. However, the German movement toward the mouth of the Adriatic had been a diversion to throw the British and French off their pursuit, and the German ships instead rounded the southern tip of Greece and made their way to the Dardanelles, where they would eventually be sold to the Ottoman Empire. Rather than follow the German ships towards the Black Sea, the Austrian fleet returned to Pola.

Following France and Britain's declarations of war on Austria-Hungary on 11 and 12 August respectively, the French Admiral Augustin Boué de Lapeyrère was issued orders to close off Austro-Hungarian shipping at the entrance to the Adriatic Sea and to engage any Austro-Hungarian ships his Anglo-French fleet came across. Lapeyrère chose to attack the Austro-Hungarian ships blockading Montenegro. The ensuing Battle of Antivari ended Austria-Hungary's blockade, and effectively placed the Strait of Otranto firmly in the hands of Britain and France.

After the Battle of Antivari and the breakout of Goeben and Breslau from Messina, the Austro-Hungarian Navy saw very little action, with many of its ships spending much of their time in port. The navy's general inactivity was partly caused by a fear of mines in the Adriatic. Other factors contributed to the lack of naval activity in the first year of the war. Admiral Haus was fearful that direct confrontation with the French Navy, even if it should be successful, would weaken the Austro-Hungarian Navy to the point that Italy would have a free hand in the Adriatic. This concern was so great to Haus that he wrote in September 1914, "So long as the possibility exists that Italy will declare war against us, I consider it my first duty to keep our fleet intact." Haus' decision to keep his fleet in port earned sharp criticism from the Austro-Hungarian Army, the German Navy, and the Austro-Hungarian Foreign Ministry, but it also led to a far greater number of Allied naval forces being devoted to the Mediterranean and the Strait of Otranto. These could have been used elsewhere, such as against the Ottoman Empire during the Gallipoli Campaign. Throughout the rest of 1914, Admiral Spaun was among the most active ships in the Austro-Hungarian Navy, despite chronic engine problems.

=== 1915 ===
Admiral Spaun at sea

By January 1915, Haus had adopted a cautious strategy to preserve his fleet, as Austria-Hungary was drastically outnumbered by the Anglo-French fleets in the Mediterranean, and the attitude of Austria-Hungary's erstwhile ally Italy remained unknown. Haus decided the best course of action would be to act as a fleet in being, which would tie down Allied naval forces, while torpedo boats, mines, and raids with fast cruisers like Admiral Spaun could be used to reduce the numerical superiority of the enemy fleets before a decisive battle could be fought.

However, engine and other machinery problems related to her propulsion systems hindered Admiral Spaun's abilities to be deployed for operations in the Adriatic in a similar fashion to the ships of the Novara class. Indeed, Gardiner and Grey write in Conway's All the World's Fighting Ships 1906–1921 that "the ship suffered so many teething troubles with her engines that she never participated in the cruiser operations of her successors, although she saw wartime service in minor and less dangerous roles." Instead, the ships of the Novara class continued operations in the Adriatic, conducting missions such as towing U-boats out into the Mediterranean or raiding Allied convoys and drifters guarding the Strait of Otranto. Nevertheless, Admiral Spaun would participate in the largest and most successful Austro-Hungarian naval operation of the war following Italy's entry into the conflict on the side of the Allies in May 1915.

=== Bombardment of Ancona ===
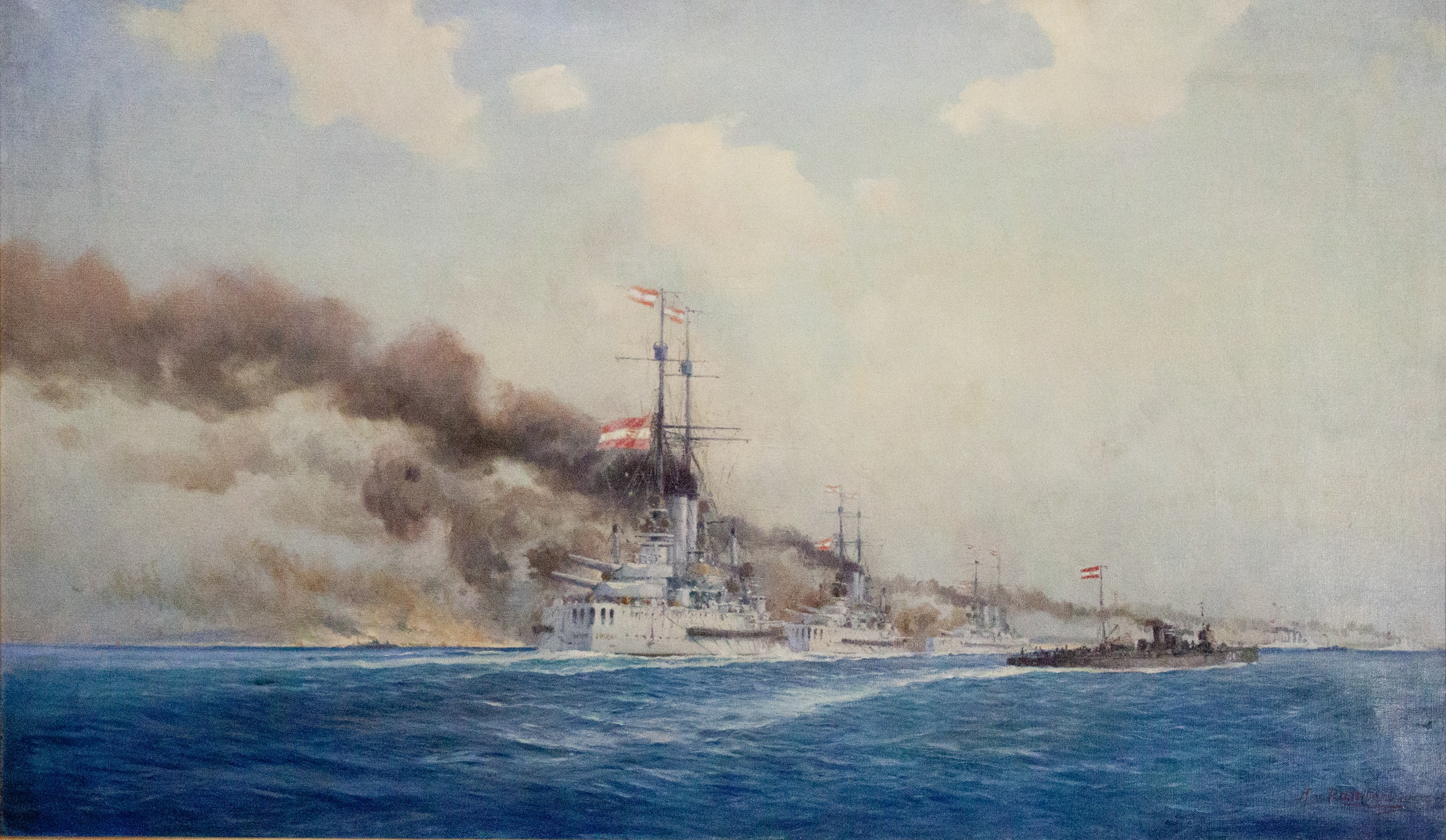
Bombarding of Ancona by August von Ramberg, depicting Austro-Hungarian battleships shelling the Italian coastline in May 1915

After failed negotiations with Germany and Austria-Hungary over Italy joining the war as a member of the Central Powers, the Italians negotiated with the Triple Entente for Italy's eventual entry into the war on their side in the Treaty of London, signed on 26 April 1915. On 4 May Italy formally renounced her alliance to Germany and Austria-Hungary, giving the Austro-Hungarians advanced warning that Italy was preparing to go to war against them. On 20 May, Emperor Franz Joseph I gave the Austro-Hungarian Navy authorisation to attack Italian ships convoying troops in the Adriatic or sending supplies to Montenegro. Haus meanwhile made preparations for his fleet to sortie out into the Adriatic in a massive strike against the Italians the moment war was declared. On 23 May 1915, between two and four hours after the Italian declaration of war reached the main Austro-Hungarian naval base at Pola, (Note: Halpern states that it was four hours after the news of Italy's declaration of war reached Pola until the fleet set sail while Sokol claims that the fleet departed two hours after the declaration reached Admiral Haus.) the Austro-Hungarian fleet, including Admiral Spaun, departed to bombard the Italian coast.

During the Austro-Hungarian attacks along the Italian coastline, Admiral Spaun, the cruisers Saida, Helgoland, and Szigetvár, as well as nine destroyers, provided a screen against a possible Italian counterattack. The expected Italian counterattack failed to materialize however. While scouting in the southern Adriatic, Admiral Spaun bombarded the port of Termoli, inflicting damage on a railway bridge and freight train, before moving on to Campomarino where she shelled the city's freight yard and train station buildings, destroying both. Meanwhile, the core of the Austro-Hungarian Navy, spearheaded by the ships of the Tegetthoff class, made their way to Ancona. The bombardment of Ancona was a major success for the Austro-Hungarian Navy. In the port of Ancona, an Italian steamer was destroyed and three others damaged, while an Italian destroyer—Turbine—was sunk further south. The infrastructure of the port of Ancona and the surrounding towns was severely damaged. The railroad yard and port facilities in the city were damaged or destroyed, while local shore batteries defending them were knocked out. Multiple wharves, warehouses, oil tanks, radio stations, and coal and oil stores were set on fire by the bombardment, and the city's electricity, gas, and telephone lines were severed. Within the city itself, Ancona's police headquarters, army barracks, military hospital, sugar refinery, and Bank of Italy offices all saw damage. 30 Italian soldiers and 38 civilians were killed, while an additional 150 were wounded in the attack. During the attacks along the Italian coastline that day, Austro-Hungarian seaplanes also bombed Venice and Ancona.

The Austro-Hungarian fleet would later move on to bombard the coast of Montenegro, without opposition; by the time Italian ships arrived on the scene, the Austro-Hungarians were safely back in port. The objective of the bombardment of Italy's coastline was to delay the Italian Army from deploying its forces along the border with Austria-Hungary by destroying critical transportation systems, and the surprise attack on Ancona and the Italian Adriatic coast succeeded in delaying the Italian deployment to the Alps for two weeks. This delay gave Austria-Hungary valuable time to strengthen the Italian front and re-deploy some of its troops from the Eastern and Balkan fronts. The bombardment and sinking of several Italian ships also delivered a severe blow to Italian military and public morale.

=== 1915–1916 ===
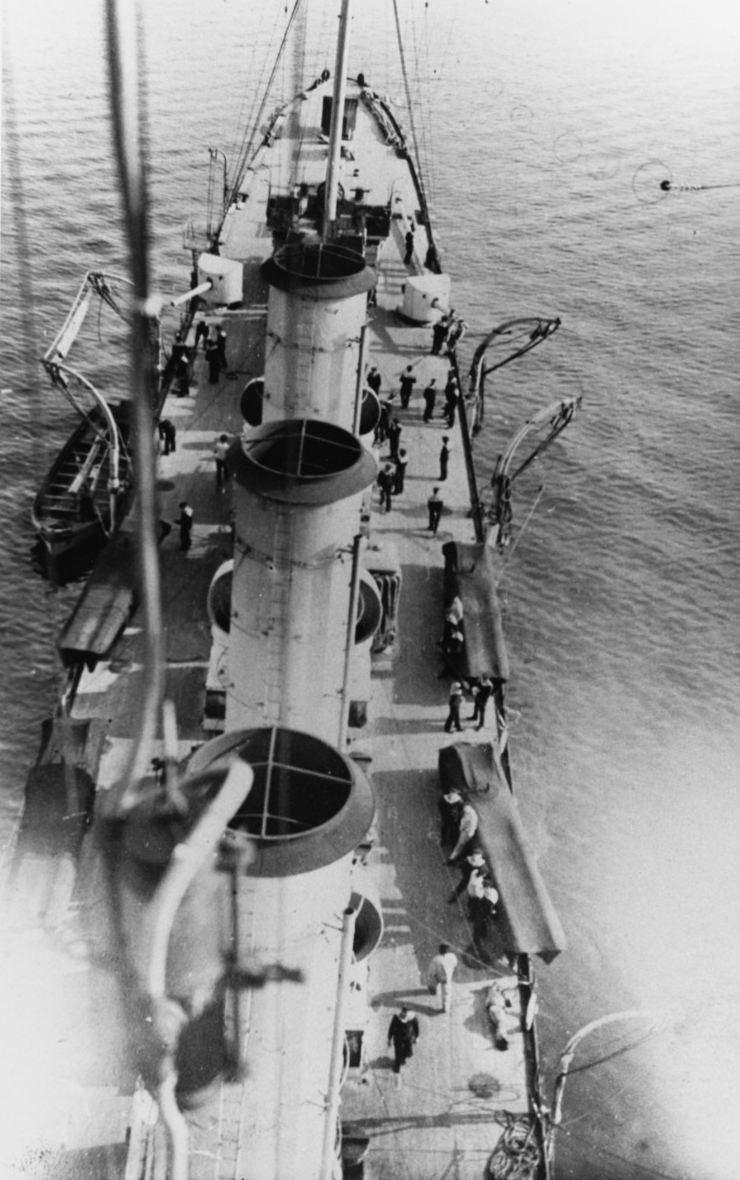
The deck of Admiral Spaun in 1917. The four twin torpedo tube mounts are visible under their covers

Following Italy's entry into the war in May 1915, Admiral Spaun would be among the most regularly used ships throughout the rest of the year against the Italians in the Adriatic. However, her mechanical problems prevented her from engaging in the same number of raids and sorties as the Novara-class cruisers. During this time, Admiral Spaun spent most of her time in service in the northern Adriatic, providing cover for Austro-Hungarian ships conducting mine-laying and mine-sweeping operations. Nevertheless, she did participate in some raids in the southern Adriatic in a secondary role. On the night of 28 December 1915, Helgoland and five destroyers participated in a raid on French and Italian ships. During this raid, Helgoland rammed and sank the French submarine Monge between Brindisi and the Albanian port of Durazzo, before attacking shipping in Durazzo the following morning. After sinking several ships in the port, two of the Austro-Hungarian destroyers accompanying Helgoland struck mines and one sank. In response to these setbacks, Novara, Admiral Spaun, and the Monarch-class coastal defense ship Budapest were mobilised to support Helgoland and the Austro-Hungarian destroyers. Helgoland was unscathed in the operation and managed to evade the Allied pursuit when darkness fell, rendezvousing with the reinforcements sent out to escort her back to Cattaro. Admiral Spaun saw much less action throughout 1916 as mechanical issues remained a problem. Instead, she remained on duty in more secondary roles and underwent a refit to strengthen her anti-aircraft and torpedo weaponry. Despite these setbacks, throughout most of the war Admiral Spaun and the Novara-class ships served as the "real capital ships of the Adriatic", as many of the larger ships of the Austro-Hungarian Navy—such as the Tegetthoff-class battleships—remained at port in Pola between May 1915 and June 1918.

=== 1917–1918 ===
Following the torpedoing of the coastal defence ship Wien on 10 December 1917, Admiral Spaun, the pre-dreadnought battleship Árpád, and six destroyers were sent to reinforce Austria-Hungary's harbour defences in Trieste. On 19 December, these warships linked up with Budapest, as well as 16 torpedo boats, five minesweepers, and five seaplanes to bombard Italian artillery positions at the mouth of the Piave River. This operation was supposed to provide cover for a division of the Royal Hungarian Honvéd to cross the river, but failed due to poor weather. By 1 January, Admiral Spaun and the rest of this fleet had withdrawn back to Pola.

After the Cattaro Mutiny, Admiral Maximilian Njegovan was fired as Marinekommandant, though at Njegovan's request it was announced that he was retiring. Miklós Horthy, who had since been promoted to commander of the battleship Prinz Eugen, was promoted to rear admiral and named Flottenkommandant (Commander-in-Chief of the Fleet). Horthy's promotion was met with support among many members of the naval officer corps, who believed he would use Austria-Hungary's navy to engage the enemy. Horthy's appointment posed difficulties. His relatively young age alienated many of the senior officers, and Austria-Hungary's naval traditions included an unspoken rule that no officer could serve at sea under someone of inferior seniority. This meant that the heads of the First and Second Battle Squadrons, as well as the Cruiser Flotilla, all had to go into early retirement or take shore-based positions.

=== Otranto Raid ===
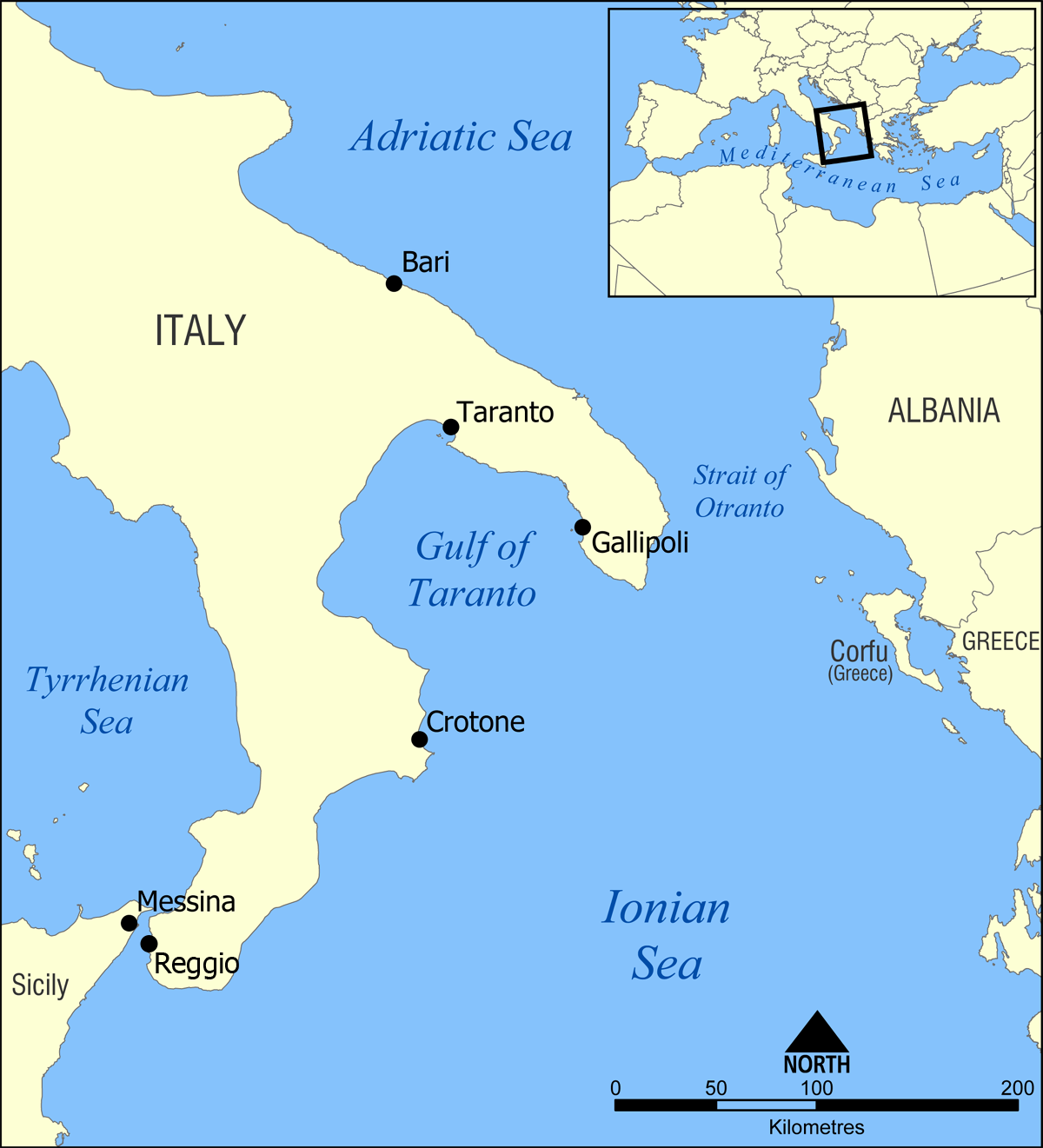
Map showing the location of the Straits of Otranto at the southern end of the Adriatic

Horthy was determined to use the fleet to attack the Otranto Barrage, and he planned to repeat his successful raid on the blockade in May 1917. Horthy envisioned a major attack on the Allied forces with his four Tegetthoff-class ships providing the largest component of the assault. They would be accompanied by the three ships of the Erzherzog Karl-class pre-dreadnoughts, three Novara-class cruisers, Admiral Spaun, four Tátra-class destroyers, and four torpedo boats. Submarines and aircraft would also be employed in the operation to hunt down enemy ships on the flanks of the fleet.

On 8 June 1918 Horthy took his flagship, Viribus Unitis, and Prinz Eugen south with the lead elements of his fleet. On the evening of 9 June, Szent István and Tegetthoff followed along with their own escort ships. Horthy's plan called for Novara and Helgoland to engage the Barrage with the support of the Tátra-class destroyers. Meanwhile, Admiral Spaun and Saida would be escorted by the fleet's four torpedo boats to Otranto to bombard Italian air and naval stations. The German and Austro-Hungarian submarines would be sent to Valona and Brindisi to ambush Italian, French, British, and American warships that sailed out to engage the Austro-Hungarian fleet, while seaplanes from Cattaro would provide air support and screen the ships' advance. The battleships, and in particular the Tegetthoffs, would use their firepower to destroy the Barrage and engage any Allied warships they ran across. Horthy hoped that the inclusion of these ships would prove to be critical in securing a decisive victory.

En route to the harbour at Islana, north of Ragusa, to rendezvous with the battleships Viribus Unitis and Prinz Eugen for the coordinated attack on the Otranto Barrage, Szent István and Tegetthoff attempted to make maximum speed in order to catch up to the rest of the fleet. In doing so, Szent István's turbines started to overheat and speed had to be reduced. When an attempt was made to raise more steam in order to increase the ship's speed, Szent István produced an excess of smoke. At about 3:15 am on 10 June, (Note: There is some debate on what was the exact time when the attack took place. Sieche states that the time was 3:15 am when Szent István was hit while Sokol claims that the time was 3:30 am.) two Italian MAS boats, MAS 15 and MAS 21, spotted the smoke from the Austrian ships while returning from an uneventful patrol off the Dalmatian coast. Both boats successfully penetrated the escort screen and split to engage each of the dreadnoughts. MAS 15 fired her two torpedoes successfully at 3:25 am at Szent István. Szent István was hit by two 45-centimetre (18 in) torpedoes abreast her boiler rooms. Tegetthoff attempted to take Szent István in tow, which failed. At 6:12 am, with the pumps unequal to the task, Szent István capsized off Premuda.

Fearing further attacks by torpedo boats or destroyers from the Italian navy, and possible Allied dreadnoughts responding to the scene, Horthy believed the element of surprise had been lost and called off the attack, forcing Admiral Spaun back to port. In reality, the Italian torpedo boats had been on a routine patrol, and Horthy's plan had not been betrayed to the Italians as he had feared. The Italians did not even discover that the Austrian dreadnoughts had departed Pola until 10 June when aerial reconnaissance photos revealed that they were no longer there. Nevertheless, the loss of Szent István and the blow to morale it had on the navy forced Horthy to cancel his plans to assault the Otranto Barrage. The Austro-Hungarian ships returned to their bases where they would remain for the rest of the war.

=== End of the war ===
By October 1918 it had become clear that Austria-Hungary was facing defeat in the war. With various attempts to quell nationalist sentiments failing, Emperor Karl I decided to sever Austria-Hungary's alliance with Germany and appeal to the Allied Powers in an attempt to preserve the empire from complete collapse. On 26 October Austria-Hungary informed Germany that their alliance was over. At the same time, the Austro-Hungarian Navy was in the process of tearing itself apart along ethnic and nationalist lines. Horthy was informed on the morning of 28 October that an armistice was imminent, and used this news to maintain order and prevent a mutiny among the fleet. While a mutiny was spared, tensions remained high and morale was at an all-time low. The situation was so stressful for members of the navy that the captain of Prinz Eugen, Alexander Milosevic, committed suicide in his quarters aboard the battleship.

On 29 October the National Council in Zagreb announced Croatia's dynastic ties to Hungary had come to a formal conclusion. The National Council also called for Croatia and Dalmatia to be unified, with Slovene and Bosnian organisations pledging their loyalty to the newly formed government. This new provisional government, while throwing off Hungarian rule, had not yet declared independence from Austria-Hungary. Thus Emperor Karl I's government in Vienna asked the newly formed State of Slovenes, Croats and Serbs for help maintaining the fleet stationed at Pola and keeping order among the navy. The National Council refused to assist unless the Austro-Hungarian Navy was first placed under its command. Emperor Karl I, still attempting to save the Empire from collapse, agreed to the transfer, provided that the other "nations" which made up Austria-Hungary would be able to claim their fair share of the value of the fleet at a later time. All sailors not of Slovene, Croatian, Bosnian, or Serbian background were placed on leave for the time being, while the officers were given the choice of joining the new navy or retiring.

The Austro-Hungarian government thus decided to hand over the bulk of its fleet to the State of Slovenes, Croats and Serbs without a shot being fired. This was considered preferential to handing the fleet to the Allies, as the new state had declared its neutrality. Furthermore, the newly formed state had also not yet publicly dethroned Emperor Karl I, keeping the possibility of reforming the Empire into a triple monarchy alive. The transfer to the State of Slovenes, Croats and Serbs began on the morning of 31 October, with Horthy meeting representatives from the South Slav nationalities aboard his flagship, Viribus Unitis in Pola. After "short and cool" negotiations, the arrangements were settled and the handover was completed that afternoon. The Austro-Hungarian Naval Ensign was struck from Viribus Unitis, and was followed by the remaining ships in the harbour. Control over the battleship, and the head of the newly established navy for the State of Slovenes, Croats and Serbs, fell to Captain Janko Vuković, who was raised to the rank of admiral and took over Horthy's old responsibilities as Commander-in-Chief of the Fleet.

=== Post-war ===
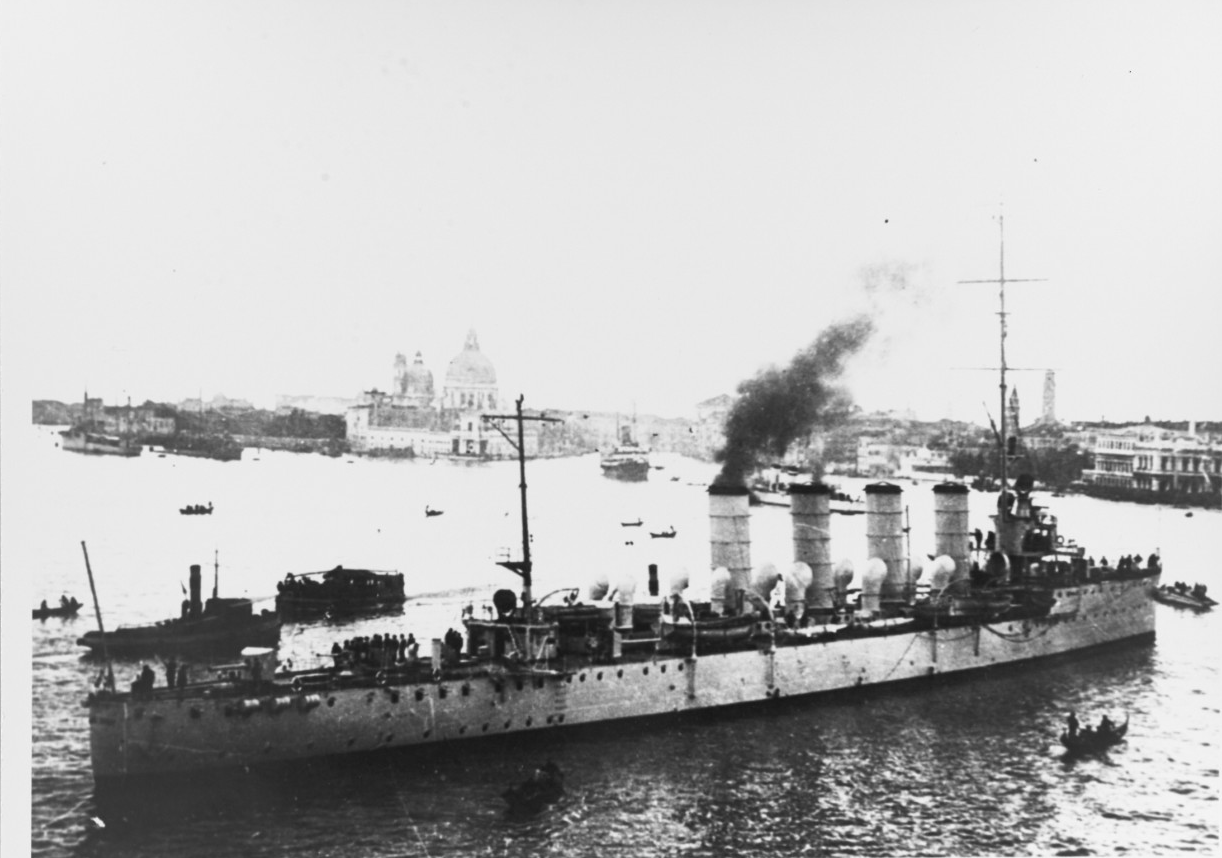
Admiral Spaun participating in the Italian victory celebrations in Venice in March 1919

On 3 November the Austro-Hungarian government signed the Armistice of Villa Giusti with Italy, ending the fighting along the Italian Front. The Armistice refused to recognize the transfer of Austria-Hungary's warships to the State of Slovenes, Croats and Serbs. As a result, on 4 November, Italian ships sailed into the ports of Trieste, Pola, and Fiume. On 5 November, Italian troops occupied the naval installations at Pola. While the State of Slovenes, Croats and Serbs attempted to hold onto their ships, they lacked the men and officers to do so as most sailors who were not South Slavs had already gone home. The National Council did not order any men to resist the Italians, but they also condemned Italy's actions as illegitimate. On 9 November, all remaining ships in Pola harbour had the Italian flag raised. At a conference at Corfu, the Allied Powers agreed the transfer of Austria-Hungary's Navy to the State of Slovenes, Croats and Serbs could not be accepted, despite sympathy from the United Kingdom. Faced with the prospect of being given an ultimatum to surrender the former Austro-Hungarian warships, the National Council agreed to hand over the ships beginning on 10 November.

While under Italian custody, Admiral Spaun sailed into Venice in March 1919 as part of an Italian victory parade, alongside the captured battleships Tegetthoff and Erzherzog Franz Ferdinand. All three entered the Venice Lagoon flying the Italian flag, and were escorted into the port where they were displayed as war trophies by the Italians. It would take a year for the final disposition of the ships to be settled by the Allied powers through the Treaty of Saint-Germain-en-Laye. The United Kingdom was ceded Admiral Spaun under the terms of the treaty. Much like the larger battleships of the Austro-Hungarian Navy, however, Admiral Spaun's post-war service would be short. The same year the British were granted possession of the cruiser, she was sold for scrap to Italian ship breakers and broken up between 1920 and 1921.
