= SMS Prinz Eugen (1912) =

Austro-Hungarian dreadnought battleship

- Prinz Eugen underway

History

Austria-Hungary
- Name: Prinz Eugen
- Namesake: Prince Eugene of Savoy
- Builder: Stabilimento Tecnico Triestino, Trieste
- Cost: 60,600,000 Krone
- Laid down: 16 January 1912
- Launched: 30 November 1912
- Commissioned: 8 July 1914
- In service: 1914–1918
- Out of service: 1918
- Home port: Pola
- Fate: Transferred to State of Slovenes, Croats and Serbs on 31 October 1918

State of Slovenes, Croats and Serbs
- Name: Prinz Eugen
- Acquired: 31 October 1918
- Fate: Handed over to the Allied powers on 10 November 1918

France
- Name: Prinz Eugen
- Acquired: 25 August 1920
- Fate: Ceded to France under the Treaty of Saint-Germain-en-Laye in 1920, sunk as a target ship on 28 June 1922

General characteristics
- Class & type: Tegetthoff-class battleship
- Displacement: 20,000 t (19,684 long tons; 22,046 short tons) designed; 21,689 t (21,346 long tons; 23,908 short tons) full load
- Length: 152 m (498 ft 8 in)
- Beam: 27.90 m (91 ft 6 in)
- Draft: 8.70 m (28 ft 7 in)
- Installed power: 26,400 or 27,000 shp (19,700 or 20,100 kW); 12 boilers
- Propulsion: 4 shafts; 4 steam turbine sets
- Speed: 20 knots (37 km/h; 23 mph) (Note: It is estimated based on the propulsion of Prinz Eugen that a speed of 20 knots (37 km/h; 23 mph) was attainable, and in March 1913 it was reported that the speed trials of Prinz Eugen's sister ship Tegetthoff produced a top speed of 19.75 knots (36.58 km/h; 22.73 mph). Official records for the speed trials of all four ships of the Tegetthoff class were lost at the end of the war.)
- Range: 4,200 nmi (7,800 km; 4,800 mi) at 10 knots (19 km/h; 12 mph)
- Complement: 1,087
- Armament: 12 × 30.5 cm (12 in) guns; 12 × 15 cm (5.9 in) guns; 18 × 7 cm (2.8 in) guns; 3 × 66 mm AA guns; 2 × 66 mm (2.6 in) L/18 landing guns; 4 × 533 mm (21 in) torpedo tubes
- Armor: Belt: 150 to 280 millimetres (6 to 11 in); Turrets: 60 to 280 millimetres (2 to 11 in); Deck: 30 to 48 millimetres (1 to 2 in); Casemates: 180 millimetres (7 in)

SMS Prinz Eugen (His Majesty's Ship Prinz Eugen) (Note: "SMS" stands for "Seiner Majestät Schiff ", or "His Majesty's Ship" in German.) was the third of four Tegetthoff-class dreadnought battleships built for the Austro-Hungarian Navy. Prinz Eugen was named for Prince Eugene of Savoy, a Habsburg general and statesman during the 17th and 18th centuries most notable for defeating the Ottoman Empire at the Battle of Zenta in 1697. The ship was armed with a main battery of twelve 30.5 cm (12.0 in) guns in four triple turrets. Constructed shortly before World War I, she was built at the Stabilimento Tecnico Triestino shipyard in Trieste, where she was laid down in January 1912 and launched in November that same year.

Commissioned into the Austro-Hungarian Navy just 10 days after the assassination of Archduke Franz Ferdinand, Prinz Eugen was a member of the 1st Battleship Division of the Austro-Hungarian Navy at the beginning of the war alongside the other ships of her class, and was stationed out of the Austro-Hungarian naval base at Pola. She first saw action during the Bombardment of Ancona following Italy's declaration of war on Austria-Hungary in May 1915, but saw little combat for the rest of the war due to the Otranto Barrage, which prevented the Austro-Hungarian Navy from leaving the Adriatic Sea. In June 1918, in a bid to earn safer passage for German and Austro-Hungarian U-boats through the Strait of Otranto, the Austro-Hungarian Navy attempted to break the Barrage with a major attack on the strait, but it was abandoned after Prinz Eugen's sister ship, Szent István, was sunk by torpedoes launched from the Italian torpedo boat MAS-15 on 10 June.

After the sinking of Szent István, Prinz Eugen and the remaining two ships of her class, Viribus Unitis and Tegetthoff, returned to port in Pola where they remained for the rest of the war. Facing defeat in the war in October 1918, the Austro-Hungarian government decided to transfer the bulk of its navy to the newly formed State of Slovenes, Croats and Serbs in order to avoid having to hand the ship over to the Allies. This transfer however was not recognized by the Armistice of Villa Giusti, signed between Austria-Hungary and the Allies in November 1918. Under the terms of the Treaty of Saint-Germain-en-Laye, Prinz Eugen was handed over to France. The French Navy subsequently removed the main armament of Prinz Eugen for inspection before using the battleship as a target ship. After being first used to test aerial bombardment attacks, Prinz Eugen was sunk by the battleships Paris, Jean Bart, and France off Toulon on 28 June 1922, exactly eight years after the assassination of Archduke Franz Ferdinand.

== Background ==
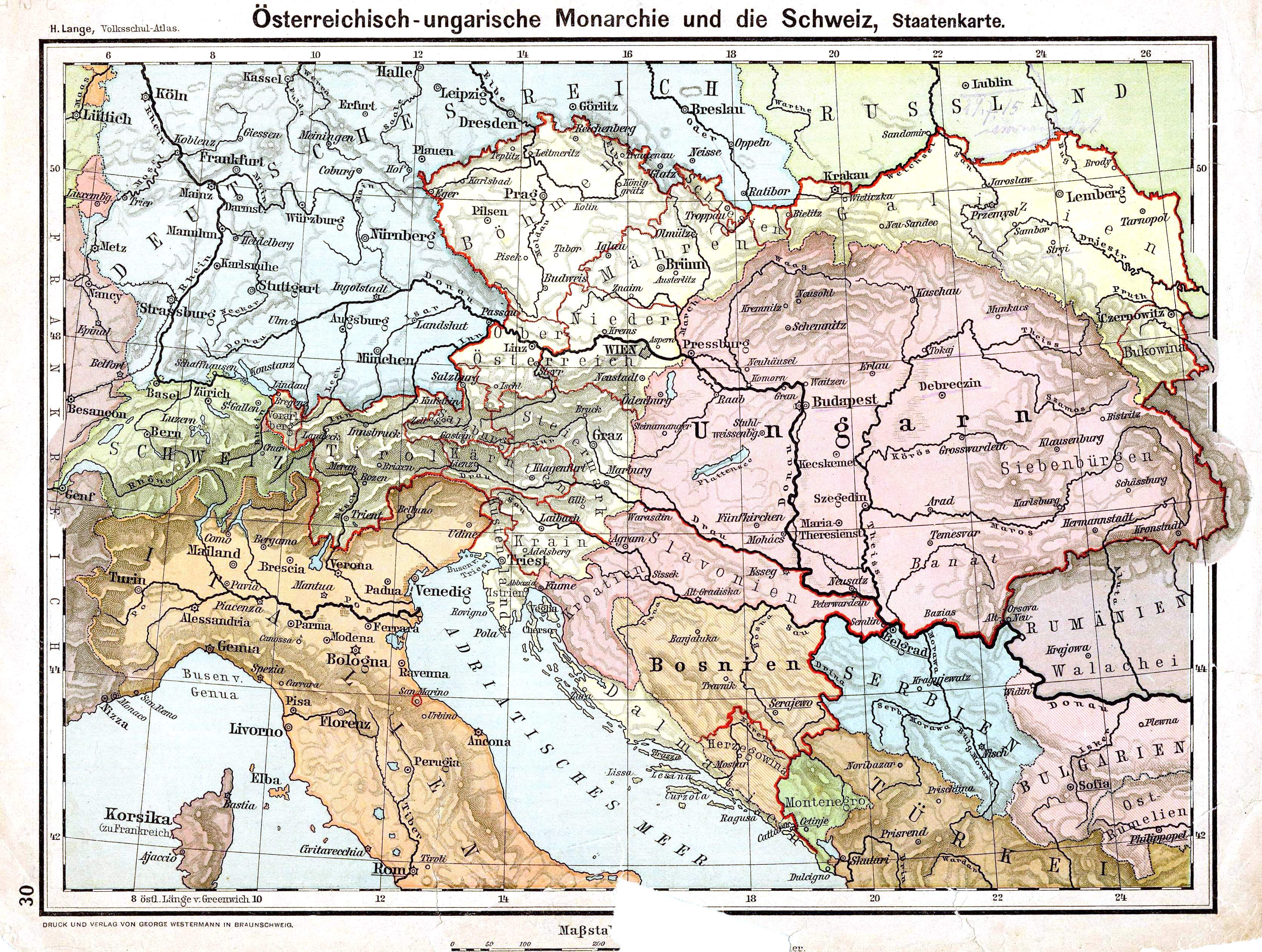
A map of Austria-Hungary and Italy in 1899, with the Adriatic Sea lying between them

Before the construction of Prinz Eugen and the other three ships of the Tegetthoff class, most of Austria-Hungary's previous battleships had been designed for the defense of the Empire's coastline. During the 19th-century, sea power had not been a priority in Austrian foreign policy. As a result, the relatively small Austro-Hungarian Navy had little public interest or support. However, the appointment of Archduke Franz Ferdinand – heir to the Austro-Hungarian throne and a prominent and influential supporter of naval expansion – to the position of admiral in September 1902 greatly increased the importance of the navy in the eyes of both the general public and the Austrian and Hungarian Parliaments. Franz Ferdinand's interest in naval affairs were largely motivated from his belief that a strong navy would be necessary to compete with Italy, which he viewed as Austria-Hungary's greatest regional threat.

In 1904, the Austro-Hungarian Navy began an expansion program intended to equal that of the other Great Powers of Europe. This naval expansion program coincided with the establishment of the Austrian Naval League in September 1904 and the appointment of Vice-Admiral Rudolf Montecuccoli to the posts of Commander-in-Chief of the Navy (German: Marinekommandant) and Chief of the Naval Section of the War Ministry (German: Chef der Marinesektion) in October that same year. After Montecuccoli's appointment, the Admiral worked to pursued the efforts championed by his predecessor, Admiral Hermann von Spaun, and pushed for a greatly expanded and modernized navy.

The origins of Prinz Eugen and the Tegetthoff-class ships can also be found in developments in the first decade of the 20th century which greatly increased the importance of sea power in Austro-Hungarian naval policy. Between 1906 and 1907, railroads linking Trieste and the Dalmatian coastline to the interior of the Empire had been constructed through Austria's Alpine passes. Additionally, lower tariffs on the port of Trieste allowed for a rapid expansion of the city and a similar growth in Austria-Hungary's merchant marine. As Austria-Hungary became more connected to naval affairs than in past decades, a new line of battleships would be necessary to match the Empire's growing naval interests.

Prinz Eugen and her sister ships were first envisioned in the middle of a heated naval arms race between Austria-Hungary and its nominal ally, Italy. Since the Battle of Lissa in 1866, Italy's Regia Marina was considered the most-important naval power in the region which Austria-Hungary measured itself against, often unfavorably. The disparity between the Austro-Hungarian and Italian navies had existed since the unification of Italy; in the late 1880s Italy had the third-largest fleet in the world, behind the French Republic's Navy and the British Royal Navy. While the disparity between Italian and Austro-Hungarian naval strength had been somewhat equalized with the Russian Imperial Navy and the German Kaiserliche Marine surpassing the Italian Navy in 1893 and in 1894, Italy had once again regained the initiative by the turn of the century. In 1903, the year before Montecuccoli's appointment, Italy had 18 battleships in commission or under construction compared to 6 Austro-Hungarian battleships.

Following the construction of the final two Regina Elena-class battleships in 1903, the Italian Navy elected to construct a series of large cruisers rather than additional battleships. Furthermore, a major scandal involving the Terni steel works' armor contracts led to a government investigation that postponed several naval construction programs for three years. These delays meant that the Italian Navy would not initiate construction on another battleship until 1909, and provided the Austro-Hungarian Navy an attempt to even the disparity between the two fleets. The construction of Prinz Eugen and the Tegetthoff class as a whole can thus be viewed in the context of the naval rivalry between Austria-Hungary and Italy, with the ship playing a role in a larger attempt by Austria-Hungary to compete with Italy's naval power.

=== Austro-Italian naval arms race ===
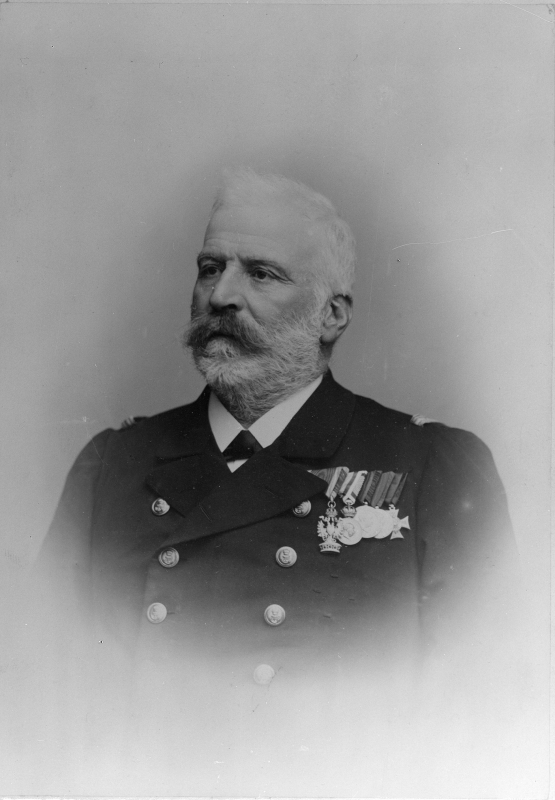
Rudolf Montecuccoli, Marinekommandant of the Austro-Hungarian Navy from 1904 to 1913

The revolution in naval technology created by the launch of the British HMS Dreadnought in 1906 and the Anglo-German naval arms race that followed had a tremendous impact on the development of future battleships around the world, including Prinz Eugen. Dreadnought, armed with ten large-caliber guns, was the first of a revolutionary new standard of "all-big-gun" battleships that rendered pre-dreadnought battleships obsolete. As a result, the value of older battleships declined rapidly in the years after 1906. This development gave Austria-Hungary the opportunity to make up for neglecting its navy in past years. Furthermore, Austria-Hungary's improved financial situation following the Austro-Hungarian Compromise of 1867 were beginning to reflect in the form of larger budgets being allocated to the Empire's armed forces. Political will also existed to construct Austria-Hungary's own dreadnought battleship, as both Archduke Ferdinand and Admiral Montecuccoli were supportive of constructing a new class of modern battleships. As a result, by 1908 the stage was set for the creation of Prinz Eugen and the Tegetthoff class.

Shortly after assuming command as Chief of the Navy, Montecuccoli drafted his first proposal for a modern Austrian fleet in the spring of 1905. While these plans were ambitious and included 12 battleships, none of the ships approached the eventual size of Prinz Eugen. Additional proposals came from outside the Naval Section of the War Ministry. Two proposals from Slovenian politician Ivan Šusteršič, and the Austrian Naval League in 1905 and 1909 included battleships which were close to the size of Prinz Eugen. While Šusteršič's plan lacked the large-caliber guns that would later be found on Prinz Eugen, the plans submitted by the Austrian Naval League three dreadnoughts of 19,000 tonnes (18,700 long tons), similar to Prinz Eugen's eventual displacement of 20,000 t (19,684 long tons). These plans were justified by the League by pointing out that newer battleships were necessary to protect Austria-Hungary's growing merchant marine, and that Italian naval spending was twice that of Austria-Hungary's.

Following the construction of Austria-Hungary's last class of pre-dreadnought battleships, the Radetzky class, Montecuccoli submitted a proposal which would include the first design for Prinz Eugen. With the threat of war with Italy from the Bosnian Crisis in 1908 fresh in the minds of the Austro-Hungarian military, Montecuccoli delivered a memorandum to Emperor Franz Joseph I in January 1909 proposing an enlarged Austro-Hungarian Navy consisting of 16 battleships, 12 cruisers, 24 destroyers, 72 seagoing torpedo boats, and 12 submarines. The most notable change in this memorandum compared to Monteccucoli's previous draft from 1905 was the inclusion of four additional dreadnought battleships with a displacement of 20,000 tonnes (19,684 long tons) at load. One of these ships would eventually become Prinz Eugen.

== Plans and budget ==
Montecuccoli's memorandum would eventually be leaked to Italian newspapers just three months after obtaining approval from Emperor Franz Joseph I. The Italian reaction to the Austro-Hungarian plans was swift, and in June 1909, the Italian dreadnought battleship Dante Alighieri was laid down at the naval shipyard in Castellammare di Stabia.

While Dante Alighieri was being worked on in Italy, Austria-Hungary's own plans for Prinz Eugen and the other ships of her class remained on paper. Funding necessary to begin construction was not to be had either, due to the collapse of Sándor Wekerle's government in Budapest. This left the Hungarian Diet without a prime minister for nearly a year. With no government in Budapest to pass a budget, the money necessary to pay for the ships could not be obtained. As a result, the largest shipbuilding enterprises in Austria-Hungary, the Witkowitz Ironworks and the Škoda Works, offered to begin construction on the first three ships of the Tegetthoff class, Viribus Unitis, Tegetthoff, and Prinz Eugen at their own financial risk, in return for assurances that the Austro-Hungarian government would purchase the battleships as soon as funds were available. After negotiations which involved the Austro-Hungarian joint ministries of foreign affairs, war and finance, the offer was agreed to by Montecuccoli, but the number of dreadnoughts constructed under this arrangement was reduced to just Tegetthoff and Viribus Unitis. In his memoirs, former Austrian Field Marshal and Chief of the General Staff Conrad von Hötzendorf wrote that due to his belief that a war with Italy in the near future was likely, construction on the battleships should begin as soon as possible. He also worked to secure agreements to sell both Tegetthoff and Viribus Unitis to, in his words, a "reliable ally" (which only Germany could claim to be) should the budget crisis in Budapest fail to be settled quickly.

=== Outline ===
Although smaller than the contemporary dreadnought and super-dreadnought battleships of the German Kaiserliche Marine and the British Royal Navy, Prinz Eugen was part of the first class of its type in the Mediterranean and Adriatic Seas. Prinz Eugen and her sister ships were described by former Austro-Hungarian naval officer Anthony Sokol in his book The Imperial and Royal Austro-Hungarian Navy as "excellent ships", and she was knowledged as one of the most powerful battleships in the region. The design of the battleship also signaled a change in Austro-Hungarian naval policy, as she was capable of far more than coastal defense or patrolling the Adriatic Sea. Indeed, Prinz Eugen and her sister ships were so well received that when the time came to plan for the replacement of Austria-Hungary's old Monarch-class coastal defense ships, the navy elected to simply take the layout of her class and enlarge them to have a slightly greater tonnage and larger main guns.

=== Funding ===
The cost to construct Prinz Eugen was enormous by the standards of the Austro-Hungarian Navy. While the Habsburg-class, Erzherzog Karl-class, and the Radetzky-class battleships cost the navy roughly 18, 26, and 40 million krone per ship, Prinz Eugen was projected to cost over 60 million krone. Under the previous budgets for 1907 and 1908, the navy had been allocated some 63.4 and 73.4 million krone, which at the time was considered an inflated budget due to the construction of two Radetzkys. Montecuccoli worried that the general public and the legislatures in Vienna and Budapest would reject the need for a ship as expensive as Prinz Eugen, especially so soon after the political crisis in Budapest. The dramatic increase in spending meant that in 1909 the navy spent some 100.4 million krone, a huge sum at the time. This was done in order to rush the completion of the Radetzky-class battleships, though the looming construction of three other dreadnoughts in addition to Prinz Eugen meant the Austro-Hungarian Navy would likely have to ask the government for a yearly budget much higher than 100 million krone. A secret agreement to fund construction of Viribus Unitis and Tegetthoff, Prinz Eugen's sister ships, was struck with the Rothschild family in Austria, who owned the Witkowitz Ironworks, the Creditanstalt Bank, and had significant assets in both the Škoda Works and the Stabilimento Tecnico Triestino. Archduke Franz Ferdinand personally courted Albert Salomon Anselm von Rothschild to obtain his family's monetary support until the government could buy Prinz Eugen's two older sister ships.

Facing potential backlash over constitutional concerns that constructing two Tegetthoff-class battleships committed Austria-Hungary to spend roughly 120 million Krone without prior approval by either the Austrian Reichsrat or the Diet of Hungary, the deal remained secret. The agreement was ultimately leaked to the public in April 1910 by the Arbeiter-Zeitung, the newspaper of Austria's Social Democratic Party. However, by the time the Arbeiter-Zeitung broke the story, the plans had already been finalized on the Tegetthoff-class battleship and construction on Prinz Eugen's two sister ships was about to begin.

== General characteristics ==
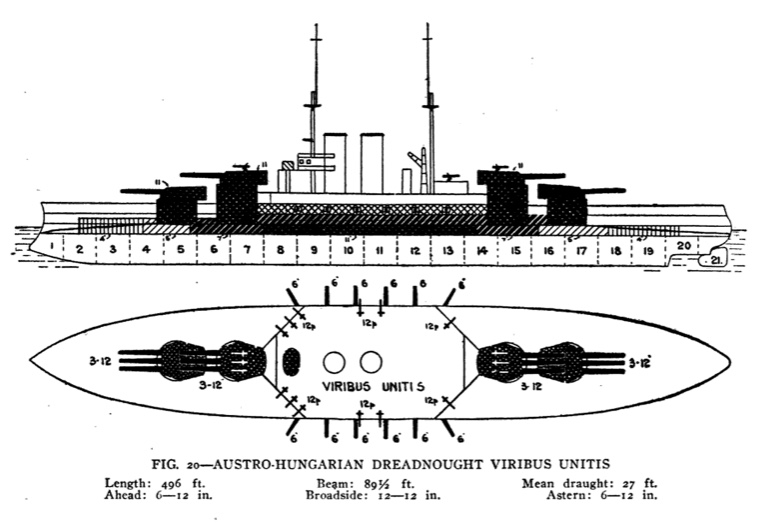
A line drawing of the Tegetthoff class

Designed by naval architect Siegfried Popper, Prinz Eugen had an overall length of 152 metres (498 ft 8 in), with a beam of 27.90 metres (91 ft 6 in) and a draught of 8.70 metres (28 ft 7 in) at deep load. She was designed to displace 20,000 tonnes (19,684 long tons; 22,046 short tons) at load, but at full combat load she displaced 21,689 tonnes (21,346 long tons; 23,908 short tons). Prinz Eugen's hull was built with a double bottom, 1.22 metres (4 ft 0 in) deep, with a reinforced inner bottom that consisted of two layers of 25-millimetre (1 in) plates.

The hull design was intended by Popper to protect the battleship from naval mines, though it ultimately failed Prinz Eugen's sister ships, Szent István and Viribus Unitis, when the former was sunk by a torpedo in June 1918 and the later by a mine in November of that same year. Prinz Eugen also featured two 2.74-metre (9 ft 0 in) Barr and Stroud optical rangefinder posts on both the starboard and port sides for the secondary guns of the battleship. These rangefinders were equipped with an armored cupola, which housed an 8-millimetre (0.31 in) Schwarzlose M.07/12 anti-aircraft machine gun. Prinz Eugen was equipped with torpedo nets, though they were removed in June 1917.

=== Propulsion ===
Prinz Eugen possessed four shafts and four Parsons steam turbines, which were housed in a separate engine-room and powered by twelve Babcock & Wilcox boilers. They were designed to produce a total of 26,400 or 27,000 shaft horsepower (19,686 or 20,134 kW), which was theoretically enough to attain a maximum designed speed of 20 knots (37 km/h; 23 mph). It was reported during her speed trials that she attained a top speed of 19.75 knots (36.58 km/h; 22.73 mph), though her actual top speed is unknown as the official sea trial data and records for all ships of the Prinz Eugen class were lost after the war. Prinz Eugen also carried 1,844.5 tonnes (1,815.4 long tons; 2,033.2 short tons) of coal, and an additional 267.2 tonnes (263.0 long tons; 294.5 short tons) of fuel oil that was to be sprayed on the coal to increase its burn rate. At full capacity, Prinz Eugen could steam for 4,200 nautical miles (7,800 km; 4,800 mi) at a speed of 10 knots (19 km/h; 12 mph).

=== Armament ===
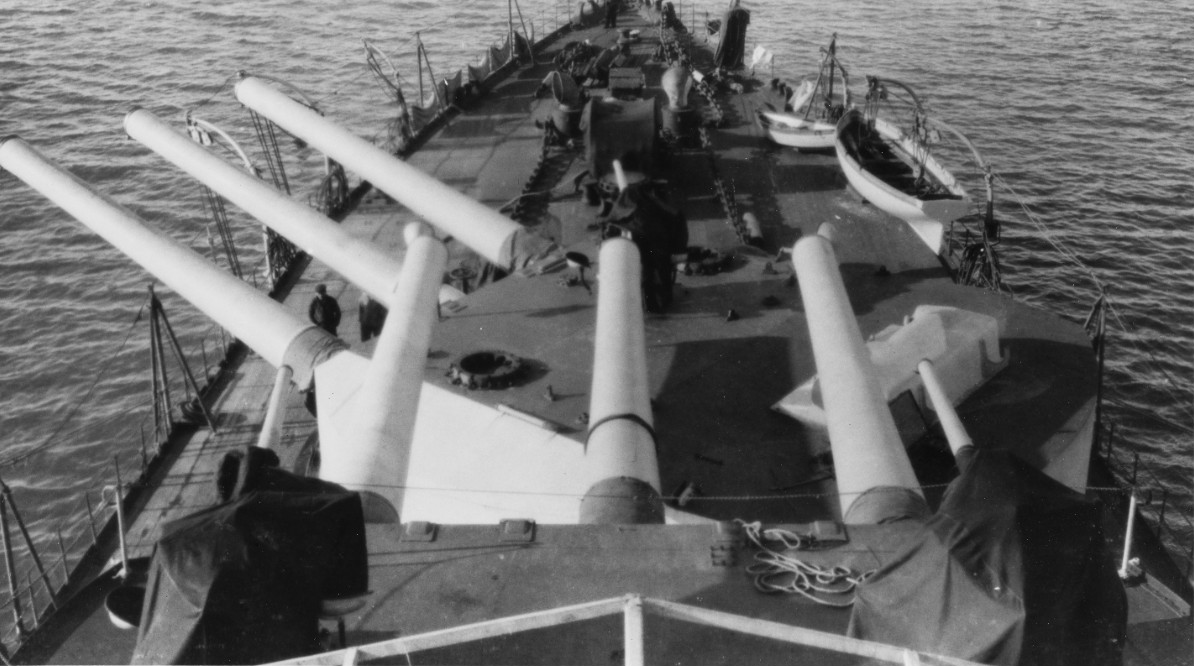
The guns of Prinz Eugen shortly after World War I

Constructed at the Škoda Works in Plzeň, Bohemia, Prinz Eugen's main battery consisted of twelve 45-calibre 30.5-centimetre (12 in) Škoda K10 guns mounted in four triple turrets. Two turrets each were mounted forward and aft of the ship's main superstructure in a superfiring pair. The implementation of triple turrets aboard Prinz Eugen came about for two reasons: the need to ensure the ship had a more-compact design and smaller displacement to conform to Austro-Hungarian naval doctrine and budget constraints, and to counter the implementation of triple turrets on the Italian Dante Alighieri. Having three guns on each turret rather than two made it possible to deliver a heavier broadside than other dreadnoughts of a similar size and meant a shorter citadel and better weight distribution.

Prinz Eugen carried a secondary armament which consisted of a dozen 50-calibre 15-centimetre (5.9 in) Škoda K10 guns mounted in casemates amidships. Additionally, eighteen 50-calibre 7-centimetre (2.8 in) Škoda K10 guns were mounted on open pivot mounts on the upper deck, above the casemates. Three more 7-centimetre (2.8 in) Škoda K10 guns were mounted on the upper turrets for anti-aircraft duties. Two additional 8-millimetre (0.31 in) Schwarzlose M.07/12 anti-aircraft machine guns were mounted atop the armored cupolas of her rangefinders. Prinz Eugen was also equipped with two 7-centimetre (2.8 in) Škoda G. L/18 landing guns, and two 47-millimetre (1.9 in) Škoda SFK L/44 S guns for use against small and fast vessels such as torpedo boats and submarines. Furthermore, she also fitted with four 533-millimetre (21.0 in) submerged torpedo tubes, one each in the bow, the stern, and each side. Complementing these torpedo tubes, Prinz Eugen usually carried twelve torpedoes.

=== Armor ===
Diagram of Prinz Eugen's main armament

Prinz Eugen was protected at the waterline with an armor belt which measured 280 millimetres (11 in) thick in the central citadel, where the most-important parts of the ship were located. This armor belt was located between the midpoints of the fore and aft barbettes, and thinned to 150 millimetres (5.9 in) further towards the bow and stern, but did not reach either. It was continued to the bow by a small patch of 110–130-millimetre (4–5 in) armor. The upper armor belt had a maximum thickness of 180 millimetres (7.1 in), but it thinned to 110 millimetres (4.3 in) from the forward barbette all the way to the bow. The casemate armor was also 180 millimetres (7.1 in) thick.

The sides of the main gun turrets, barbettes, and main conning tower were protected by 280 millimetres (11 in) of armor, except for the turret and conning tower roofs which were 60 to 150 millimetres (2 to 6 in) thick. The thickness of the decks ranged from 30 to 48 millimetres (1 to 2 in) in two layers. The underwater protection system consisted of the extension of the double-bottom upwards to the lower edge of the waterline armor belt, with a thin 10-millimetre (0.4 in) plate acting as the outermost bulkhead. It was backed by a torpedo bulkhead that consisted of two 25-millimetre plates. The total thickness of this system was only 1.60 metres (5 ft 3 in) which made Prinz Eugen incapable of containing a torpedo warhead detonation or mine explosion without rupturing. This design flaw would ultimately prove to be fatal to her sister ships Szent István and Viribus Unitis.

== Construction ==
Prinz Eugen being launched in Trieste on 30 November 1912

Montecuccoli's plans for the construction of Prinz Eugen and her sister ships earned the approval of Emperor Franz Joseph I in January 1909, and by April plans for the design and construction of the ship was laid out. Roughly a year after Prinz Eugen's plans were drafted, Arbeiter-Zeitung, the Austrian Social Democratic Party newspaper, reported the details of the battleship to the general public. The Christian Social Party, supportive of the construction of Prinz Eugen and her sister ships, and operating on the advice of the navy, published in its own newspaper, Reichspost, that the secret project to construct the ships and the related financial agreements to fund the first two were true. The Reichspost lobbied in support of the project, citing Austria-Hungary's national security concerns with an Italian dreadnought already under construction. When the story broke, Archduke Ferdinand also worked to build public support for the construction Prinz Eugen and her sister ships, as did the Austrian Naval League.

=== Assembly and commissioning ===
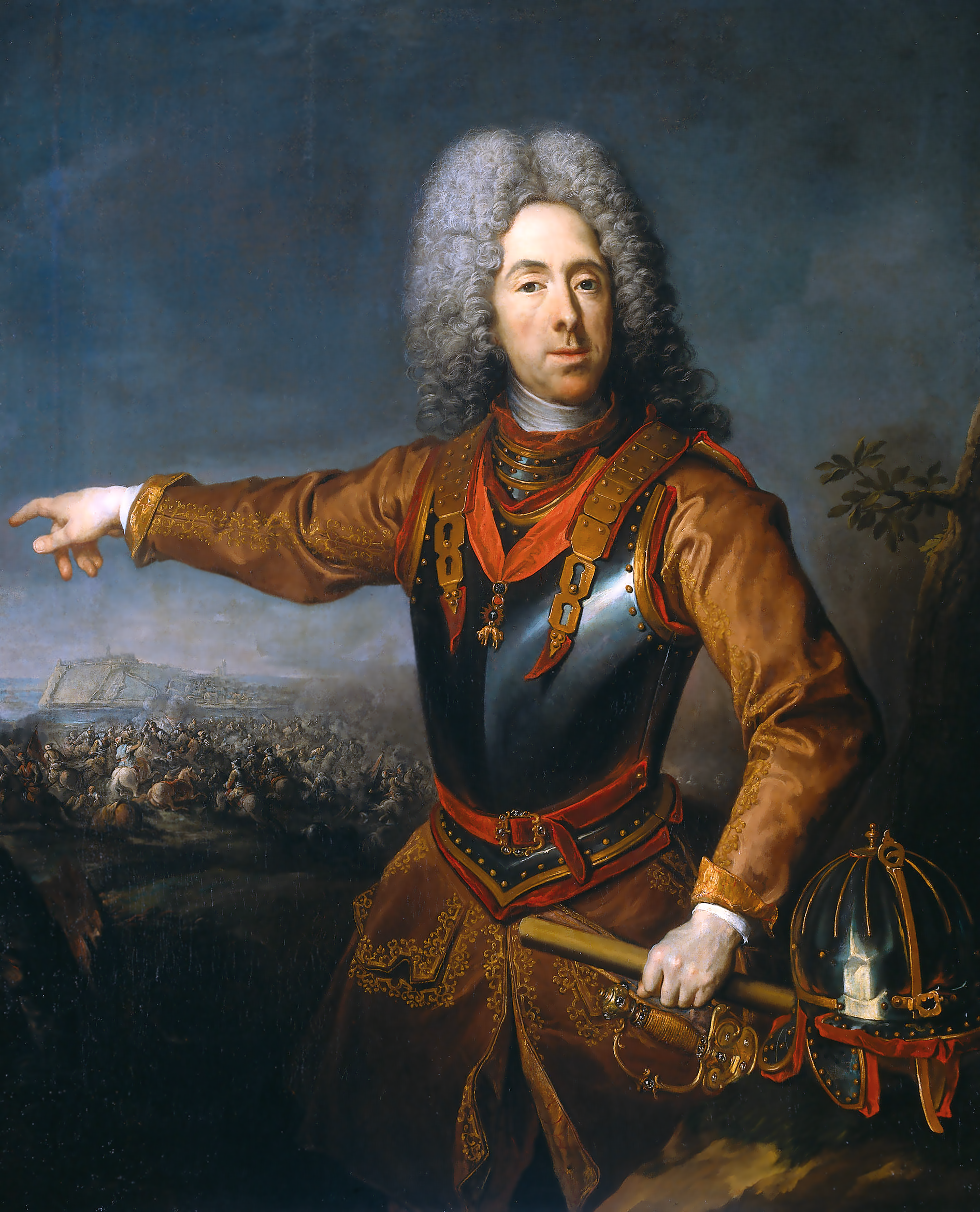
Prince Eugene of Savoy, namesake of the battleship Prinz Eugen

Prinz Eugen, the third ship of her class, was laid down in Trieste by Stabilimento Tecnico Triestino on 16 January 1912. The budget agreement which funded Prinz Eugen stipulated that while the armor and guns of the battleship were to be constructed within Austria, the electrical wiring and equipment aboard the battleship was to be assembled in Hungary. Additionally, half of all ammunition and shells for the guns of the ship would be purchased in Austria, while the other half was to be bought in Hungary. Despite two strikes by machinists in August 1912 and March 1913 which delayed construction of Prinz Eugen's engines, the battleship was built at a very fast pace. Following just 11 months of construction, she was launched on 30 November 1912 in Trieste.

Originally referred to as "Battleship VI", discussion began over what to name the battleship while it was under construction in Trieste. While several proposals circulated around the Naval Section of the War Ministry, all proposed names for the four ships of the Tegetthoff class included Prinz Eugen as a ship name. Newspapers within Austria reported during construction that one of the ships was to be named Kaiser Franz Joseph I were unfounded as the Austro-Hungarian Navy had no intentions of renaming the cruiser which already bore the Emperor's name. Emperor Franz Joseph I ultimately decided the names of all four dreadnoughts, selecting to name the first ship after his own personal motto, Viribus Unitis (Latin: "With United Forces"), while the second ship would be named Tegetthoff, after Wilhelm von Tegetthoff, a 19th-century Austrian naval admiral known for his victory over Italy at the Battle of Lissa in 1866. The third ship of the class was to be named Prinz Eugen, after Prince Eugene of Savoy, the 17th and 18th century Austrian general and statesman hailed as a hero in Austria for his victory at the Battle of Zenta in 1697. Prinz Eugen conducted sea trials throughout March and April 1914. The results of these trials were described as "satisfactory". While the Austro-Hungarian Navy issued a statement that the ship's trials concluded with successful gunnery tests, no other information was allowed to be published. She was commissioned into the Austro-Hungarian Navy on 8 July 1914, just ten days after the assassination of Archduke Franz Ferdinand.

== History ==
=== World War I ===
==== Outbreak of war ====
Prinz Eugen conducting sea trials before World War I

Events unfolded rapidly in the ensuing days. Austria-Hungary declared war on Serbia on July 28, one month after Franz Ferdinand's assassination. On 30 July 1914 Russia declared full mobilization in response to Austria-Hungary's declaration of war on Serbia. Austria-Hungary declared full mobilization the next day. On 1 August both Germany and France ordered full mobilization and Germany declared war on Russia in support of Austria-Hungary. While relations between Austria-Hungary and Italy had improved greatly in the two years following the 1912 renewal of the Triple Alliance, increased Austro-Hungarian naval spending, political disputes over influence in Albania, and Italian concerns over the potential annexation of land in the Montenegro caused the relationship between the two allies to falter in the months leading up to the war. Italy's declaration of neutrality in the war on 1 August dashed Austro-Hungarian hopes to use Prinz Eugen in major combat operations in the Mediterranean, as the navy had been relying upon coal stored in Italian ports to operate in conjunction with the Regia Marina. By 4 August, Germany was executing the Schlieffen Plan and had already occupied Luxembourg and invaded Belgium after declaring war on France. That same day, the United Kingdom declared war on Germany in support of Belgian neutrality.

The assistance of the Austro-Hungarian fleet was called upon by the German Mediterranean Division, which consisted of the battlecruiser SMS Goeben and light cruiser SMS Breslau. The German ships were attempting to break out of Messina, where they had been taking on coal prior to the outbreak of war. By the first week of August, British ships had begun to assemble off Messina in an attempt to trap the Germans. While Austria-Hungary had not yet fully mobilized its fleet, a force was assembled to assist the German ships. This consisted of Tegetthoff, Viribus Unitis, and Prinz Eugen, as well as three Radetzkys, the armoured cruiser Sankt Georg, the scout cruiser Admiral Spaun, six destroyers, and 13 torpedo boats. The Austro-Hungarian high command, wary of instigating war with Great Britain, ordered the fleet to avoid the British ships and to only support the Germans openly while they were in Austro-Hungarian waters. On 7 August, when the Germans broke out of Messina, the Austro-Hungarian fleet had begun to sail for Brindisi to link up with the Germans and escort their ships to a friendly port in Austria-Hungary. However, the German movement toward the mouth of the Adriatic had been a diversion to throw the British and French off their pursuit, and the German ships instead rounded the southern tip of Greece and made their way to the Dardanelles, where they would eventually be sold to the Ottoman Empire. Rather than follow the German ships towards the Black Sea, the Austrian fleet returned to Pola.

==== 1914–1915 ====
Prinz Eugen in 1914

Following France and Britain's declarations of war on Austria-Hungary on 11 and 12 August respectively, the French Admiral Augustin Boué de Lapeyrère was issued orders to close off Austro-Hungarian shipping at the entrance to the Adriatic Sea and to engage any Austro-Hungarian ships his Anglo-French fleet came across. Lapeyrère chose to attack the Austro-Hungarian ships blockading Montenegro. The ensuing Battle of Antivari ended Austria-Hungary's blockade, and effectively placed the entrance of the Adriatic Sea firmly in the hands of Britain and France.

After the breakout of Goeben and Breslau, Prinz Eugen saw very little action, spending much of her time in port at Pola. The ship's lack of time spent at sea was part of a greater general inactivity among nearly all ships of the Austro-Hungarian Navy. This was partly caused by a fear of mines in the Adriatic, though other factors contributed to the lack of naval activity. Haus was fearful that direct confrontation with the French Navy, even if it should be successful, would weaken the Austro-Hungarian Navy to the point that Italy would have a free hand in the Adriatic. This concern was so great to Haus that he wrote in September 1914, "So long as the possibility exists that Italy will declare war against us, I consider it my first duty to keep our fleet intact." Haus' decision to use the Austro-Hungarian Navy as a fleet in being earned sharp criticism from the Austro-Hungarian Army, the German Navy, and the Austro-Hungarian Foreign Ministry, but it also led to a far greater number of Entente naval forces being devoted to the Mediterranean and the Strait of Otranto. These could have been used elsewhere, such as against the Ottoman Empire during the Gallipoli Campaign.

The most-important factor contributing to Prinz Eugen spending most of her time at port may have been the lack of coal. Prior to the war, the United Kingdom had served as Austria-Hungary's primary source for coal. In the years before the war an increasing percentage of coal had come from mines in Germany, Virginia, and from domestic sources, but 75% of the coal purchased for the Austro-Hungarian Navy came from Britain. The outbreak of war meant that these sources, as well as those from Virginia, would no longer be available. Significant quantities of coal had been stockpiled before the war however, ensuring the navy was capable of sailing out of port if need be. Even so, the necessity of ensuring that Prinz Eugen had the coal she needed in the event of an Italian or French attack or a major offensive operation resulted in her and other battleships remaining at port unless circumstances necessitated their deployment at sea.

In early 1915 Germany suggested that Prinz Eugen and the other battleships of the Austro-Hungarian Navy conduct an attack on the Otranto Barrage in order to relieve pressure on the Ottoman Empire at the height of the Gallipoli Campaign. Haus, still wary of taking Austria-Hungary's battleships out of port, rejected the proposal. He countered that the French had pulled back their blockade to the southernmost end of the Adriatic Sea, and that none of the Anglo-French ships assigned to blockading the strait had been diverted to the Dardanelles.

Haus also advocated strongly in favor of keeping his battleships, in particular all four ships of the Tegetthoff class, in reserve in the event of Italy's entry into the war on the side of the Entente. Haus believed that Italy would inevitably break her alliance with Austria-Hungary and Germany, and that by keeping battleships such as Prinz Eugen safe, they could rapidly be employed against Italy. This strategy enabled Austria-Hungary to engage the Italians shortly after Italy's declaration of war in May 1915.

==== Bombardment of Ancona ====
Prinz Eugen at anchor. Note the seaplane in the upper left

After failed negotiations with Germany and Austria-Hungary over Italy joining the war as a member of the Central Powers, the Italians negotiated with the Triple Entente for Italy's eventual entry into the war on their side in the Treaty of London, signed on 26 April 1915. On 4 May Italy formally renounced her alliance to Germany and Austria-Hungary, giving the Austro-Hungarians advanced warning that Italy was preparing to go to war against them. Haus made preparations for Prinz Eugen and her sister ships to sortie out into the Adriatic in a massive strike against the Italians the moment war was declared. On 23 May 1915, between two and four hours after the Italian declaration of war reached the main Austro-Hungarian naval base at Pola, (Note: There is some debate on when the fleet departed Pola. Halpern states that it was four hours until the fleet set sail while Sokol claims that the fleet left Pola two hours after the declaration reached Admiral Haus.) the Austro-Hungarian fleet, including Prinz Eugen, departed to bombard the Italian coast.

While several ships bombarded secondary targets and others were deployed to the south to screen for Italian ships that could be steaming north from Taranto, the core of the Austro-Hungarian Navy, spearheaded by Prinz Eugen and her sister ships, made their way to Ancona. The bombardment across the province of Ancona was a major success for the Austro-Hungarian Navy. In the port of Ancona, an Italian steamer was destroyed and three others damaged. The infrastructure of the port of Ancona and the surrounding towns was severely damaged. The railroad yard and port facilities in the city were damaged or destroyed, while local shore batteries defending them were knocked out. Multiple wharves, warehouses, oil tanks, radio stations, and coal and oil stores were set on fire by the bombardment, and the city's electricity, gas, and telephone lines were severed. Within the city itself, Ancona's police headquarters, army barracks, military hospital, sugar refinery, and Bank of Italy offices all saw damage. 30 Italian soldiers and 38 civilians were killed, while an additional 150 were wounded in the attack.

The Austro-Hungarian Navy would later move on to bombard the coast of Montenegro, without opposition; by the time Italian ships arrived on the scene, the Austro-Hungarians were safely back in Pola. The objective of the bombardment of Ancona was to delay the Italian Army from deploying its forces along the border with Austria-Hungary by destroying critical transportation systems. The surprise attack on Ancona succeeded in delaying the Italian deployment to the Alps for two weeks. This delay gave Austria-Hungary valuable time to strengthen its Italian border and re-deploy some of its troops from the Eastern and Balkan fronts. The bombardment also delivered a severe blow to Italian military and public morale.

==== 1916–1917 ====
Prinz Eugen underway on a rare departure from port on 28 June 1917

Largely unable to engage in major offensive combat operations after the Bombardment of Ancona due to the Otranto Barrage, Prinz Eugen mostly relegated to defending Austria-Hungary's 1,130 nautical miles (2,090 km; 1,300 mi) coastline and 2,172.4 nautical miles (4,023.3 km; 2,500.0 mi) of island seaboard for the next three years. The lack of combat engagements, or even instances where Prinz Eugen left port, is exemplified by the career of her sister ship, Szent István. The ship was unable to join her sisters in the Bombardment of Ancona and rarely left the safety of the port except for gunnery practice in the nearby Fažana Strait. She only spent 54 days at sea during her 937 days in service and made only a single two-day trip to Pag Island. In total, only 5.7% of her life was spent at sea; and for the rest of the time she swung at anchor in Pola Harbour.

Despite Haus' death from pneumonia on 8 February 1917, his strategy of keeping the Austro-Hungarian Navy, and particularly dreadnoughts like Prinz Eugen, in port continued. By keeping Prinz Eugen and her sister ships as a fleet in being, the Austro-Hungarian Navy would be able to continue to defend its lengthy coastline from naval bombardment or invasion by sea. The major ports of Trieste and Fiume would also remain protected. Furthermore, Italian ships stationed in Venice were effectively trapped by the positioning of the Austro-Hungarian fleet, preventing them from sailing south to join the bulk of the Entente forces at the Otranto Barrage.

Maximilian Njegovan was promoted to admiral and appointed Commander-in-Chief of the Navy to replace Haus. With Njegovan appointed to higher office, command of the First Battle Division, which included that of Prinz Eugen and her sister ships, fell to Vice-Admiral Anton Willenik. Njegovan had previously voiced frustration watching the dreadnoughts he had commanded under Haus sit idle at port, and upon taking command he had some 400,000 tons of coal at his disposal. However, he chose to continue the strategy of his predecessor, ensuring Prinz Eugen would continue to see little to no combat.

Having hardly ever ventured out to port except to conduct gunnery practice for the past two years, the most-significant moments Prinz Eugen experienced while moored in Pola were inspections by dignitaries. The first such visit was conducted by Emperor Karl I on 15 December 1916. During this brief visit the Emperor inspected Pola's naval establishments and Szent István, but he did not board Prinz Eugen. Karl I returned to Pola in June 1917 in the first formal imperial review of the Austro-Hungarian Navy since 1902. The third dignitary visit came during Kaiser Wilhelm II's inspection of Pola's German submarine base on 12 December 1917. Aside from these visits, the only action the port of Pola and Prinz Eugen was subject to between the Bombardment of Ancona and the summer of 1918 were the more than eighty air raids conducted by the newly formed Italian Air Force.

==== 1918 ====
Following the Cattaro Mutiny in February 1918, Admiral Njegovan was fired as Commander-in-Chief of the Navy. Miklós Horthy de Nagybánya, commander of Prinz Eugen, was promoted to rear admiral and named Commander-in-Chief of the Fleet. Horthy used his appointment to take the Austro-Hungarian fleet out of port for maneuvers and gunnery practice on a regular basis. The size of these operations were the largest Prinz Eugen had seen since the outbreak of the war.

These gunnery and maneuver practices were conducted not only to restore order in the wake of several failed mutinies, but also to prepare the fleet for a major offensive operation. Horthy's strategic thinking differed from his two predecessors, and shortly after assuming command of the navy he resolved to undertake a major fleet action in order to address low morale and boredom, and make it easier for Austro-Hungarian and German U-Boats to break out of the Adriatic into the Mediterranean. After several months of practice, Horthy concluded the fleet was ready for a major offensive at the beginning of June 1918.

==== Otranto Raid ====
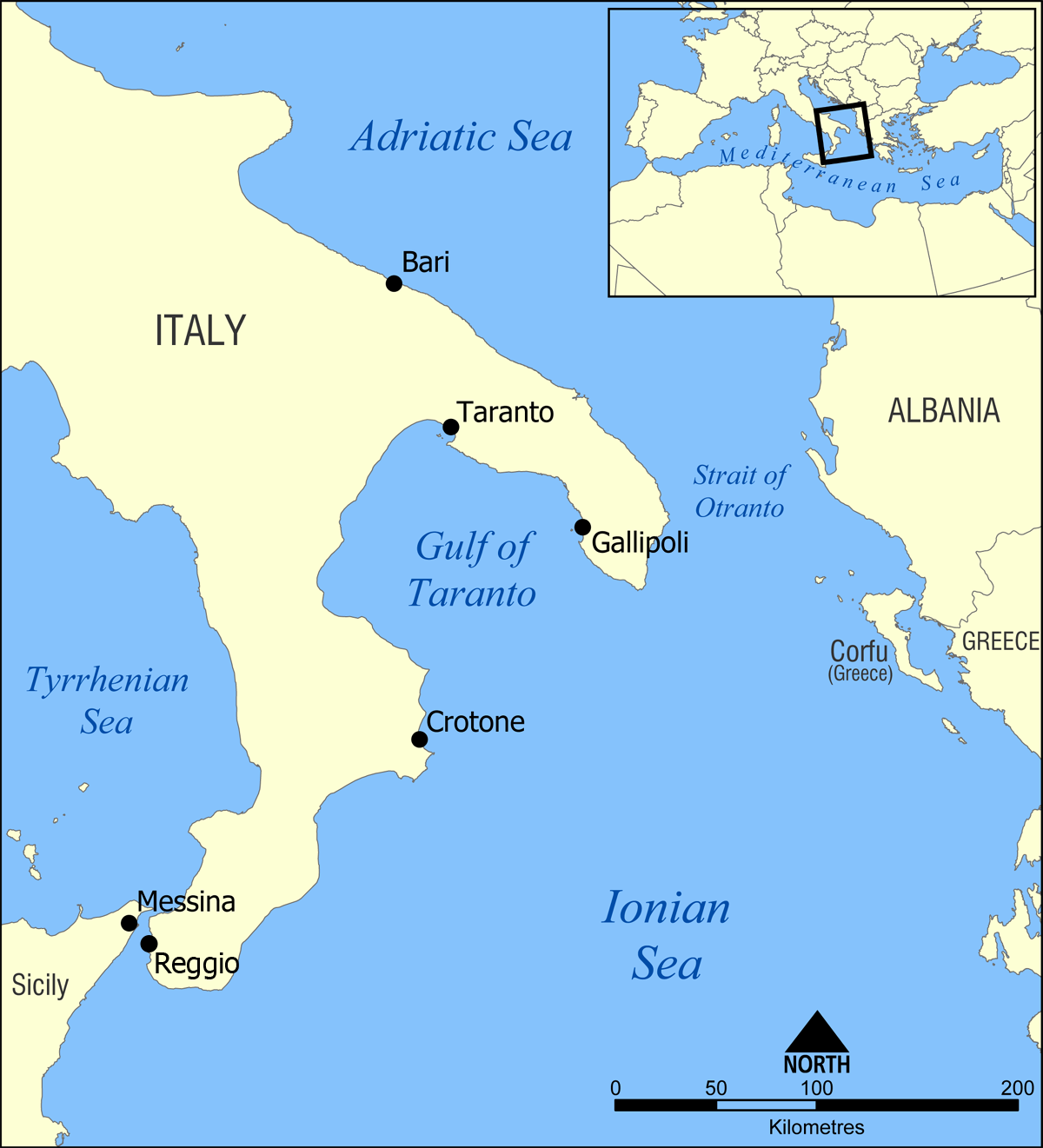
Map showing the location of the Straits of Otranto at the southern end of the Adriatic

Horthy was determined to use the fleet to attack the Otranto Barrage. Planning to repeat his successful raid on the blockade in May 1917, Horthy envisioned a massive attack on the Allied forces with Prinz Eugen and her three sister ships providing the largest component of the assault. They would be accompanied by the three ships of the Erzherzog Karl-class pre-dreadnoughts, the three Novara-class cruisers, the cruiser Admiral Spaun, four Tátra-class destroyers, and four torpedo boats. Submarines and aircraft would also be employed in the operation to hunt down enemy ships on the flanks of the fleet.

On 8 June 1918 Horthy took his flagship, Viribus Unitis, and Prinz Eugen south with the lead elements of his fleet. On the evening of 9 June, Szent István and Tegetthoff followed along with their own escort ships. Horthy's plan called for Novara and Helgoland to engage the Barrage with the support of the Tátra-class destroyers. Meanwhile, Admiral Spaun and Saida would be escorted by the fleet's four torpedo boats to Otranto to bombard Italian air and naval stations. The German and Austro-Hungarian submarines would be sent to Valona and Brindisi to ambush Italian, French, British, and American warships that sailed out to engage the Austro-Hungarian fleet, while seaplanes from Cattaro would provide air support and screen the ships' advance. The battleships, and in particular the dreadnoughts such as Prinz Eugen, would use their firepower to destroy the Barrage and engage any Allied warships they ran across. Horthy hoped that the inclusion of these ships would prove to be critical in securing a decisive victory.

En route to the harbour at Islana, north of Ragusa, to rendezvous with Viribus Unitis and Prinz Eugen for the coordinated attack on the Otranto Barrage, Szent István and Tegetthoff attempted to make maximum speed in order to catch up to the rest of the fleet. In doing so, Szent István's turbines started to overheat, and the speed of the two ships had to be reduced. When an attempt was made to raise more steam in order to increase their speed, Szent István produced an excess of smoke. At about 3:15 am on 10 June, (Note: There is some debate on what was the exact time when the attack took place. Sieche states that the time was 3:15 am when Szent István was hit while Sokol claims that the time was 3:30 am.) two Italian MAS boats, MAS 15 and MAS 21, spotted the smoke from the Austrian ships while returning from an uneventful patrol off the Dalmatian coast. Both boats successfully penetrated the escort screen and split to engage each of the dreadnoughts. MAS 15 fired her two torpedoes successfully at 3:25 am at Szent István. The battleship was hit by two 45-centimetre (18 in) torpedoes abreast her boiler rooms. Efforts to plug the holes in the ship failed. Tegetthoff attempted to take Szent István in tow, but the battleship was taking on too much water. At 6:12 am, with the pumps unequal to the task, Szent István capsized off Premuda. Fearing further attacks by torpedo boats or destroyers from the Italian Regia Marina, and possible Allied dreadnoughts responding to the scene, Horthy believed the element of surprise had been lost and called off the attack. Prinz Eugen and the rest of the fleet returned to the base at Pola where it would remain for the rest of the war.

==== End of the war ====
Pola shortly after the end of World War I. The five ships in line from right to left are the Italian cruiser San Marco, right center, a Radetzky-class battleship, the battleships Prinz Eugen and Tegetthoff, and the French cruiser Waldeck-Rousseau

On 17 July 1918, Pola was struck by the largest air raid the city would see during the war. 66 Allied planes dropped over 200 bombs, though Prinz Eugen was unharmed in the attack.

By October 1918 it had become clear that Austria-Hungary was facing defeat in the war. With various attempts to quell nationalist sentiments failing, Emperor Karl I decided to sever Austria-Hungary's alliance with Germany and appeal to the Allied Powers in an attempt to preserve the empire from complete collapse. On 26 October Austria-Hungary informed Germany that their alliance was over. In Pola the Austro-Hungarian Navy was in the process of tearing itself apart along ethnic and nationalist lines. Horthy was informed on the morning of 28 October that an armistice was imminent, and used this news to maintain order and prevent a mutiny among the fleet. While a mutiny was spared, tensions remained high and morale was at an all-time low. The situation was so stressful that Prinz Eugen's captain, Alexander Milosevic, committed suicide in his quarters aboard the battleship.

On 29 October the National Council in Zagreb announced Croatia's dynastic ties to Hungary had come to a formal conclusion. This new provisional government, while throwing off Hungarian rule, had not yet declared independence from Austria-Hungary. Thus Emperor Karl I's government in Vienna asked the newly formed State of Slovenes, Croats and Serbs for help maintaining the fleet stationed at Pola and keeping order among the navy. Emperor Karl I, attempting to save the Empire from collapse, agreed to transfer all of Austria-Hungary's ships to the National Council, provided that the other "nations" which made up Austria-Hungary would be able to claim their fair share of the value of the fleet at a later time.

The Austro-Hungarian government thus decided to hand over the bulk of its fleet to the State of Slovenes, Croats and Serbs without a shot being fired. This was considered preferential to handing the fleet to the Allies, as the new state had declared its neutrality. Furthermore, the newly formed state had also not yet publicly dethroned Emperor Karl I, keeping the possibility of reforming the Empire into a triple monarchy alive. The transfer to the State of Slovenes, Croats and Serbs began on the morning of 31 October, with Horthy meeting representatives from the South Slav nationalities aboard his flagship, Viribus Unitis. After "short and cool" negotiations, the arrangements were settled and the handover was completed that afternoon. The Austro-Hungarian Naval Ensign was struck from Viribus Unitis, and was followed by the remaining ships in the harbor. The head of the newly-established navy for the State of Slovenes, Croats and Serbs, fell to Captain Janko Vuković, who was raised to the rank of admiral and took over Horthy's old responsibilities as Commander-in-Chief of the Fleet. He selected Prinz Eugen's sister ship Viribus Unitis as his flagship.

On 1 November 1918, Viribus Unitis was destroyed when two men of the Regia Marina, Raffaele Paolucci and Raffaele Rossetti, rode a primitive manned torpedo (nicknamed Mignatta or "leech") into the naval base at Pola and attacked her using limpet mines. When the mines exploded at 6:44 am, the battleship sank in 15 minutes; Vuković and 300–400 of the crew went down with her. Prinz Eugen was unharmed in the attack.

=== Post-war ===
Prinz Eugen in Toulon in 1920 as a target ship. Note the guns removed from her turrets

The Armistice of Villa Giusti, signed between Italy and Austria-Hungary on 3 November 1918, refused to recognize the transfer of Austria-Hungary's warships to the State of Slovenes, Croats and Serbs. As a result, on 4 November 1918, Italian ships sailed into the ports of Trieste, Pola, and Fiume. On 5 November, Italian troops occupied the naval installations at Pola. While the State of Slovenes, Croats and Serbs attempted to hold onto their ships, they lacked the men and officers to do so as most sailors who were not South Slavs had already gone home. The National Council did not order any men to resist the Italians, but they also condemned Italy's actions as illegitimate. On 9 November, all remaining ships in Pola harbor had the Italian flag raised. At a conference at Corfu, the Allied Powers agreed the transfer of Austria-Hungary's Navy to the State of Slovenes, Croats and Serbs could not be accepted, despite sympathy from the United Kingdom.

Faced with the prospect of being given an ultimatum to surrender the former Austro-Hungarian warships, the National Council agreed to hand over the ships beginning on 10 November 1918. It would not be until 1920 when the final distribution of the ships was settled among the Allied powers under the terms of the Treaty of Saint-Germain-en-Laye. Of the two remaining Tegetthoffs, Prinz Eugen was formally ceded to France. The French Navy removed the main armament of Prinz Eugen for inspection then used the dreadnought as a target ship. She was first subject to test aerial bombardment attacks and later sunk by the French battleships Paris, Jean Bart, and France off of Toulon on 28 June 1922, exactly eight years after the assassination of Archduke Franz Ferdinand.

=== Legacy ===
Following Nazi Germany's incorporation of Austria via the Anschluss of March 1938, Adolf Hitler used Austria-Hungary's naval history to appeal to the Austrian public and obtain their support. Hitler lived in Vienna during the development of much of the Austro-Hungarian Navy, and thus decided upon an "Austrian" sounding name for a German cruiser which was under construction at Kiel in 1938. The cruiser was originally to be named Tegetthoff by the Kriegsmarine, after Wilhelm von Tegetthoff. However, concerns over the possible insult to Italy and Benito Mussolini of naming the cruiser after the Austrian victor of the Battle of Lissa, led Hitler to adopt Prinz Eugen as the ship's namesake. Prinz Eugen was launched on 22 August 1938, in a ceremony attended by Hitler and the Governor (German: Reichsstatthalter) of Ostmark, Arthur Seyss-Inquart, who made the christening speech. Also present at the launch was Regent of Hungary, Admiral Miklós Horthy, who had previously commanded Prinz Eugen from 24 November 1917 to 1 March 1918 prior to being named Austria-Hungary's Commander-in-Chief of the Fleet in the final months of World War I. Horthy's wife, Magdolna Purgly, performed the christening. After the defeat of Nazi Germany in May 1945, the German cruiser was surrendered to the British Royal Navy before being transferred to the US Navy as a war prize. After examining the ship in the United States, the US Navy assigned the cruiser to the Operation Crossroads nuclear tests at Bikini Atoll. Having survived the atomic blasts, the cruiser was towed to Kwajalein Atoll, where she ultimately capsized and sank in December 1946.

Prinz Eugen's former captain Miklós Horthy returned to Hungary after the war. In 1919, following a series of revolutions and external interventions in Hungary from Romania, Czechoslovakia, and Yugoslavia, Horthy returned to Budapest with the National Army and was subsequently invited to become Regent of the Kingdom by parliament. Horthy continued to rule Hungary throughout World War II. Horthy's government eventually fell after Germany invaded and took control of the country in March 1944 in Operation Margarethe. In October 1944, Horthy announced that Hungary had declared the armistice to the Allies and withdrawn from the Axis powers. He was forced to resign, placed under arrest by the Germans and taken to Bavaria. He ultimately survived the war and later appeared as a witness at the Nuremberg war-crimes trials in 1948. After the war, Horthy settled and lived out his remaining years in exile in Portugal, dying in 1957.

== Bibliography ==
- Conrad-Hötzendorf, Franz (1921–1925). Aus meiner Dienstzeit, 1906–1918 (in German). Vienna: Rikola Verlag.
- Earle, Ralph (March 1913). "Professional Notes". United States Naval Institute Proceedings. 39 (1).
- Fischer, Fritz (1967). Germany's Aims in the First World War. New York: W.W. Norton. ISBN 978-0-393-09798-6.
- Fromkin, David (2004). Europe's Last Summer: Why the World Went to War in 1914. William Heinemann Ltd. ISBN 978-0-434-00858-2.
- Gardiner, Robert; Chesneau, Roger, eds. (1980). Conway's All the World's Fighting Ships 1922–1946. Annapolis: Naval Institute Press. ISBN 978-0-87021-913-9. OCLC 18121784.
- Gebhard, Louis (1968). "Austria-Hungary's Dreadnought Squadron: the Naval Outlay of 1911". Austrian History Yearbook. 4: 245–258. doi:10.1017/S0067237800013230. S2CID 145130091.
- Gill, C.C. (January–February 1914). "Professional Notes". United States Naval Institute Proceedings. 40 (1).
- Greger, René (1976). Austro-Hungarian Warships of World War I. Ann Arbor, MI: University of Michigan Press. ISBN 0-7110-0623-7.
- Gröner, Erich (1990). German Warships: 1815–1945. Annapolis: Naval Institute Press. ISBN 978-0-87021-790-6.
- Halpern, Paul G. (1995). A Naval History of World War I. Annapolis, MD: Naval Institute Press. ISBN 978-1-55750-352-7.
- Halpern, Paul G. (1987). The Naval War in the Mediterranean, 1914-1918. Annapolis, MD: Naval Institute Press. ISBN 0870214489.
- Halpern, Paul G. (1971). The Mediterranean Naval Situation, 1908-1914. Cambridge, MA: Harvard University Press. ISBN 0674564626.
- Henderson, Nicholas (1966). Prince Eugen of Savoy. Weidenfeld & Nicolson. ISBN 978-1-84212-597-7. OCLC 50018284.
- Hore, Peter (2006). Battleships. London: Lorena Books. ISBN 978-0-7548-1407-8. OCLC 56458155.
- Koburger, Charles W. (2001). The Central Powers in the Adriatic, 1914–1918: War in a Narrow Sea. Westport, CT: Praeger. ISBN 978-0-275-97071-0.
- Koop, Gerhard; Schmolke, Klaus-Peter (1992). Die Schweren Kreuzer der Admiral Hipper-Klasse [The Heavy Cruisers of the Admiral Hipper Class] (in German). Bonn: Bernard & Graefe Verlag. ISBN 978-3-7637-5896-8.
- "Naval Notes". Royal United Services Institution. Journal. 59 (437): 273–286. 1914. doi:10.1080/03071841409421863.
- McKay, Derek (1977). Prince Eugene of Savoy. London: Thames and Hudson. ISBN 978-0-85177-252-3.
- Noppen, Ryan (2012). Austro-Hungarian Battleships 1914-18. Oxford, UK: Osprey Publishing. ISBN 978-1-84908-688-2.
- Preston, Antony (2002). World's Worst Warships. London: Conway's Maritime Press. ISBN 978-0-85177-754-2.
- Schmalenbach, Paul (1979). German Raiders. Annapolis, MD: Naval Institute Press. ISBN 0-85059-351-4.
- Sieche, Erwin (1985). "Austria-Hungary". In Gardiner, Robert; Gray, Randal (eds.). Conway's All the World's Fighting Ships 1906–1921. Annapolis: Naval Institute Press. ISBN 978-0-87021-907-8. OCLC 12119866.
- Sieche, Erwin F. (1991). "S.M.S. Szent István: Hungaria's Only and Ill-Fated Dreadnought". Warship International. XXVII (2). Toledo, OH: International Warship Research Organization: 112–146. ISSN 0043-0374.
- Sieche, Erwin F. (1985). "Zeittafel der Vorgange rund um die Auflosung und Ubergabe der k.u.k. Kriegsmarine 1918–1923". Marine—Gestern, Heute (in German). 12 (1). Journal of the Austrian Marine History Working Group: 129–141.
- Sokol, Anthony (1968). The Imperial and Royal Austro-Hungarian Navy. Annapolis: United States Naval Institute. OCLC 462208412.
- Sondhaus, Lawrence (1994). The Naval Policy of Austria-Hungary, 1867-1918: Navalism, Industrial Development, and the Politics of Dualism. West Lafayette, IN: Purdue University Press. ISBN 1-55753-034-3.
- Vego, Milan N. (1996). Austro-Hungarian Naval Policy: 1904-14. London, UK: Routledge. ISBN 978-0714642093.
- Willmott, H.P. (2009). The Last Century of Sea Power. Bloomington, IN: Indiana University Press. ISBN 978-0253352149.
