= Rudolf Montecuccoli =

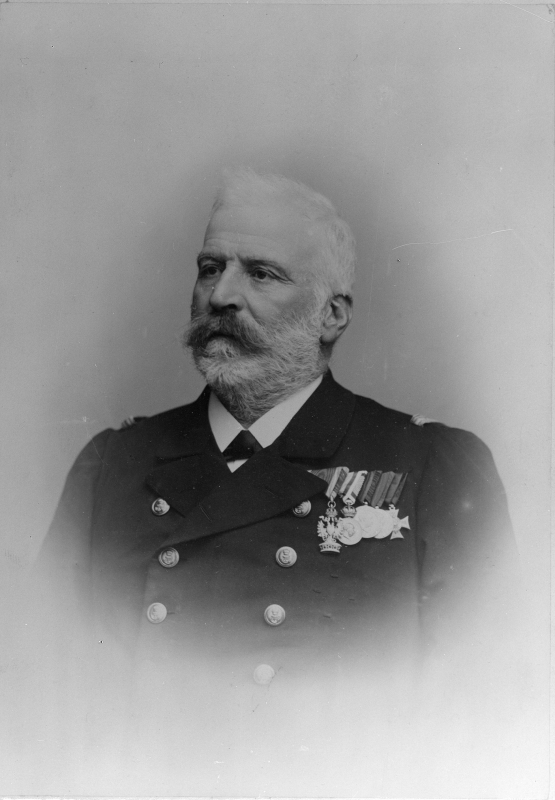
- Montecuccoli in 1901
- Born: 22 February 1843; Modena, Duchy of Modena and Reggio
- Died: 16 May 1922 (aged 79); Baden-bei-Wien, Austria
- Title: Chief of Austro-Hungarian Navy
- Term: 1904–1913
- Predecessor: Hermann von Spaun
- Successor: Anton Haus

Rudolf Graf Montecuccoli degli Erri (22 February 1843 – 16 May 1922) was chief of the Austro-Hungarian Navy from 1904 to 1913 and largely responsible for the modernization of the fleet before the First World War.

== Early life ==
Montecuccoli was born in Modena in 1843, a descendant of the famous imperial Feldmarschall, Raimondo Montecuccoli (1609–1680). Raimondo Montecuccoli's only son died in 1698, but the title of count descended through his daughters to two lines, Austrian and Modenese.

When Rudolf Montecuccoli was born, Modena was still an Austrian Habsburg possession, ruled by the house of Austria-Este. During the 1859 Italian campaign, however, the last Habsburg Duke of Modena, Francesco V, fled to Austria following the Austrian defeat at Magenta (4 June). Italian patriots seized control, demanding union with the Kingdom of Sardinia. This was confirmed by plebiscite in March 1860, and at the age of 17 Montecuccoli saw his birthplace and ancestral home pass under what he considered a foreign sovereignty. (A year later, Modena became part of the Kingdom of Italy.)

Montecuccoli graduated from the Imperial and Royal Naval Academy at Fiume in 1859 as a provisional naval cadet, well on his way to a career in the Imperial and Royal Navy.

== Career ==
In 1866, Montecuccoli saw action at the Battle of Lissa aboard the screw frigate SMS Adria and was promoted to ensign of the line.

In 1885, he was promoted to lieutenant commander.

Montecuccoli was little known outside the Austro-Hungarian naval establishment before his appointment as Marinekommandant (Navy Commander) and Chef der Marinesektion (Chief of the Naval Section) of the War Ministry in October 1904, upon the resignation of Hermann von Spaun.

Montecuccoli found his efforts to modernize the fleet impeded by chronic domestic political friction in the annual budget debate of the Reichsrat, which was composed of 60-member delegations from the Austrian and Hungarian parliaments. Faced with Italian plans to build a dreadnought battleship, Montecuccoli on 20 February 1908 announced Austria-Hungary's intention to build such vessels. The design was accepted on 27 April 1909; Montecuccoli thought the necessary funds could be obtained in the 1910 budget, to be debated in October 1909. He suggested that Stabilimento Tecnico Triestino (STT) and Škoda should begin construction of the ships and guns on their own account until the naval budget was adopted.

When the time came, the Reichsrat denied the funds for domestic political reasons. Montecuccoli was compelled to resort to an intricate web of propaganda and deception to camouflage the fact that the new ships did not have Reichsrat approval. He asserted that industry was financing the construction of two dreadnoughts on speculation; this was completely untrue, and both STT and Skoda were extremely nervous about the subterfuge. In the event, Viribus Unitis and Tegetthoff could not be laid down until after Montecuccoli took an expensive 32 million crown credit in 1910 upon his own responsibility. By that time Italy had launched Dante Alighieri and laid down three more dreadnoughts, and France had laid down Courbet, her first.

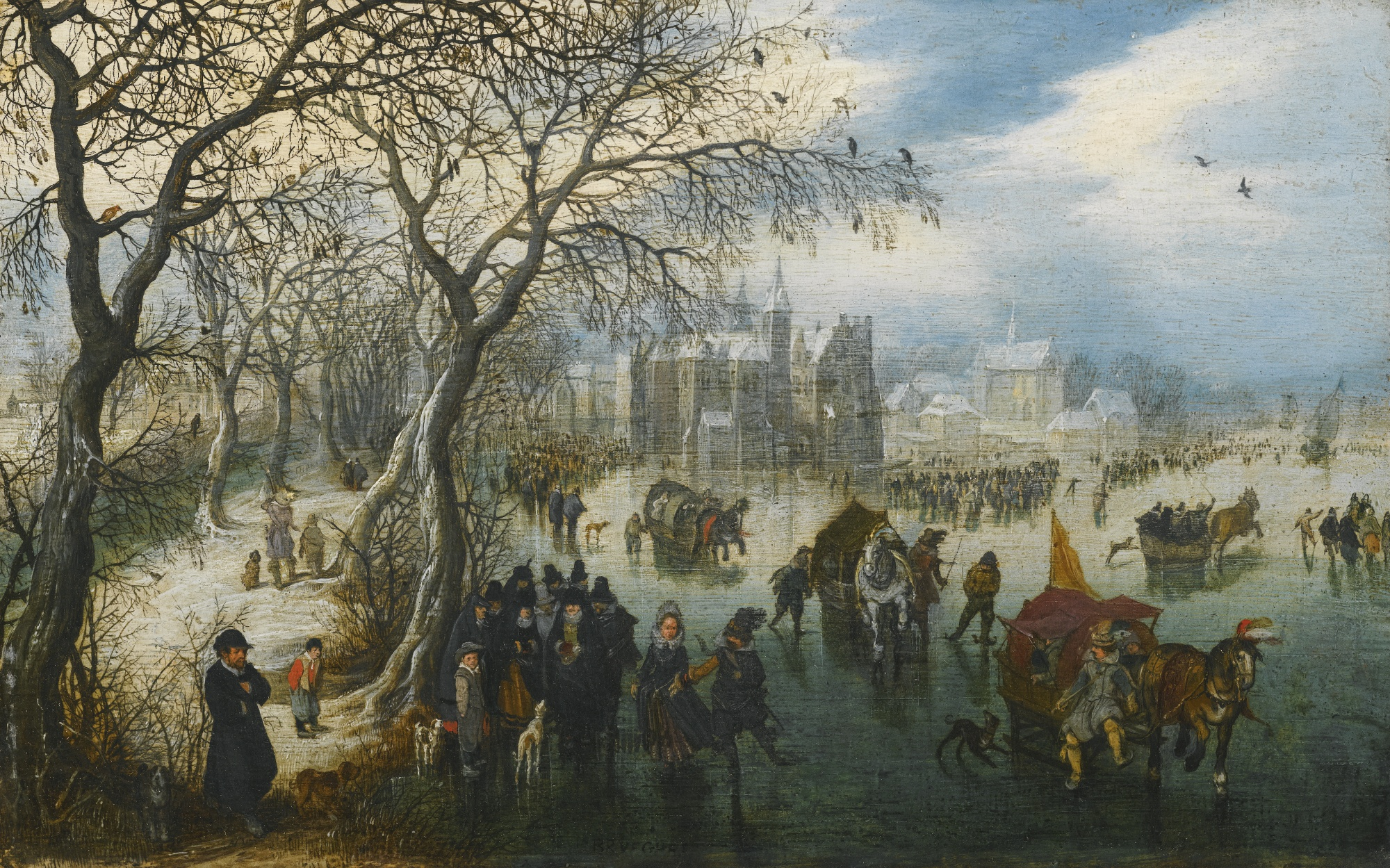
Montecuccoli was an art collector. This winter landscape, formerly in his collection, appeared at Sotheby's, London in 2014.

The first Austro-Hungarian dreadnoughts were thus already under construction when the Reichsrat delegations met in March 1911 to consider the 1911 budget. Viribus Unitis and Tegetthoff were authorized retroactively by the deputies, who also sanctioned construction of Prinz Eugen and Szent István. Approval of these two later ships was calculated to keep the balance between the Austrian and Hungarian parts of the Dual Monarchy. Only one went to the Austrian-owned STT at Trieste, the other going to the Danubius Yard at the Hungarian port of Fiume, and the two ships' names carefully chosen to reflect, respectively, Austrian and Hungarian national pride.

Montecuccoli retired as head of the naval administration on his 70th birthday, 22 February 1913, and was succeeded by Anton Haus. The Austro-Hungarian fleet, so arduously modernized by Montecuccoli and maintained in wartime by Haus as a 'fleet in being', was parceled out among the victorious powers after 1918.

Montecuccoli died in Baden-bei-Wien in 1922, at the age of 79.

== Honours ==
He received the following orders and decorations:

- (Austrian Empire) (Kingdom of Hungary) Austria-Hungary:
  - Knight of the Iron Crown, 2nd Class with War Decoration, 1901
  - Military Merit Cross, in Diamonds
  - Grand Cross of the Imperial Order of Leopold, 1908
  - Knight of the Golden Fleece, 1911
  - Grand Cross of the Royal Hungarian Order of St. Stephen, 1913
- Kingdom of Italy: Commander of Saints Maurice and Lazarus
- Empire of Japan:
  - Grand Cordon of the Rising Sun
  - Grand Cordon of the Order of Meiji
- Principality of Montenegro: Grand Cross of the Order of Prince Danilo I
- Kingdom of Prussia:
  - Grand Cross of the Red Eagle
  - Knight of the Prussian Crown, 1st Class with Swords and Diamonds
- Kingdom of Romania: Commander of the Crown of Romania
- Russian Empire:
  - Knight of St. Anna, 1st Class with Swords
  - Knight of St. Stanislaus, 1st Class
- Spain:
  - Grand Cross of the Order of Charles III, 19 October 1906
  - Knight of the Naval Merit Order, 2nd Class
- United Kingdom: Honorary Grand Cross of the Royal Victorian Order, 23 March 1904

== Literature ==
- Conway's All the World's Fighting Ships 1906–1921.
- Jane's Fighting Ships 1914.

== See also ==
- Austro-Hungarian Navy

Military offices
Preceded by Hermann von Spaun	Commander-in-Chief of the Austro-Hungarian Naval Fleet; 1904–1913	Succeeded by Anton Haus
