= Hermann von Spaun =

Austro-Hungarian Navy admiral (1833-1919)

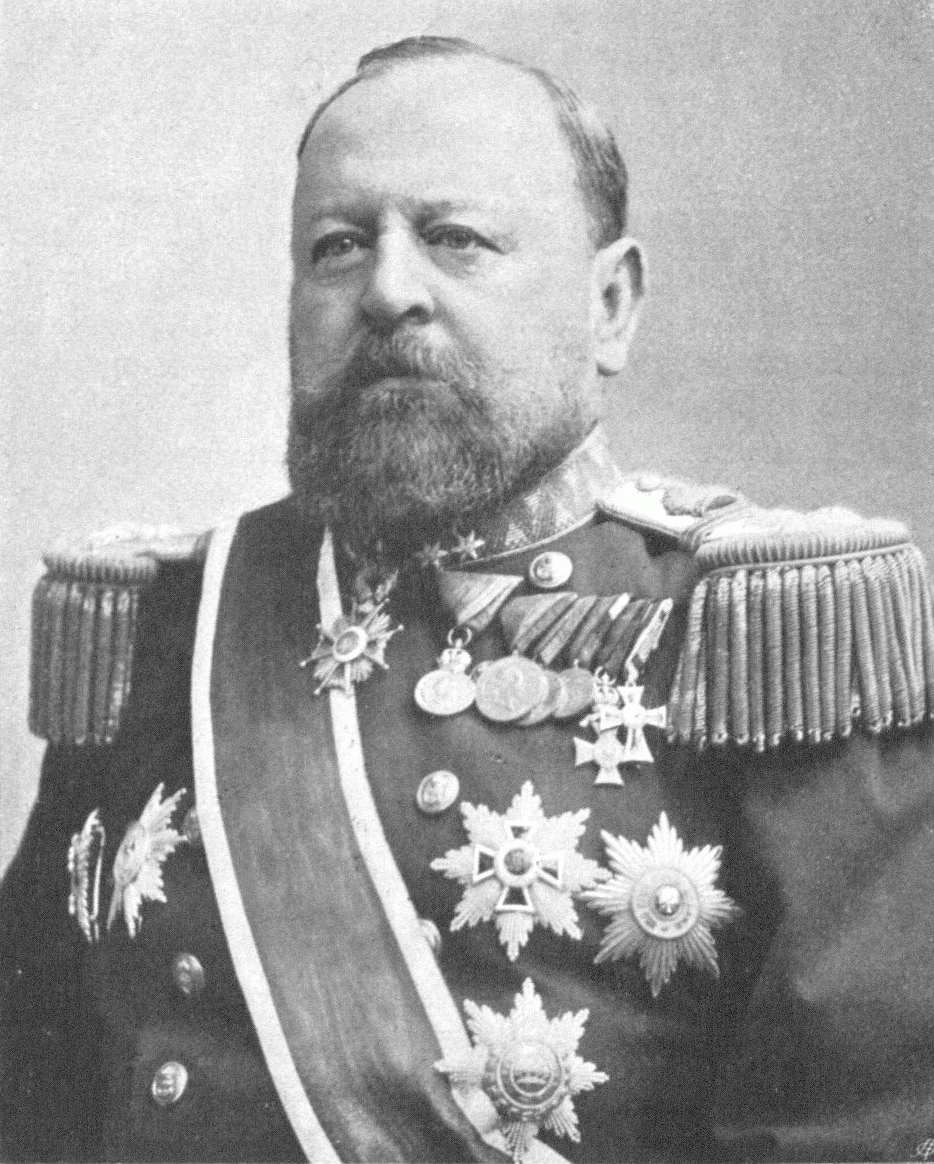
- Portrait by Ludwig Grillich
- Born: 9 May 1833; Vienna, Austrian Empire (today Austria)
- Died: 28 May 1919 (aged 86); Gorizia (today Italy)
- Military career
- Allegiance: Austria-Hungary
- Branch: Imperial and Royal War Navy
- Rank: Admiral
- Commands: Chef der Marinesektion (Commander of Navy) (December 1897-October 1904)

Hermann Freiherr von Spaun (9 May 1833 – 28 May 1919) was an admiral in the Austro-Hungarian Navy. He was the Commander-in-Chief of the Austro-Hungarian Navy from December 1897 to October 1904.

== Background ==
Born into the Swabian noble family of Spaun, Hermann was the son of Joseph von Spaun (1788-1865), a close friend to Franz Schubert and an advisor in the imperial court who was elevated to baronial rank in 1859, and Franziska Roner Edle von Ehrenwert (1795-1890). He married Emma Lobmeyr on 28 April 1893 in Trieste.

== Honours ==
The cruiser SMS Admiral Spaun was named in his honour.

=== Orders and decorations ===
- Austrian Empire:
  - Knight of the Iron Crown, 3rd Class with War Decoration, 1866; 1st Class, 1898
  - Knight of the Imperial Order of Leopold, 1889; Grand Cross, 1900
- Kingdom of Greece: Commander of the Redeemer
- Kingdom of Italy: Grand Officer of Saints Maurice and Lazarus
- Empire of Japan: Grand Cordon of the Rising Sun
- Mexican Empire: Officer of the Order of Guadalupe
- Principality of Montenegro: Grand Officer of the Order of Prince Danilo I
- Ottoman Empire: Order of the Medjidie, 3rd Class
- Persian Empire: Order of the Lion and the Sun, 1st Class
- Kingdom of Portugal: Commander of the Military Order of Christ, with Star
- Kingdom of Prussia: Knight of the Red Eagle, 1st Class
- Russian Empire: Knight of the White Eagle
- Spain: Commander of the Order of Isabella the Catholic
- United Kingdom: Honorary Grand Cross of St Michael and St George, 30 June 1905 – in recognition of his services on the International Commission of Inquiry into the North Sea Incident

== Literature ==
- A. Schmidt-Brentano: "Spaun Hermann Frh. von". In: Österreichisches Biographisches Lexikon 1815–1950 (ÖBL). Vol. 13, Austrian Academy of Sciences, Vienna 2010, ISBN 978-3-7001-6963-5, p. 6 f. (Direct links to "p. 6", "p. 7")

Military offices
Preceded by Maximilian Daublebsky von Sterneck	Commander-in-Chief of the Austro-Hungarian Naval Fleet; 1897–1904	Succeeded by Rudolf Montecuccoli
