= SMS Erzherzog Friedrich =

Austro-Hungarian Navy's Erzherzog Karl-class battleship

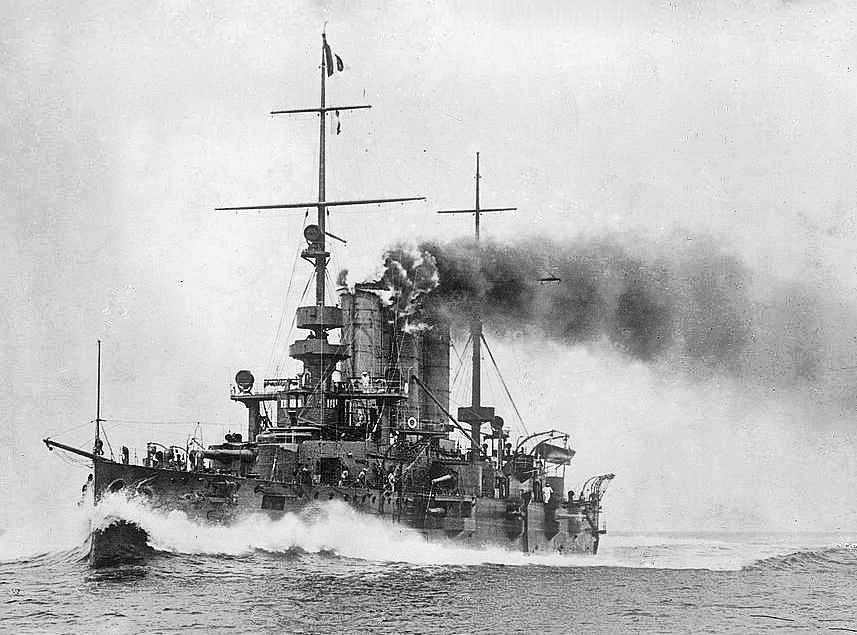
- Sister ship SMS Erzherzog Ferdinand Max underway

History

Austria-Hungary
- Name: Erzherzog Friedrich
- Namesake: Archduke Friedrich of Austria
- Builder: STT
- Laid down: 4 October 1902
- Launched: 30 April 1904
- Completed: 31 January 1907
- Fate: Scrapped, 1921

General characteristics
- Class & type: Erzherzog Karl-class pre-dreadnought battleship
- Displacement: 10,472 long tons (10,640 t)
- Length: 414 ft 2 in (126.2 m)
- Beam: 71 ft 5 in (21.8 m)
- Draft: 24 ft 7 in (7.5 m)
- Installed power: 18,000 ihp (13,423 kW)
- Propulsion: 2 shafts; 4-cylinder vertical triple expansion steam engines
- Speed: 20.5 knots (38.0 km/h; 23.6 mph)
- Complement: 700
- Armament: 4 × 24 cm (9.4 in)/40 Škoda guns; 12 × 19 cm (7.5 in)/42 Škoda guns; 12 × 7 cm (2.8 in)/45 Škoda guns; 2 × 7 cm (2.8 in)/45 Škoda AA guns; 4 × 47 mm (1.9 in)/44 cal Škoda QF guns; 2 × 4.7-cm/33 cal Škoda QF guns; 4 × 37 mm (1.5 in) Vickers guns; 2 × 45 cm (17.7 in) torpedo tubes
- Armor: Waterline belt: 210 mm (8.3 in); Deck: 55 mm (2.2 in); Turrets: 240 mm (9.4 in); Casemates: 150 mm (5.9 in); Conning tower: 220 mm (8.7 in); Bulkheads: 200 mm (7.9 in)

SMS Erzherzog Friedrich (Note: "SMS" stands for "Seiner Majestät Schiff ", or "His Majesty's Ship" in German.) (German: "His Majesty's ship Archduke Friedrich") was a pre-dreadnought battleship built by the Austro-Hungarian Navy in 1902. The second ship of the Erzherzog Karl class, she was launched on 30 April 1904. She was assigned to the III Battleship Division.

For most of World War I, Erzherzog Friedrich remained in her home port of Pula, in present-day Croatia, except for four engagements. In 1914, she formed part of the Austro-Hungarian flotilla sent to protect the escape of the German ships SMS Goeben and SMS Breslau from the British-held Mediterranean; she advanced as far as Brindisi before being recalled to her home port. Her sole combat engagement occurred in late May 1915, when she participated in the bombardment of the Italian port city of Ancona. She also took part in suppressing a major mutiny among the crew members of several armored cruisers stationed in Cattaro between 1–3 February 1918. She also attempted to break through the Otranto Barrage in June of that year, but had to retreat when the dreadnought SMS Szent István was sunk. After the war, Erzherzog Friedrich was awarded to the French as a war prize in 1920.

== Design ==
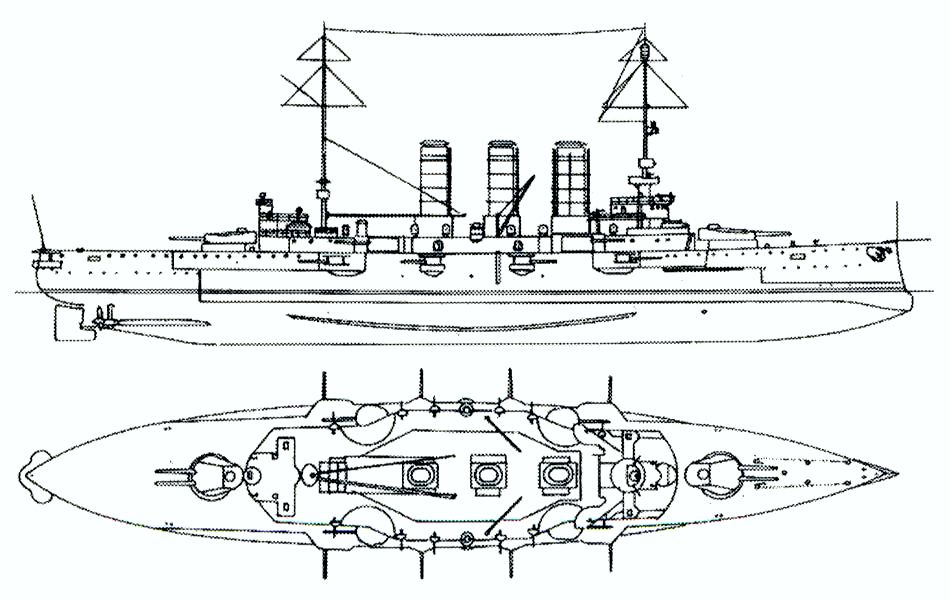
Right elevation and plan of the Erzherzog Karl class

Erzherzog Friedrich displaced 10,472 long tons (10,640 t). She was 414 feet 2 inches (126.2 m) long, had a beam of 71 feet 5 inches (21.8 m) and a draft of 24 feet 7 inches (7.5 m). She was manned by 700 men. She and her sisters were the last and largest pre-dreadnought class built by the Austro-Hungarian Navy, surpassing the Habsburg class by approximately 2,000 tonnes (1,968 long tons). She was propelled by two two-shaft, four cylinder vertical triple expansion steam engines. On trials, they developed 18,000 ihp (13,423 kW), which propelled the ship at a speed of 20.5 knots (38.0 km/h; 23.6 mph).

Erzherzog Friedrich carried a primary armament of four 24-centimeter (9.4 in)/40 caliber guns in two twin turrets on the centerline. These guns were an Austro-Hungarian replica of the British 24 cm/40 (9.4") Krupp C/94, which was used on the Habsburgs. Her secondary armament consisted of twelve 19 cm (7.5 in)/42 caliber guns, also made by Škoda, mounted in eight single casemates on either wing of the ship and two twin turrets on the centerline. shell 20,000 metres (22,000 yd) at maximum elevation with a muzzle velocity of 800 metres per second (2,600 ft/s). The gun weighed 12.1 tons and could fire three rounds per minute. The ships had a tertiary armament for protection against torpedo boats in the form of the 7 cm (2.8 in)/45 caliber gun, also manufactured by Škoda. Anti-aircraft and airship protection was covered by the four 37-millimeter (1.5 in) Vickers anti-aircraft guns on the ship bought from Britain in 1910 and mounted onto Erzherzog Karl. After 1916–17 refits four Škoda 7 cm L/45 BAG anti-aircraft guns were installed. Erzherzog Karl was also fitted with two above water 45-centimeter (17.7 in) torpedo tubes, although rarely used.

== Service history ==
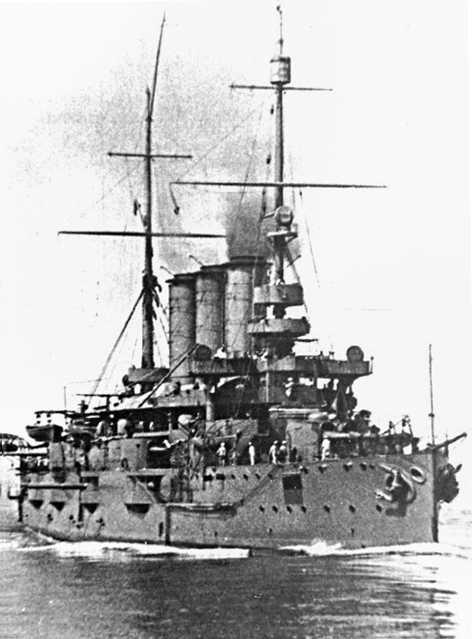
SMS Erzherzog Friedrich underway.

At the outbreak of World War I, Erzherzog Friedrich was in the III division of the Austrian-Hungarian battle-fleet. She was mobilized on the eve of the war along with the remainder of the fleet to support the flight of SMS Goeben and SMS Breslau. The two German ships were attempting to break out of Messina, which was surrounded by British troops, and make their way to Turkey. The breakout succeeded. When the flotilla had advanced as far south as Brindisi in south eastern Italy, the Austro-Hungarian ships were recalled. In company with other units of the Austro-Hungarian navy, Erzherzog Friedrich took part in the bombardment of Ancona on 24 May 1915. There she and her sisters expended 24 rounds of 240 mm armor-piercing shells at signal and semaphore stations as well as 74 rounds of 190 mm shells aimed at Italian gun-batteries and other port installations.

A major mutiny among crews of the armored cruisers stationed in Cattaro, including Sankt Georg and Kaiser Karl VI, began on 1 February 1918. Two days later, Erzherzog Friedrich and her two sister ships arrived in the port and assisted with the suppression of the mutiny. Following the restoration of order in the naval base, the armored cruisers Sankt Georg and Kaiser Karl VI were decommissioned and Erzherzog Friedrich and her sisters were stationed in Cattaro in their place. For the morning of 11 June, Admiral Miklós Horthy planned a major assault on the Otranto Barrage; the three Erzherzog Karls and the four Tegetthoff-class battleships were to provide support for the Novara-class cruisers. The plan was intended to replicate the success of the raid conducted one year earlier. Horthy's plan was to destroy the blockading fleet by luring Allied ships to the cruisers and lighter ships, which were protected from the heavier guns of the battleships, including the guns of the Erzherzog Karl class. However, on the morning of 10 June, the dreadnought Szent István was torpedoed and sunk by an Italian torpedo boat. Horthy felt that the element of surprise had been compromised, and therefore called off the operation. This was to be the last military action Erzherzog Friedrich took part in and she spent the rest of their career at port in Pula. Following the end of World War I in November 1918 and the surrender of Austria-Hungary, Erzherzog Friedrich was ceded as a war reparation to France in 1920. She was later scrapped in 1921.
