= U30 =

U30 may refer to:

== Naval vessels ==
- German submarine U-30, various vessels
- HMS Mermaid (U30), a sloop of the Royal Navy
- SM U-30 (Austria-Hungary), a submarine of the Austro-Hungarian Navy

== Other uses ==
- Nissan Presage (U30), a Japanese minivan
- Small ditrigonal icosidodecahedron
- Small nucleolar RNA SNORD30
- Temple Bar Airport, in Mohave County, Arizona, United States
- U-30 tow tractor, an aircraft ground handling vehicle
