= Erzherzog Karl-class battleship =

Austro-Hungarian battleship class

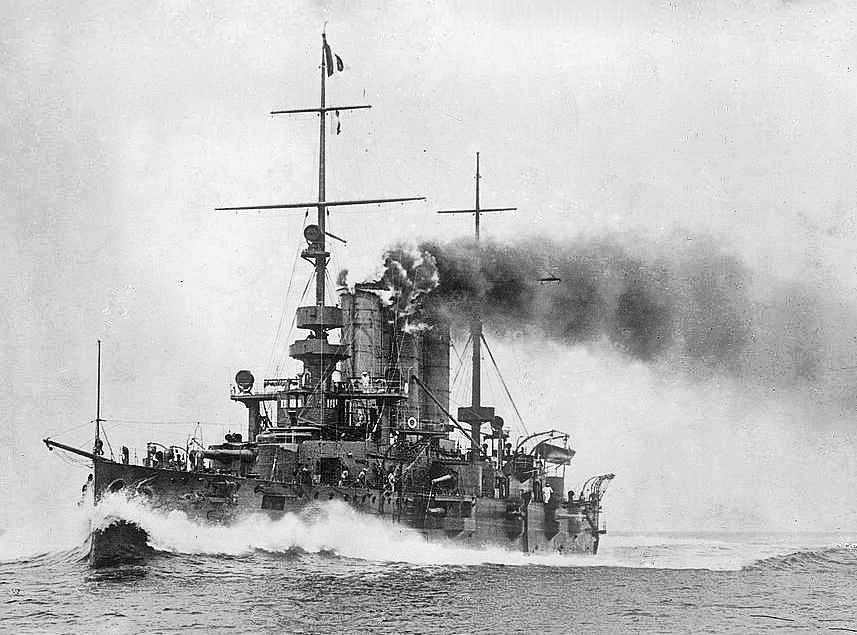
- SMS Erzherzog Ferdinand Max

Class overview
- Builders: Stabilimento Tecnico Triestino
- Operators: Austro-Hungarian Navy
- Preceded by: Habsburg class
- Succeeded by: Radetzky class
- Built: 1902–07
- In commission: 1906–1918
- Completed: 3
- Scrapped: 3

General characteristics
- Type: Pre-dreadnought battleship
- Displacement: 10,472 long tons (10,640 t)
- Length: 414 ft 2 in (126.2 m)
- Beam: 71 ft 5 in (21.8 m)
- Draft: 24 ft 7 in (7.5 m)
- Installed power: 13,530 ihp (10,089 kW)
- Propulsion: 2 shafts; 4-cylinder vertical triple expansion steam engines
- Speed: 20.5 knots (38.0 km/h; 23.6 mph)
- Complement: 700
- Armament: 4 × 24 cm (9.4 in)/40 Škoda guns; 12 × 19 cm (7.5 in)/42 Škoda guns; 12 × 7 cm (2.8 in)/45 SFK Škoda guns; 2 × 7 cm (2.8 in)/45 Škoda AA guns; 4 × 47 mm (1.9 in)/44 cal Škoda QF guns; 2 × 4.7-cm/33 cal Škoda QF guns; 4 × 37 mm (1.5 in) Vickers guns; 2 × 45 cm (17.7 in) torpedo tubes
- Armor: Waterline belt: 210 mm (8.3 in); Deck: 55 mm (2.2 in); Turrets: 240 mm (9.4 in); Casemates: 150 mm (5.9 in); Conning tower: 220 mm (8.7 in); Bulkheads: 200 mm (7.9 in)

The Erzherzog Karl class was a class of pre-dreadnought battleships of the Austro-Hungarian Navy built before World War I. All of the battleships of the Erzherzog Karl-class were built in the Stabilimento Tecnico Triestino shipyards in Trieste. The first battleship, Erzherzog Karl was laid down in 1902. Construction on the remaining two battleships, Erzherzog Ferdinand Max and Erzherzog Friedrich continued up to 1905. Erzherzog Karl was commissioned in 1906, while Erzherzog Ferdinand Max and Erzherzog Friedrich were commissioned in 1907. The three Erzherzog Karl-class battleships were considered relatively modern by the time they were commissioned. However, small docking space and budget restraints resulted in the class being fairly compact. Nevertheless, they were well designed and properly protected. They were named after senior members of the Austrian Imperial family.

Despite these qualities, the Erzherzog Karl-class battleships were inferior to the Dreadnought type battleships (launched 1906) – with their "all big gun" armament and turbine propulsion. As a result, they only played a limited role during World War I. At the beginning of the war, the members of the Erzherzog Karl class formed the III division of the Austrian-Hungarian battle-fleet and were active in May 1915 in the combined fleet operation of bombardment of Italian ports and other vital communications. The battleships of the Erzherzog Karl class also participated in the flight of SMS Goeben and SMS Breslau during the opening days of the war.

The ships also took part in suppressing a major mutiny among the crew members of two armoured cruisers stationed in Cattaro between 1–3 February 1918. Following Austria-Hungary's collapse in at the end of World War I, Erzherzog Karl and Erzherzog Friedrich were handed over to France. The remaining battleship, Erzherzog Ferdinand Max, was given to Great Britain. Erzherzog Karl ran aground at Bizerte and was broken up there in 1921. The remaining two battleships were scrapped in 1921 in Italy.

== Design ==
=== General characteristics ===
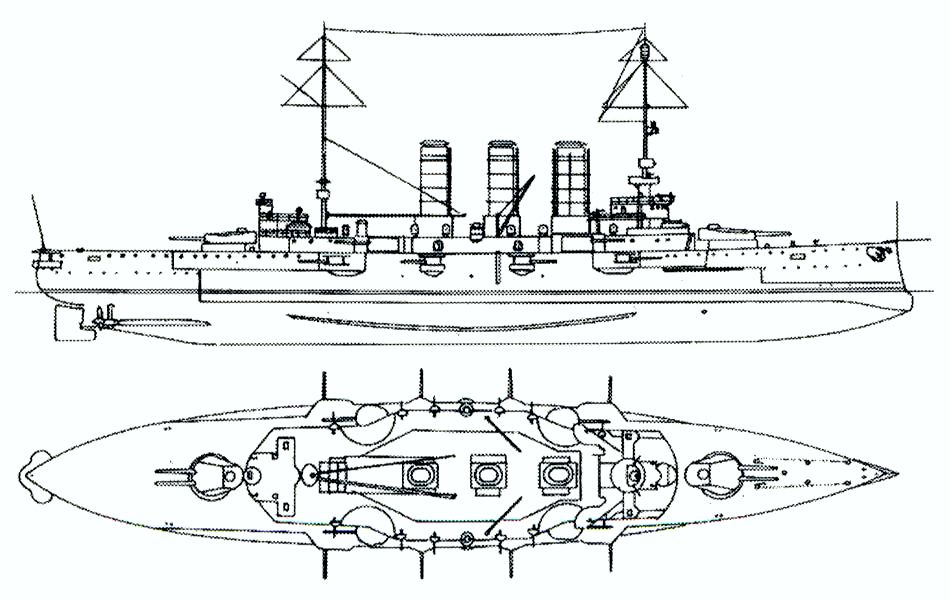
Right elevation and plan of the Erzherzog Karl class

The Erzherzog Karl class displaced 10,472 long tons (10,640 t). They had an overall length of 414 feet 2 inches (126.2 m), had a beam of 71 feet 5 inches (21.8 m) and a draft of 24 feet 7 inches (7.5 m). They were manned by 700 men.

=== Propulsion ===
The ships were equipped with two four-cylinder triple-expansion engines each driving a single shaft and produced a total of 13,530 indicated horsepower (10,090 kW), enabling them to reach a maximum speed of 20 knots (23 mph). Steam was supplied by 12 Yarrow water-tube boilers located in three boiler rooms. The ships could carry a maximum of 1,565 tons of coal, which gave them a range of 4,000 nautical miles (4,600 mi) at 10 knots (12 mph).

=== Armament ===
The Erzherzog Karl class carried a primary armament made by Škoda Works. On each ship, there were four 24-centimeter (9.4 in)/40 caliber guns in two twin turrets on the centerline. These guns were an Austro-Hungarian replica of the 24 cm/40 (9.4") Krupp C/94, which was used on the Habsburgs. The guns could be depressed to −5° and elevated to 30°. The arc of fire of the guns was 300°, or 150° in each direction. Each gun required a crew of twenty men. At maximum elevation, the gun could fire a 140-kilogram (310 lb) shell 16,900 metres (18,500 yd). or ten and a half miles. They could fire three to four armor-piercing shells per minute at a muzzle velocity of 690 metres per second (2,300 ft/s). Each of the guns weighed at least 24,040 kilograms (53,000 lb).

Their secondary armament consisted of twelve 19 cm (7.5 in)/42 caliber guns, also made by Škoda, mounted in eight single casemates on either wing of the ship and two single midships turrets on the either wing of the ship. They could be depressed to −3° and elevated to 20°. They could fire a 97 kilograms (214 lb) armor-piercing shell 20,000 metres (22,000 yd) at maximum elevation with a muzzle velocity of 800 metres per second (2,600 ft/s). The gun weighed 12.1 tons and could fire three rounds per minute.

The ships had a tertiary armament for protection against torpedo boats in the form of the 7 cm (2.8 in)/45 caliber gun, too manufactured by Škoda. They could be depressed to −10° and elevated to 20, and had an arc of fire of 360°, meaning that they could fire at any target within their range of fire. The guns could fire about ten to fifteen rounds per minute. At their maximum elevation, the guns could fire a 4.5 kilograms (9.9 lb) high-explosive charge 9,140 metres (10,000 yd) at a muzzle velocity of 880 metres per second (2,900 ft/s).

Anti-aircraft and airship protection was covered by the four 37-millimeter (1.5 in) Vickers anti-aircraft guns on the ship. They could be depressed to −5° and elevated to 80°. They had an arc of fire of 360°, which meant that they also could engage any target within their range. Manually operated by only one crewman, they could fire a 0.7 kilograms (1.5 lb) shell 1,830 metres (2,000 yd) at maximum elevation with a muzzle velocity of 640 metres per second (2,100 ft/s). Designed in 1910, each of the guns weighed 57 kilograms (126 lb). After 1916-17 refits two Škoda 7 cm L/45 guns on anti-aircraft mounts were installed. The Erzherzog Karl class was also fitted with two above water 45-centimeter (17.7 in) torpedo tubes, although they were rarely used.

=== Armor ===
The Erzherzog Karl class had an armored belt of Krupp cemented steel running between the for and aft turrets. Midships the belt was 210 mm (8.3 in) thick, tapering to 50 mm (2.0 in)at the ends. Below the waterline the belt tapered to 150 mm (5.9 in).The 24 cm gun turrets were protected by 240 mm (9.4 in) while the 19 cm gun turrets had and the casemates had 150 mm (5.9 in) armor. The conning tower of the ships had 220 mm (8.7 in) of armor plating, while the bulkheads inside the battleship that separated different compartments were 200 mm (7.9 in) thick. The ships also featured a 73 m (239.5 ft) long double bottom for protection against mines along the main part of the hull.

== Construction ==
The Erzherzog Karl class was built by the Generalschiffbauingenieur Siegfried Popper with the aim to match the Italian Regina Margherita class. The ships of that class were named after archdukes of the Austro-Hungarian Royal Family, specifically Archduke Charles, Duke of Teschen, Maximilian I of Mexico and Archduke Friedrich, Duke of Teschen. The ships were all laid down at the Stabilimento Tecnico Triestino in Trieste. The first ship of the class, SMS Erzherzog Karl was laid down on 24 July 1902. Following 15 months of construction she was launched on 4 October 1903 and finally commissioned into the Austro-Hungarian Navy on 17 June 1906. The next ship of the class was SMS Erzherzog Friedrich. She was laid down on 4 October 1902 and launched on 30 April 1904. Erzherzog Friedrich was finally commissioned into the Austro-Hungarian Navy on 31 January 1907. The third and final ship of the Erzherzog Karl class was SMS Erzherzog Ferdinand Max. She was laid down on 9 March 1904 and later launched on 21 May 1905. She was commissioned into the navy on 21 December 1907.

== Ships ==
Construction data
Ship	Builder	Laid down	Launched	Completed	Fate
Erzherzog Karl	Stabilimento Tecnico Triestino, Trieste	24 July 1902	4 October 1903	17 June 1906	Sold for scrap, 1921
Erzherzog Friedrich	Stabilimento Tecnico Triestino, Trieste	4 October 1902	30 April 1904	31 January 1907	Sold for scrap, 1921
Erzherzog Ferdinand Max	Stabilimento Tecnico Triestino, Trieste	9 March 1904	21 May 1905	21 December 1907	Sold for scrap, 1921

== Service history ==
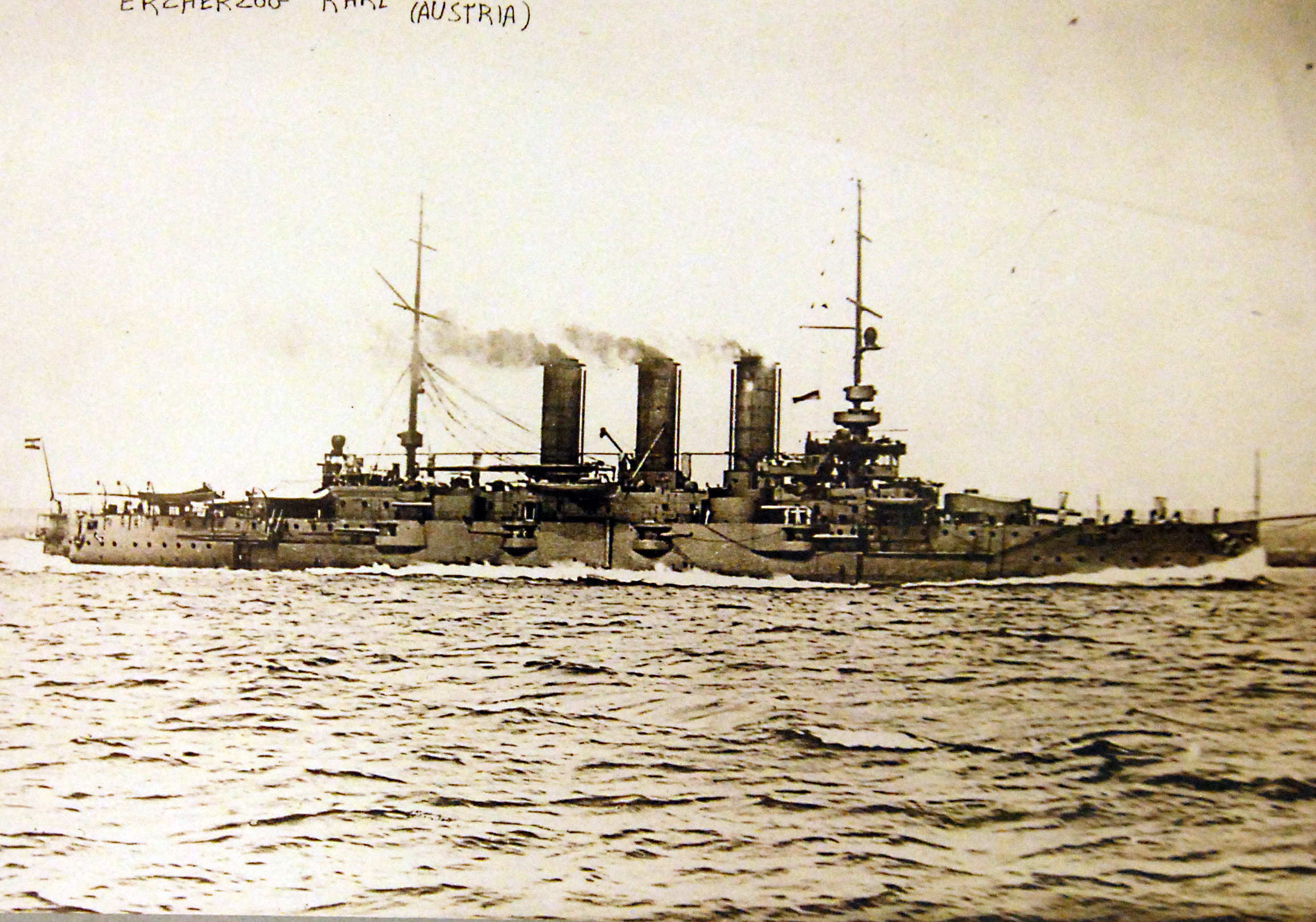
SMS Erzherzog Karl, at sea, July 29, 1914

At the outbreak of World War I the three ships formed the III division of the Austrian-Hungarian battle-fleet and spent most of the war based at Pola. The members of the Erzherzog Karl class were mobilized on the eve of the war to support the flight of SMS Goeben and SMS Breslau. The two German ships were attempting to break out of Messina, being chased by the French Navy and the Royal Navy, and make their way to Turkey. The breakout succeeded. When the flotilla had advanced as far south as Brindisi in south eastern Italy, the Austro-Hungarian ships were recalled. In company with other units of the Austro Hungarian Navy the class took part in the bombardment of Ancona on May 24, 1915. There they expended 24 rounds of 240 mm armor-piercing shells at signal and semaphore stations as well as 74 rounds of 190 mm shells aimed at Italian gun-batteries and other port installations.

A major mutiny among crews of the armored cruisers stationed in Cattaro, including SMS Sankt Georg and SMS Kaiser Karl VI, began on 1 February 1918. Two days later, the three Erzherzog Karl-class ships arrived in the port and assisted with the suppression of the mutiny. Following the restoration of order in the naval base, the armored cruisers Sankt Georg and Kaiser Karl VI were decommissioned and the three Erzherzog Karl-class battleships were stationed in Cattaro in their place.

For the morning of 11 June, Admiral Miklós Horthy planned a major assault on the Otranto Barrage; the three Erzherzog Karls and the four Tegetthoff-class battleships were to provide support for the Novara-class cruisers. The plan was intended to replicate the success of the raid conducted one year earlier. Horthy's plan was to destroy the blockading fleet by luring Allied ships to the cruisers and lighter ships, which were protected from the heavier guns of the battleships, including the Erzherzog Karl class. However, on the morning of 10 June, the dreadnought Szent István was torpedoed and sunk by an Italian torpedo boat. Horthy felt surprise had been lost and therefore called off the operation. This was to be the last military action the Erzherzog Karl-class ships were to take part in and they spent the rest of their career at port in Pola.

Following the end of World War I in November 1918, the members of the Erzherzog Karl class were first taken over by Yugoslavia in 1919, but Erzherzog Karl and Erzherzog Friedrich were then ceded as war reparations to France. The remaining battleship, Erzherzog Ferdinand Max, was ceded to the United Kingdom. However, Erzherzog Karl ran aground at Bizerte on her voyage to Toulon and was eventually broken up in situ. The remaining two battleships were scrapped in 1921.

== Bibliography ==
- Greger, René (1976). Austro-Hungarian warships of World War I. London: Ian Allan. ISBN 978-0-7110-0623-2.
- Halpern, Paul G. (1995). A Naval History of World War I. Annapolis: Naval Institute Press. ISBN 978-1-55750-352-7.
- Hore, Peter (2004). Battleships. London: Lorenz Publishing. ISBN 978-0-7548-1407-8.
- Koburger, Charles (2001). The Central Powers in the Adriatic, 1914–1918: War in a Narrow Sea. Westport, CT: Greenwood Publishing Group. ISBN 978-0-275-97071-0.
- Lienau, Peter. "Germany 24 cm/40 (9.4") SK L/40". NavWeaps.com.
- Lienau, Peter. "Austria-Hungary 19 cm/42 (7.48") Skoda". NavWeaps.com.
- Lienau, Peter. "Austria-Hungary 7 cm/50 (2.75") K10 and K16 Skoda". NavWeaps.com.
- Lienau, Peter. "British .5-pdr 37 mm/43 (1.46") Mark I". NavWeaps.com.
- R.U.S.I. journal. Vol. 50. Royal United Services Institute for Defence Studies. 1901.
- Sieche, Erwin; et al. (Conway´s All the Worlds Fighting Ships 1860-1905) (1979). Roger Chesneau, Eugene M. Kolesnik (ed.). Austria-Hungary. London: Conway Maritime Press.
- Sokol, Anthony (1968). The Imperial and Royal Austro-Hungarian Navy. Annapolis: United States Naval Institute.
- Friedman, Norman (2011). Naval Weapons of World War One: Guns, Torpedoes, Mines and ASW Weapons of All Nations; An Illustrated Directory. Seaforth Publishing. ISBN 978-1848321007.
- Noppen, Ryan (2012). Austro_Hungarian Battleships 1914-18. Oxford: Osprey. ISBN 978-1-84908-688-2.
