= Škoda 19 cm vz. 1904 =

- Type: Naval gun Coastal artillery
- Place of origin: Austria-Hungary

Service history
- In service: 1904–1945
- Used by: Austria-Hungary; Italy
- Wars: World War I World War II

Production history
- Designer: Škoda
- Designed: 1904
- Manufacturer: Škoda
- Produced: 1905
- No. built: ~29

Specifications
- Mass: 12,700 kg (28,000 lb)
- Length: 8 m (26 ft 3 in)
- Barrel length: 7.4 m (24 ft 3 in) L/42
- Shell: Separate loading cased charge and projectile
- Shell weight: 97 kg (214 lb)
- Caliber: 19 cm (7.5 in) 42 caliber
- Elevation: -5 ° to +15°
- Traverse: 300°
- Rate of fire: 4 rpm
- Muzzle velocity: 800 m/s (2,600 ft/s)
- Maximum firing range: 20 km (12 mi) at +13°

The Škoda 19 cm vz. 1904 was a naval gun of the Austro-Hungarian Empire that was used by the Austro-Hungarian Navy during the World War I. The 19 cm vz. 1904 was also used by the Italian Navy and Italian Army as coastal artillery during World War II. The Italians referred to it as the 190/39.

== Construction ==
The Škoda 19 cm vz. 1904 was developed and built by Škoda Works in Plzeň. These guns used Krupp horizontal sliding breech blocks with separate loading metallic cased charges and projectiles. Unlike other large naval guns of the time which used separate loading bagged charges and ammunition, the 19 cm vz. 1904 used separate loading ammunition with charges inside of a brass cartridge case to provide obturation.

== History ==
The Škoda 19 cm vz. 1904 was used as secondary armament on the Erzherzog Karl-class battleships and the armored cruiser SMS Sankt Georg. They were mounted on either pedestal mounts in single casemates amidships or in single turrets. After World War I SMS Sankt Georg and SMS Erzherzog Ferdinand Max were assigned to the United Kingdom as war reparations, while SMS Erzherzog Karl and SMS Erzherzog Friedrich were assigned to France. Between 1920 and 1921 these ships except SMS Erzherzog Karl were delivered to Italy for scrapping. The exact number of guns used for coastal defense during World War II is unknown. Coastal batteries are believed to have been located at Šibenik, Pula, Naples and Tripoli.

Number of guns salvaged:

- 12 guns each from the two Erzherzog Karl-class battleships
- 5 guns from SMS Sankt Georg
  Total = 29 guns

Location and numbers of coastal batteries:

- 2 batteries of 2 guns – Šibenik
- 2 batteries of 2 guns – Pula
- 2 batteries of 2 guns – Naples
- 2 batteries of 4 guns – Tripoli
- 2 guns on pontoon GM269
  Total = 20 guns

== Ammunition ==
Ammunition was of separate loading type with a cartridge case and a bagged charge which weighed 26.3 kg (58 lb).

Ammunition types:

- Armor piercing – Length: 61 cm (2 ft 0 in), Weight: 97 kg (214 lb)
- Common pointed- Length: 66.5 cm (30 in), Weight: 90 kg (200 lb)
- Shrapnel – Length: 53 cm (1 ft 9 in), Weight: 49.2 kg (108 lb)
