= Small nucleolar RNA SNORD30 =

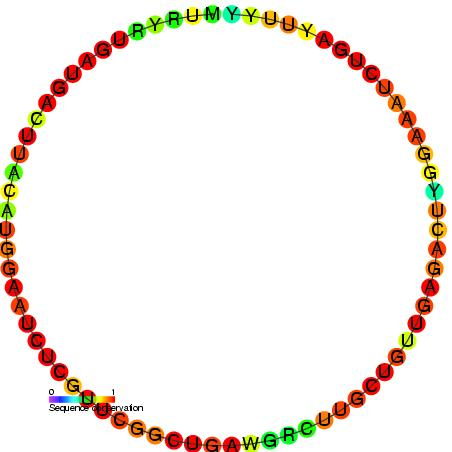
- Predicted secondary structure and sequence conservation of SNORD30

Identifiers
- Symbol: SNORD30
- Alt. Symbols: U30
- Rfam: RF00088

Other data
- RNA type: Gene; snRNA; snoRNA; CD-box
- Domain: Eukaryota
- GO: GO:0006396 GO:0005730
- SO: SO:0000593
- PDB structures: PDBe

In molecular biology, Small nucleolar RNA SNORD30 (U30) is a member of the C/D class of snoRNA which contain the C (UGAUGA) and D (CUGA) box motifs. U30 is encoded within the U22 snoRNA host gene (UHG) in mammals and is thought to act as a 2'-O-ribose methylation guide for ribosomal RNA.
