= SMS Sankt Georg =

Armored cruiser of the Austro-Hungarian Navy

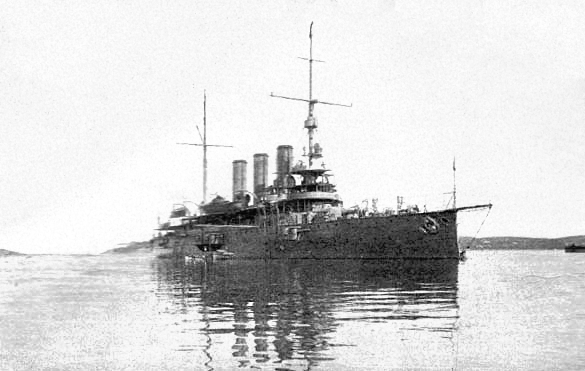

Class overview
- Preceded by: Kaiser Karl VI
- Succeeded by: None

History

Austro-Hungarian Empire
- Name: SMS Sankt Georg
- Namesake: Saint George
- Builder: Pola Navy Yard
- Laid down: 11 March 1901
- Launched: 8 December 1903
- Commissioned: 21 July 1905
- Fate: Ceded to Britain as a war prize, scrapped in 1920

General characteristics
- Type: Armored cruiser
- Displacement: Design: 7,289 long tons (7,406 t); Full load: 8,070 long tons (8,200 t)
- Length: 124.3 m (407 ft 10 in)
- Beam: 19.01 m (62 ft 4 in)
- Draft: 6.83 m (22 ft 5 in)
- Installed power: 12 × Yarrow boilers; 15,000 ihp (11,000 kW)
- Propulsion: 2 × triple expansion steam engines; 2 × screw propellers
- Speed: 22 knots (41 km/h; 25 mph)
- Complement: 630 officers and men
- Armament: 2 × 24 cm (9.4 in) G. L/40 S. guns; 5 × 19 cm (7.5 in) G. L/42 guns; 4 × 15 cm (5.9 in) L/40 guns; 1 × 7 cm (2.8 in) L/50 anti-aircraft gun; 8 × 7 cm (2.8 in) L/45 guns; 2 × 66 mm (2.6 in) L/18 landing guns; 6 × 47 mm (1.9 in) L/44 guns; 2 × 3.7 cm (1.5 in) L/33 guns; 2 × 45 cm (17.7 in) torpedo tubes
- Armor: Belt: 210 mm (8.3 in); Deck: 50 mm (2.0 in); Conning tower: 200 mm (7.9 in); Gun turrets: 210 mm

SMS Sankt Georg was the third and final armored cruiser of the Austro-Hungarian Navy. She was built at the Pola Arsenal; her keel was laid in March 1901, she was launched in December 1903, and completed in July 1905. Her design was based on the previous armored cruiser Kaiser Karl VI, with the primary improvement being a stronger armament. Sankt Georg, named for Saint George, was armed with a main battery of two 24-centimeter (9.4 in) guns, five 19 cm (7.5 in) guns, and four 15 cm (5.9 in) guns.

Sankt Georg served in the training and reserve squadrons during her peacetime career, usually alternating with Kaiser Karl VI. In April–May 1907, Sankt Georg participated in the Jamestown Exposition in the United States, to commemorate the first English colony in North America. During World War I, the Austro-Hungarian fleet largely remained inactive as a fleet in being, though she did bombard the Italian coast in May 1915 following the latter's declaration of war on Austria-Hungary. In 1917, she supported the Austro-Hungarian forces that raided the Otranto Barrage; in the ensuing Battle of the Strait of Otranto, Sankt Georg's arrival on the scene was sufficient to force the combined British, French and Italian forces to break off the engagement and retreat.

By February 1918, the crews of Sankt Georg and several other warships grew weary of the war and the long periods of inactivity, which led to the Cattaro Mutiny. The mutiny was quickly suppressed, but Sankt Georg and several other ships were subsequently decommissioned. Under the terms of the Treaty of Saint-Germain-en-Laye, Sankt Georg was awarded as a war prize to Britain. In 1920, she was sold to Italian ship breakers and scrapped thereafter.

== Design ==
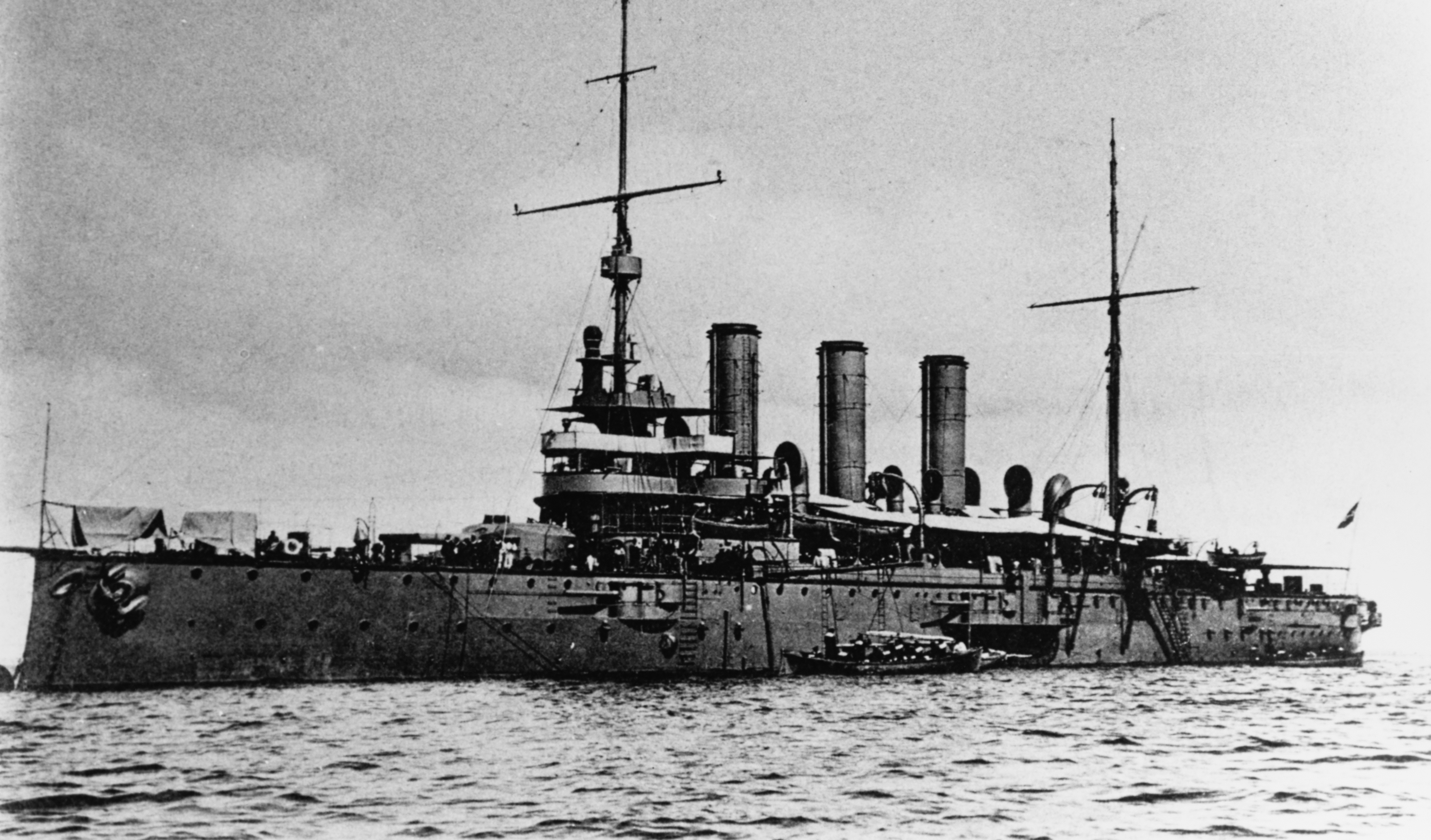
The armored cruiser Kaiser Karl VI

In the late 1880s, the Austro-Hungarian Navy began experimenting with the ideas of the French Jeune École (Young School), which suggested that flotillas of cheap torpedo boats could effectively defend a coastline against a fleet of expensive battleships. The Austro-Hungarian Marinekommandant (Navy Commander) at the time, Vizeadmiral (Vice Admiral) Maximilian Daublebsky von Sterneck, led the decision to adopt the strategy, which involved building cruisers—to which he referred as "torpedo-ram cruisers"—to support the torpedo boat flotillas. But by 1891, opponents of Sterneck had coalesced and forced him to delay further cruiser construction in favor of new capital ships—what became the Monarch-class coastal defense ships—until 1895 when the cruiser Kaiser Karl VI was authorized.

By 1899, the Navy had begun planning for the next armored cruiser, provisionally named "Ram Cruiser E". The initial design, prepared in July that year, amounted to a minor improvement over Kaiser Karl VI, with an extra pair of 15 cm (5.9 in) guns in the secondary battery. By April 1900, the design staff had begun to consider the possibility of increasing the caliber of the secondary guns to 19 cm (7.6 in), though most senior officers preferred the faster-firing 15 cm guns. Two new proposals were submitted, both of which retained the 15 cm guns; the first kept the single-gun turret arrangement of the main battery that had been used for Kaiser Karl VI, but relocated the secondary guns to a central battery on the upper deck, just aft of the conning tower, rather than the casemates of the earlier vessel. The second proposal adopted a twin-gun turret for the main battery 24 cm (9.4 in) guns located forward and placed the secondary guns further aft.

The construction of the Italian Giuseppe Garibaldi-class cruisers, which were armed with 25.4 cm (10 in) and 20.3 cm (8 in) guns, prompted the Austro-Hungarians to reconsider their preference for the smaller gun. Another design, which incorporated the 19 cm gun, was then submitted; as a compromise, it retained four of the 15 cm guns, which were placed in casemates in the main deck abreast of the gun turrets. The two 24 cm guns were mounted in a twin turret forward, and a single 19 cm gun was carried in a turret aft. Four more 19 cm guns were mounted in casemates amidships. This submission was approved and became the cruiser Sankt Georg. The finalized design represented a significant improvement over Kaiser Karl VI; beside the much heavier gun armament, Sankt Georg was about 1,000 long tons (1,000 t) heavier than her predecessor, 2 knots (3.7 km/h; 2.3 mph) faster, and better-protected through the use of Krupp armor rather than the Harvey steel used in the earlier ship.

=== General characteristics and machinery ===
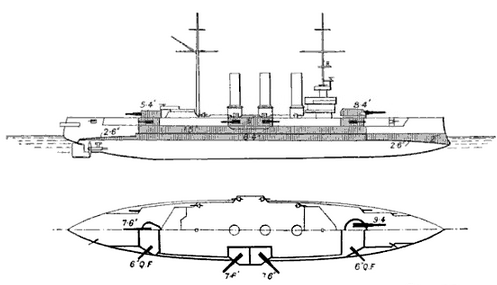
Line-drawing of Sankt Georg showing the arrangement of the main battery and armor

Sankt Georg was 123.23 meters (404 ft 4 in) long at the waterline and was 124.3 m (407 ft 10 in) long overall. She had a beam of 19.01 m (62 ft 4 in) and a draft of 6.83 m (22 ft 5 in). She displaced 7,289 long tons (7,406 t) as designed and up to 8,070 long tons (8,200 t) at full load. Her crew numbered 630 officers and men. Sankt Georg was fitted with two pole masts for observation. Steering was controlled by a single rudder.

The ship's propulsion system consisted of two 4-cylinder triple-expansion steam engines that drove a pair of screw propellers. Steam was provided by twelve coal-fired Yarrow water-tube boilers that were trunked into three funnels on the centerline. The engines were rated at 15,000 indicated horsepower (11,000 kW) and produced a top speed of 22 knots (41 km/h; 25 mph). On her full-power trials, she reached 15,271 ihp (11,388 kW) and 22.01 kn (40.76 km/h; 25.33 mph). Coal storage amounted to 600 long tons (610 t) normally and up to 1,000 long tons (1,000 t) at combat loading. The latter allowed the ship to steam for 4,500 nautical miles (8,300 km; 5,200 mi) at a cruising speed of 10 knots (19 km/h; 12 mph).

=== Armament and armor ===
Sankt Georg was armed with a main battery of two large-caliber guns and several medium-caliber pieces. She carried two 24-centimeter (9.4 in) G. L/40 S. guns in a twin-gun turret on the centerline forward. These guns fired a 229-kilogram (505 lb) shell at a muzzle velocity of 725 meters per second (2,380 ft/s), at a maximum range of 10,000 m (11,000 yd). Each gun, manufactured by Škoda Works, was supplied with forty high-explosive and forty armor-piercing shells. The guns were housed in electrically trained turrets that allowed elevation to 20° and depression to −4°. Five 19 cm (7.5 in) G. L/42 guns and four 15 cm (5.9 in) L/40 guns, all mounted individually in casemates with one of the 19 cm (7.5 in) G. L/42 on a single turret aft, rounded out her offensive armament. Sankt Georg carried 120 rounds for each of the 19 cm guns and 180 rounds for the 15 cm pieces.

A battery of nine 7 cm (2.8 in) L/45 guns, six 47 mm (1.9 in) L/44 quick-firing guns (QF) and two 3.7 cm (1.5 in) L/33 QF guns provided close-range defense against torpedo boats. The 7 cm guns had an actual caliber of 6.6 cm (2.6 in). They had a rate of fire of twenty rounds per minute, and each gun was supplied with 400 rounds of ammunition. The 4.7 cm guns had a rate of fire of 25 rounds per minute, and were typically stocked with 500 rounds. She carried several smaller weapons, including a pair of 8-millimeter (0.31 in) machine guns and two 7 cm (2.8 in) L/18 landing guns. One Škoda 7 cm K10 anti-aircraft gun was installed in 1916. Sankt Georg was also equipped with a pair of 45 cm (17.7 in) torpedo tubes, one on each broadside.

The ship was protected by a main armored belt that was 210 mm (8.3 in) thick in the central portion that protected the ammunition magazines and machinery spaces, and reduced to 165 mm (6.5 in) on either end. Transverse armored bulkheads that were 190 mm (7.5 in) thick capped the armored belt on either end. She had an armored deck that was 36–50 mm (1.4–2.0 in) thick. Her two gun turrets had 210 mm thick faces, and the conning tower had 200 mm (7.9 in) thick sides.

== Service history ==
On 11 March 1901, the keel for Sankt Georg was laid down at the Pola Arsenal. She was launched on 8 December 1903, and completed on 21 July 1905. Starting from her commissioning, Sankt Georg frequently served in the training squadron, along with the three Habsburg-class battleships, though she alternated in the squadron with the armored cruiser 'Kaiser Karl VI. Once the summer training schedule was completed each year, the ships of the training squadron were demobilized in the reserve squadron, which was held in a state of partial readiness.

In April 1907, Sankt Georg and the protected cruiser Aspern were sent to the United States to represent Austria-Hungary at the Jamestown Exposition, the commemoration of the 300th anniversary of the Jamestown colony, the first permanent English settlement in the Americas. In addition to the celebration at Jamestown, Sankt Georg also visited Annapolis and New York City while on the trip. In addition to the Austro-Hungarian delegation, the international fleet consisted of warships from Great Britain, Japan, Germany, France, Italy, and several other nations. The event started on 26 April, and over the following two weeks, the crews from many of the ships, including Sankt Georg, competed in various sailing and rowing races. Of eighteen races, Sankt Georg's crew placed in six, winning two.

=== World War I ===
On 28 June 1914, Archduke Franz Ferdinand, the heir to the Austro-Hungarian throne, was assassinated in Sarajevo; the assassination sparked the July Crisis and ultimately the First World War, which broke out a month later on 28 July. The German battlecruiser SMS Goeben, which had been assigned to the Mediterranean Division, sought the protection of the Austro-Hungarian fleet, and so Admiral Anton Haus sent the fleet, including Sankt Georg, south on 7 August to assist his German ally. Goeben's commander, Admiral Wilhelm Souchon, intended to use the Austro-Hungarian move as a feint to distract the British Mediterranean Fleet which was pursuing the Germans; Souchon instead took his ship to Constantinople in the Ottoman Empire. Their decoy mission complete, Sankt Georg and the rest of the fleet returned to port without engaging any British forces.

Following the Italian declaration of war against the Central Powers on 23 May 1915, the entire Austro-Hungarian fleet sortied to bombard Italian coastal targets. Sankt Georg took part in the operation; escorted by a pair of torpedo boats, she shelled the city of Rimini. She damaged a railroad bridge and was not engaged by Italian forces. Thereafter, the Austro-Hungarians returned to their strategy of serving as a fleet in being, which would tie down Allied naval forces. Haus hoped that torpedo boats and mines could be used to reduce the numerical superiority of the Italian fleet before a decisive battle could be fought. For most of the war, Sankt Georg was assigned to the Cruiser Flotilla and based at Cattaro, though she was too slow to operate with the newer Novara-class cruisers that carried out the bulk of offensive operations.

==== Battle of the Strait of Otranto ====
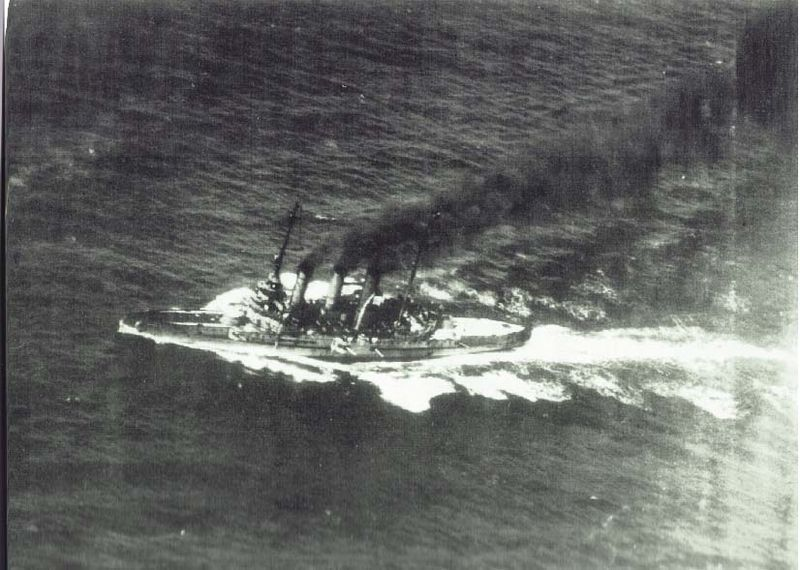
Sankt Georg underway

During the Battle of the Strait of Otranto on 15 May 1917, Sankt Georg was deployed to support the three light cruisers commanded by Captain Miklós Horthy—Novara, Saida, and Helgoland—that had raided the Otranto Barrage in the southern Adriatic. After completing their attack on the Allied defenses, the three cruisers turned north before being engaged by British and Italian warships, including the British cruiser HMS Dartmouth. Horthy called for reinforcements, which led Sankt Georg to sortie, accompanied by two destroyers and four torpedo boats. The Austro-Hungarians hoped that Sankt Georg might cut off the weaker Allied cruisers and destroy them.

While Sankt Georg was steaming to join the battle, Novara was hit by shells from Dartmouth that damaged her boilers, significantly reducing her speed. She soon broke down but at the same time, shortly after 11:00, most of the Allied warships broke off the engagement, having spotted smoke on the horizon from Austro-Hungarian reinforcements. By that time, Sankt Georg was still about 25 nautical miles (46 km; 29 mi) away. While Dartmouth and the other Allied ships were withdrawing, several Italian destroyers closed to attack the stricken Novara and her sister ships. Heavy Austro-Hungarian fire drove them off and by 12:07 they had retreated with the rest of the Anglo-Italian ships. Sankt Georg arrived and Saida took Novara under tow for the voyage back to port. The four cruisers assembled in line-ahead formation, with Sankt Georg the last vessel in the line, to cover the other three ships. Later in the afternoon, the old coastal defense ship Budapest and three more torpedo boats joined the ships to strengthen the escort.

==== Cattaro Mutiny ====
By early 1918, the long periods of inactivity had begun to wear on the crews of several warships at Cattaro, including Sankt Georg. At this time, Sankt Georg was the flagship of the Cruiser Flotilla, commanded by Konteradmiral (Rear Admiral) Alexander Hansa. On 1 February, the Cattaro Mutiny broke out, starting aboard Sankt Georg. An enlisted man shot the ship's executive officer in the head, badly injuring him, when mutineers seized control of the ship. They then rapidly gained control of Kaiser Karl VI and most of the other major warships in the harbor. There was some resistance to the mutiny by crewmembers; the wireless operators aboard Sankt Georg prevented a message announcing the mutiny from being sent to the rest of the fleet and the crews of the more active vessels tended to oppose the rebellion. A tense stand-off began between the rebel and loyalist ships in the harbor: the destroyer Csepel steamed out and trained her torpedo tubes at Sankt Georg, before being recalled by Hansa's chief of staff. Helgoland's commander, Erich Heyssler, also moved to prepare his ship's torpedoes but Sankt Georg's gunners aimed their 24 cm guns at Helgoland, which convinced Heyssler to back down.

The mutineers issued a lengthy list of demands, that ranged from longer periods of leave to and end to the war, based on the United States President Woodrow Wilson's Fourteen Points. The following day, many of the mutinous ships abandoned the effort and rejoined loyalist forces in the inner harbor; first the light cruisers and most of the torpedo boats escaped from the guns of the mutineers, followed by several of the other larger vessels. By late in the day, only the men aboard Sankt Georg and a handful of destroyers and torpedo boats remained in rebellion. Only on the morning of 3 February, after the arrival of the Erzherzog Karl-class battleships of the III Division, were the last of the mutineers convinced to surrender. Trials on the ringleaders commenced quickly, and four men were executed, including the sailor who had shot Sankt Georg's executive officer.

=== Fate ===
In the aftermath of the Cattaro Mutiny, most of the obsolete warships of the Austro-Hungarian Navy, including Sankt Georg, were decommissioned to reduce the number of idle warships. On 3 November 1918, the Austro-Hungarian government signed the Armistice of Villa Giusti with Italy, ending their participation in the conflict. After the end of the war, Sankt Georg was ceded as a war prize to Great Britain, under the terms of the Treaty of Saint-Germain-en-Laye. She was then sold to ship breakers in Italy and broken up for scrap after 1920.

== See also ==
- Euro gold and silver commemorative coins (Austria), one of which commemorates Sankt Georg's visit to the United States.
