= German submarine U-30 =

U-30 may refer to one of the following German submarines:

- SM U-30 (Germany), was a Type U 27 submarine launched in 1913 and that served in the First World War until surrendered on 22 November 1918
  - During the First World War, Germany also had these submarines with similar names:
    - SM UB-30, a Type UB II submarine launched in 1915 and sunk on 13 August 1918
    - SM UC-30, a Type UC II submarine launched in 1916 and sunk on 21 April 1917
- German submarine U-30 (1936), a Type VIIA submarine that served in the Second World War until scuttled on 4 May 1945
- German submarine U-30 (S179), a Type 206 submarine of the Bundesmarine that was launched in 1975
