= Škoda 24 cm L/40 K97 =

- Type: Naval gun
- Place of origin: German Empire

Service history
- In service: 1904–1918
- Used by: Austria-Hungary
- Wars: World War I

Production history
- Designer: Krupp
- Designed: 1897
- Manufacturer: Škoda
- Produced: 1904
- Variants: Škoda 24 cm L/40 K/01

Specifications
- Mass: K97: 28.3 t (31.2 short tons); K/01: 28.6 t (31.5 short tons)
- Length: 9.6 m (31 ft 6 in)
- Barrel length: 8.8 m (28 ft 10 in)
- Shell: Separate loading cased charges and projectiles
- Shell weight: 229 kg (505 lb)
- Caliber: 24 cm (9.4 in) 40 caliber
- Breech: Horizontal sliding-wedge
- Recoil: Hydro-pneumatic
- Elevation: -4° to +20°
- Traverse: -130° to +130°
- Rate of fire: K97: 2 rpm K/01: 2.5 rpm
- Muzzle velocity: K97: 705 m/s (2,310 ft/s); K/01: 725 m/s (2,380 ft/s)
- Maximum firing range: 12 km (7.5 mi) at +16.25°

The Škoda 24 cm L/40 K97 was an Austro-Hungarian naval gun developed in the years before World War I that armed a class of pre-dreadnought battleships and armored cruisers of the Austro-Hungarian Navy. The actual bore diameter was 23.8 cm (9.4 in), but the classification system for artillery rounded up to the next highest centimeter.

== History ==
The origins of the Škoda 24 cm L/40 K97 lay in an earlier gun designed and built by the Krupp company in Germany. In 1894 Krupp designed the 24 cm SK L/40 and started production in 1898 for the Imperial German Navy's pre-dreadnought battleships and armored cruisers. Krupp produced a variant of the 24 cm SK L/40 for the Austro-Hungarian Navy called the 24 cm L/40 K94 which armed their armored cruiser SMS Kaiser Karl VI, the pre-dreadnought Habsburg-class battleships and the Monarch-class coastal defense ships. In 1897 Škoda bought a production license from Krupp and began production in 1904 at the Škoda Works in Plzeň of the Škoda 24 cm L/40 K97 and later the Škoda designed 24 cm L/40 K/01. Both Germany and Austria-Hungary developed their own ammunition with differing weights and lengths, however their ballistic performance was similar.

== Construction ==
The 24 cm SK L/40 was the first large caliber German naval gun to use a Krupp horizontal sliding-wedge breech block and separate loading metallic cased propellant charges and projectiles. Unlike other large naval guns of the time which used separate loading bagged charges and projectiles, this gun used charges inside of a brass cartridge case to provide obturation. It is believed that the K94 and the K97 were both constructed of A tube, three layers of reinforcing hoops and a jacket.

== Naval artillery ==
The Škoda 24 cm L/40 K97 was the primary armament of the Erzherzog Karl-class of pre-dreadnought battleships of the Austro-Hungarian Navy. The Krupp built K94 guns of the unique armored cruiser SMS Kaiser Karl VI were later replaced with Škoda built K97 guns during a refit in 1916. While the Škoda designed 24 cm L/40 K/01 armed the unique armored cruiser SMS Sankt Georg.

Ship details:
- Erzherzog Karl-class - The three ships of this class had a primary armament of four guns, which were mounted in two twin gun turrets, one fore and one aft of the central superstructure.
- SMS Kaiser Karl VI - This ship had a primary armament of two K94 guns later replaced with K97 guns, which were mounted in two single gun turrets, one fore and one aft of the central superstructure.
- SMS Sankt Georg - This ship had a primary armament of two Škoda designed 24 cm L/40 K/01 guns, which were mounted in two single gun turrets, one fore and one aft of the central superstructure.

== Bibliography ==
- Friedman, Norman (2011). Naval Weapons of World War One. Barnsley, South Yorkshire, UK: Seaforth. ISBN 978-1-84832-100-7.
