= Otranto Barrage =

Naval Blockade during WW1

Coordinates: 40.2167°N 18.9167°E

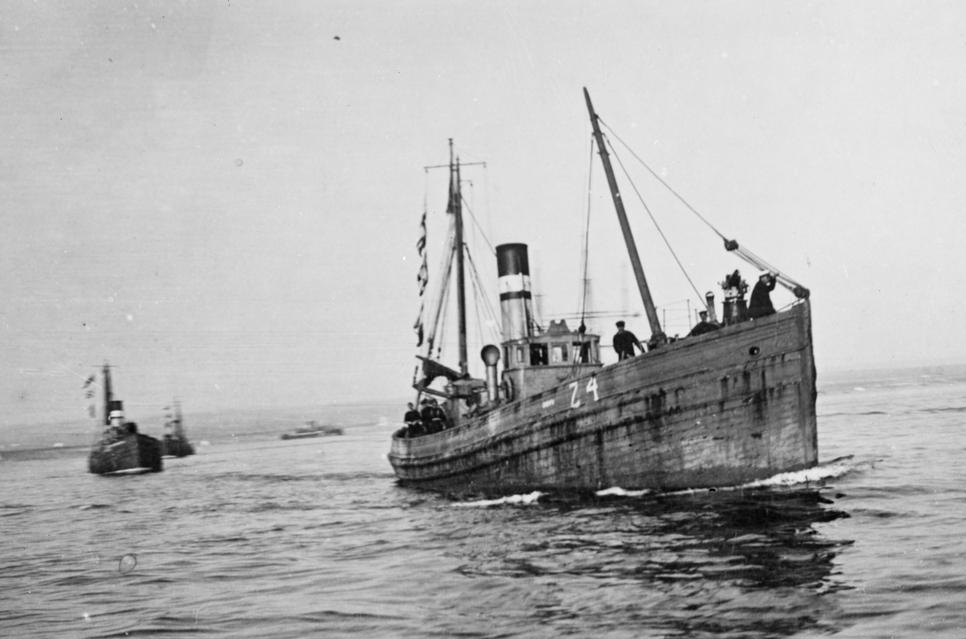
British drifters sailing from their base in the Adriatic to man the Otranto Barrage

The Otranto Barrage was an Allied naval blockade of the Strait of Otranto between Brindisi in Italy and Corfu on the Greek side of the Adriatic Sea in the First World War. The operation consisted of over 200 vessels at the height of the blockade. The blockade was intended to prevent the Austro-Hungarian Navy from escaping into the Mediterranean and threatening Allied operations there. The blockade was effective in preventing surface ships from escaping the Adriatic, but it had little or no effect on the submarines based at Cattaro.

== Blockade attempt ==
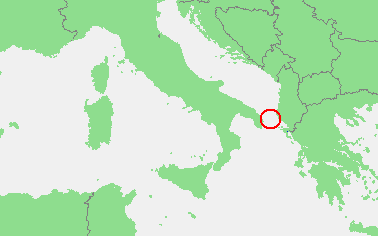
Location of the Otranto Barrage

The Adriatic is 72 km (39 nmi; 45 mi) wide at the Otranto Straits. The blockade consisted of over 200 vessels at its height, mainly British and French. A main force of up to 60 drifters were dedicated to anti-submarine operations. The drifters were mostly British and typically armed with a 6-pounder gun and depth charges. In 1915 when the blockade was begun, two divisions of 20 would be on patrol at a time, equipped with steel indicator nets intended to trap submarines or at least alert the surface vessels to their presence. A third division would be at Brindisi. The drifters were supported by destroyers and aircraft. However, the demands of the Gallipoli Campaign and other naval operations left the Otranto Barrage with insufficient resources to deter the U-boats, and only the Austro-Hungarian U-6 was caught by the indicator nets during the course of the war (other submarines were sunk by mines of the barrage: UB53, and probably UB44 and U30). It was later considered that the straits had simply been too wide to be netted, mined or patrolled effectively.

The ease with which German and Austrian submarines continued out of the Austro-Hungarian ports in spite of the barrage (and the success they had in disrupting shipping in the whole of the Mediterranean) strongly embarrassed the Allies, the system being called "a large sieve through which U-boats could pass with impunity". In 1917–1918, reinforcements from the Australian and American navies brought the blockading force up to 35 destroyers, 52 drifters and more than 100 other vessels. Nevertheless, submarines continued to slip through until the end of the war; the introduction of the convoy system and better coordination amongst the Allies only helped to cut the losses they were causing after escaping the blockade.

By contrast, the presence of Allied capital ships involved in the blockade was generally successful in its mission of keeping enemy surface vessels from leaving the Adriatic Sea.

== Raids and battles ==
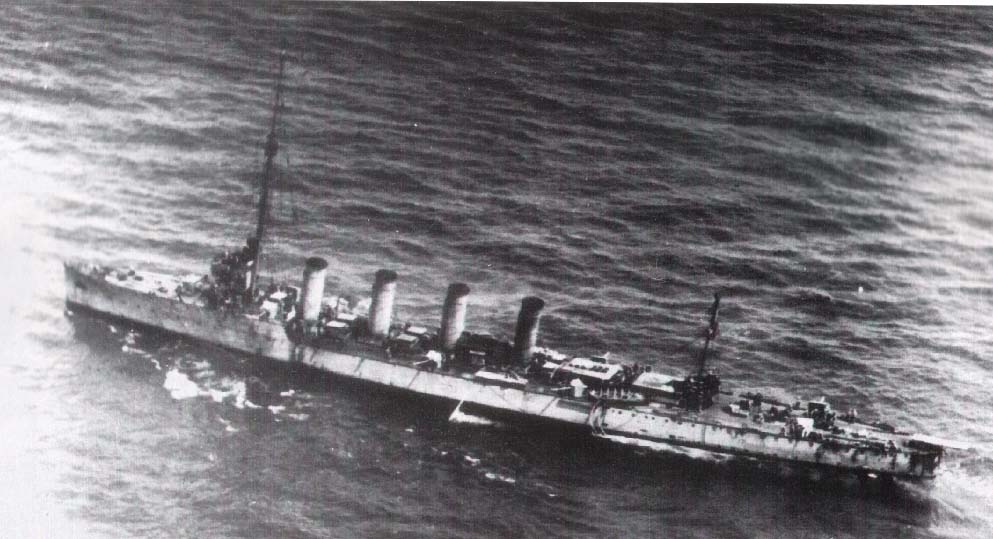
The damaged Austro-Hungarian cruiser Novara after the battle of the Otranto Straits, 15 May 1917

The Austrians mounted nighttime raids against the barrage, five in 1915, nine in 1916 and ten in 1917. After a raid by four Huszár-class destroyers in December 1916, a conference in London concluded that the drifters were insufficiently defended. The barrage was placed under the command of a British officer, Commodore Algernon Walker-Heneage-Vivian, who was able to call upon all Allied ships not in use elsewhere. His second-in-command was another British officer, Commander Charles Edward Turle. The largest raid was carried out on the night of 14/15 May 1917 by the cruisers SMS Novara, Helgoland, and Saida supported by the destroyers SMS Csepel and Balaton and Austro-Hungarian U-boats U-4 and U-27, along with German U-boat UC-25 (operating as Austro-Hungarian U-boat U-89). The fleet, commanded by Commodore Miklós Horthy, sank 14 drifters out of 47 on duty, and damaged a further three seriously.

Skipper Joseph Watt was later awarded the Victoria Cross for defending his drifter Gowanlea under heavy attack from Novara. The British light cruisers HMS Dartmouth and Bristol—together with Italian and French destroyers, under command of Italian Rear Admiral Alfredo Acton—steamed from Brindisi to engage the Austrians, resulting in the Battle of the Otranto Straits. The British damaged Saida and disabled Novara, severely injuring Horthy. However, the British cruisers broke off the engagement when the Italian flag officer received notice of heavy Austrian forces coming out of Cattaro. Saida towed Novara back to port. Dartmouth was damaged by UC-25 as it returned to Brindisi. The night before, the same U-boat had laid a minefield at the mouth of Brindisi harbour; the Boutefeu struck one of these mines exiting the harbour the very same day and exploded, sinking with all hands.

In June 1918, Horthy—by now commander-in-chief of the Austro-Hungarian Navy—decided to launch an attack on the barrage employing the four Tegetthoff-class battleships based at Pola, the most modern in the fleet. While en route down the Adriatic, the battleship SMS Szent István was torpedoed and sunk by an Italian torpedo boat at dawn on 10 June, resulting in the attack being cancelled.
