= SMS Zrínyi =

Austro-Hungarian battleship

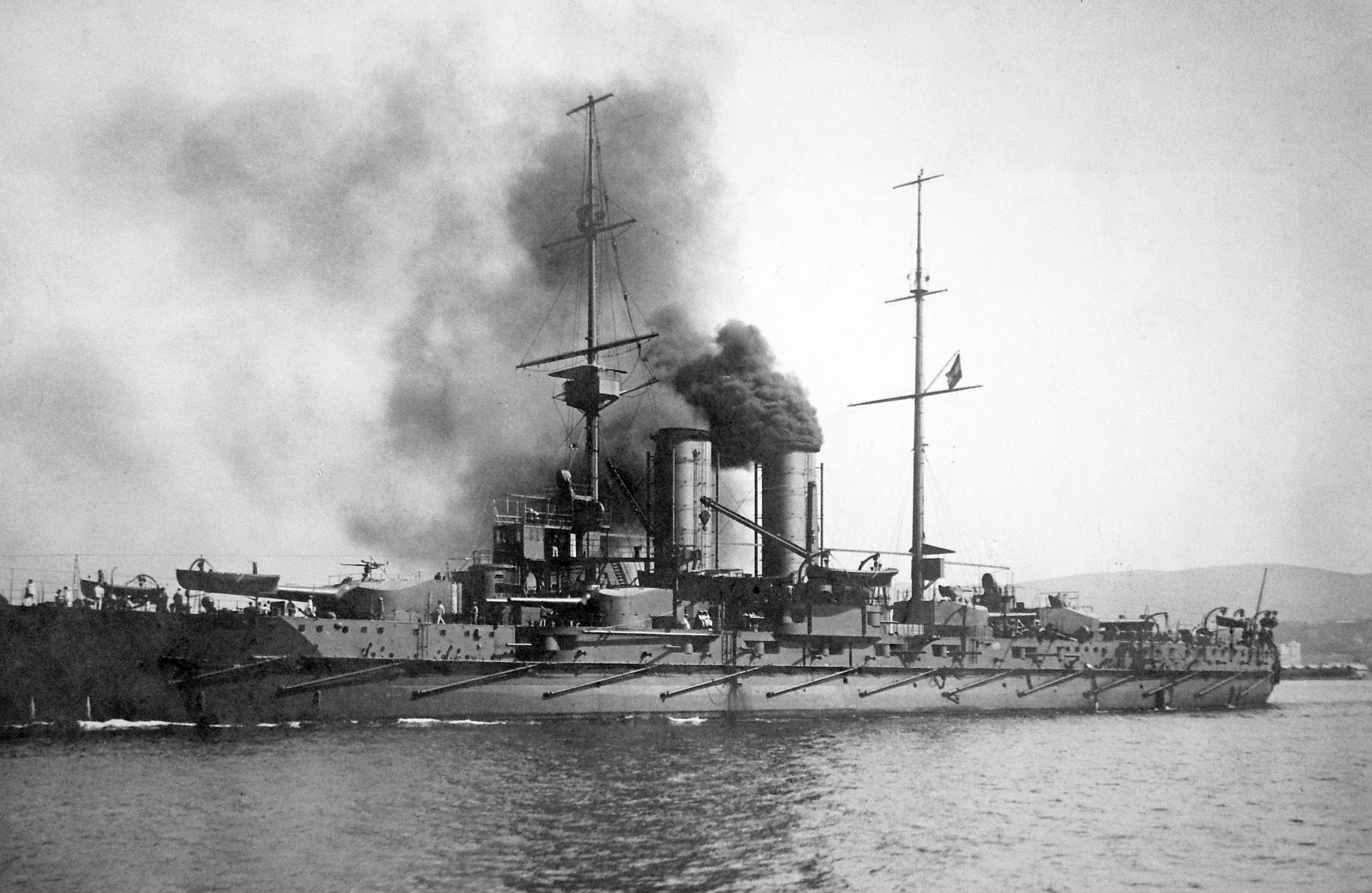
- SMS Zrínyi in 1918

History

Austria-Hungary
- Name: SMS Zrínyi
- Namesake: House of Zrinski
- Builder: Stabilimento Tecnico Triestino
- Laid down: 15 November 1908
- Launched: 12 April 1910
- Completed: July 1911
- Commissioned: 22 November 1911
- Decommissioned: 22 November 1919

United States
- Name: USS Zrínyi
- Commissioned: 22 November 1919
- Decommissioned: 7 November 1920
- Fate: Turned over to Italy, ultimately scrapped

General characteristics
- Class & type: Radetzky-class battleship
- Displacement: 14,500 long tons (14,733 t)
- Length: 139 m (456 ft)
- Beam: 25 m (82 ft)
- Draught: 8.1 m (26 ft 7 in)
- Propulsion: Two-shaft vertical triple expansion steam engines; 12 Yarrow-type coal-fired boilers; 20,000 hp
- Speed: 20 knots (23 mph; 37 km/h)
- Range: 4,000 nmi (7,400 km) at 10 kn (12 mph; 19 km/h); 1,350 tons coal
- Complement: 880–890 officers and men
- Armament: 4 × 30.5 cm (12.0 in) guns; 8 × 24 cm (9.4 in) guns; 20 × 10 cm (3.9 in) K10 rapid-fire cannons; 4 × 7 cm (2.8 in) anti-aircraft guns; 2 × 66 mm (2.6 in) L/18 landing guns; 4 × 47 mm (1.9 in) guns; 3 × 45 cm (18 in) torpedo tubes
- Armor: Belt: 230 mm (9.1 in); Deck: 48 mm (1.9 in); Bulkhead: 54 mm (2.1 in); Main turrets: 250 mm (9.8 in); Secondary turrets: 200 mm (7.9 in); Casemate: 120 mm (4.7 in); Conning tower: 250 mm (9.8 in)

SMS Zrínyi (Note: "SMS" stands for "Seiner Majestät Schiff" ("His Majesty's Ship") in German.) ("His Majesty's ship Zrínyi" Hungarian pronunciation: [ˈzriːɲi]) was a Radetzky-class semi-dreadnought battleship (Schlachtschiff) of the Austro-Hungarian Navy (K.u.K. Kriegsmarine), named for the Zrinski, a Croatian-Hungarian noble family (Hungarian: Zrínyi). Zrínyi and her sisters, Erzherzog Franz Ferdinand and Radetzky, were the last pre-dreadnoughts built for the Austro-Hungarian Navy. (Note: Although SMS Zrínyi was laid down and commissioned after the launching of HMS Dreadnought in 1906, her design was begun before and had the characteristics of a pre-dreadnought battleship rather than later post-dreadnought battleships.)

During World War I, Zrínyi saw action in the Adriatic Sea. She served with the Second Division of the Austro-Hungarian Navy's battleships and shelled Senigallia as part of the bombardment of the key seaport of Ancona, Italy, during May 1915. However, Allied control of the Strait of Otranto meant that the Austro-Hungarian Navy was effectively contained in the Adriatic. Nonetheless, the presence of the Zrínyi and other battleships tied down a substantial force of Allied ships.

With the war going against the Austrians by the end of 1918, Zrínyi was prepared for transfer to the new State of Slovenes, Croats and Serbs. On 10 November 1918, just one day before the end of the war, navy officers sailed the battleship out of Pola (Pula) and surrendered to a squadron of American submarine chasers. Following the handover to the United States Navy, she was briefly designated USS Zrínyi. In the Treaty of Saint-Germain-en-Laye, the transfer was not recognized; instead, Zrínyi was given to Italy and broken up for scrap.

== Design and construction ==
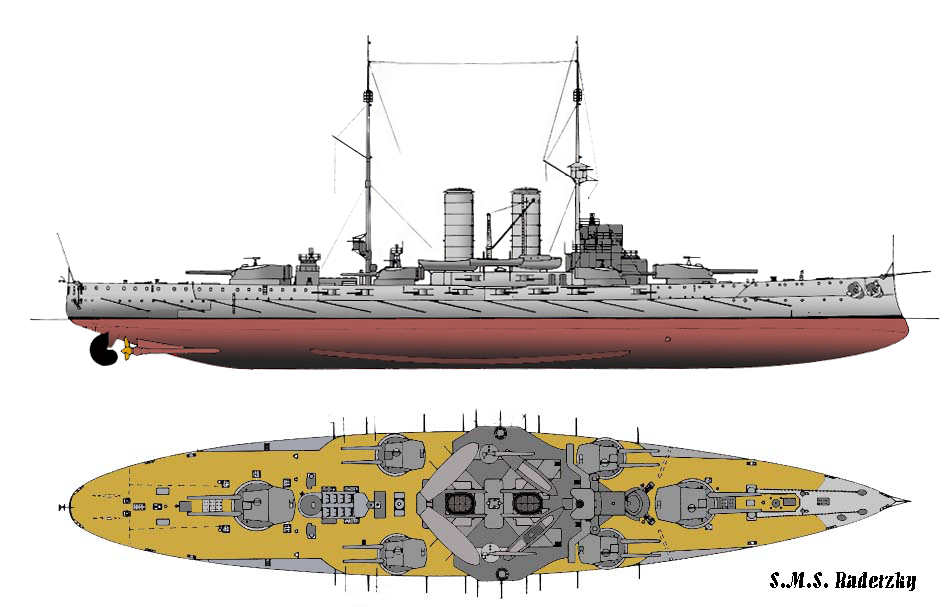
Plan of SMS Radetzky, a sister ship of SMS Zrínyi

Zrínyi was built at the Stabilimento Tecnico Triestino dockyard in Trieste, the same place where her sister ships were built earlier. She was laid down on 15 November 1908 and launched from the slipway on 12 April 1910. The teak used on Zrínyi's deck was the only material Austria-Hungary had to purchase abroad to build the ship. The ship was completed by 15 July 1911, and on 22 November 1911 she was commissioned into the fleet. She was the last ship of the class to be completed and had a crew of 880 to 890 officers and men.

Zrínyi was 138.8 m (455 ft 4 in) long, and had a beam of 24.6 m (80 ft 8 in) and a draft of 8.1 m (26 ft 9 in). She displaced 14,508 long tons (14,741 t) normally, and up to 15,845 long tons (16,099 t) with a full combat load. She was powered by two-shaft four-cylinder vertical triple expansion engines rated at 19,800 indicated horsepower. The ship had a top speed of 20.5 knots (38.0 km/h; 23.6 mph). Zrínyi was the first warship in the Austro-Hungarian Navy to use fuel oil to supplement her 12 Yarrow-type coal-fired boilers. She had a maximum range of 4,000 nautical miles (7,400 km; 4,600 mi) at a cruising speed of 10 knots (19 km/h; 12 mph).

The ship's primary armament consisted of four 30.5 cm (12 in) 45-caliber guns in two twin gun turrets. This was augmented by a heavy secondary battery of eight 24 cm (9.4 in) guns in four wing turrets. The tertiary battery consisted of twenty 10 cm L/50 guns in casemated single mounts, four 47 mm (1.9 in) (1.85 in) L/44 and one 47 mm L/33 quick-firing guns. Furthermore, the ship's boats were equipped with two 66 mm (2.6 in) L/18 landing guns for operations ashore. After 1916–17 refits four Škoda 7 cm K16 anti-aircraft guns were installed. Three 45 cm (17.7 in) torpedo tubes were also carried, one on each broadside and one in the stern.

== Service history ==
The ship was assigned to the Austro-Hungarian Fleet's 1st Battle Squadron after her 1911 commissioning. In 1912, Zrínyi and her two sister ships conducted two training cruises into the eastern Mediterranean Sea. On the second cruise into the Aegean Sea, conducted from November to December, Zrínyi and her sister ships were accompanied by the cruiser SMS Admiral Spaun and a pair of destroyers. After returning to Pola, the entire fleet mobilized for possible hostilities, as tensions flared in the Balkans.

In 1913, Zrínyi participated in an international naval demonstration in the Ionian Sea to protest the Balkan Wars. Ships from other navies included in the demonstration were the British pre-dreadnought HMS King Edward VII, the Italian pre-dreadnought Ammiraglio di Saint Bon, the French armored cruiser Edgar Quinet, and the German light cruiser SMS Breslau. The most important action of the combined flotilla, which was under the command of British Admiral Cecil Burney, was to blockade the Montenegrin coast. The goal of the blockade was to prevent Serbian reinforcements from supporting the siege at Scutari, where Montenegro had besieged a combined force of Albanians and Ottomans. Pressured by the international blockade, Serbia withdrew its army from Scutari, which was subsequently occupied by a joint Allied ground force.

During that year, the first of four new dreadnoughts, SMS Viribus Unitis, that made up the Tegetthoff class—the only dreadnoughts built for the Austro-Hungarian Navy—came into active service. With the commissioning of these dreadnoughts, Zrínyi and her sisters were moved from the 1st Division to the 2nd Division of the 1st Battle Squadron.

=== World War I ===
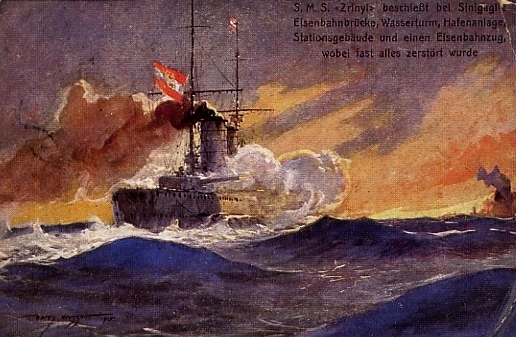
First World War postcard depicting SMS Zrínyi in action at Senigallia

At the time of the assassination of Archduke Franz Ferdinand of Austria on 28 June 1914, the battleships in the Austro-Hungarian Navy consisted of the Radetzky class, the Tegetthoff class (which still had one ship, SMS Szent István, under construction), the Erzherzog Karl class and finally, the older Habsburg class. Along with the remainder of the Austro-Hungarian Navy, Zrínyi was mobilized in late July 1914 to support the flight of SMS Goeben and SMS Breslau. The two German ships broke out of Messina, which was surrounded by the British navy and reached Turkey. The flotilla had advanced as far south as Brindisi in southeastern Italy when news of the successful breakout reached Vienna. The Austro-Hungarian ships were then recalled before seeing action.

On 23 May 1915, between two and four hours after news of the Italian declaration of war reached the main Austro-Hungarian naval base at Pola, (Note: There is some debate on when the fleet departed Pola. Halpern, p. 144 states that it was four hours until the fleet set sail while Sokol, p. 107 claims that the fleet left Pola two hours after the declaration reached Admiral Haus.) Zrínyi and the rest of the fleet departed to bombard the Italian and Montenegrin coast. Their focus was on the important naval base at Ancona, and later the coast of Montenegro. The bombardment of Montenegro was part of the larger Austro-Hungarian campaign against the Kingdoms of Montenegro and Serbia, which were members of the Entente, during the first half of 1915. The attack on Ancona was an immense success, and the ships were unopposed during the operation. The bombardment of the province and the surrounding area resulted in the destruction of an Italian steamer in the port of Ancona itself, and an Italian destroyer, Turbine, was severely damaged further south. On the shore, the infrastructure of the port of Ancona, as well as the surrounding towns, were severely damaged. The railroad yard in Ancona, as well as the port facilities in the town, were damaged or destroyed. The local shore batteries were also suppressed. During the bombardment, Zrínyi also helped to destroy a train, a railway station, and a bridge at Senigallia. Additional targets that were damaged or destroyed included wharves, warehouses, oil tanks, radio stations, and the local barracks. Sixty-three Italians, both civilians and military personnel, were killed in the bombardment. By the time Italian ships from Taranto and Brindisi arrived on the scene, the Austro-Hungarians were safely back in Pola.

The objective of the bombardment of Ancona was to delay the Italian Army from deploying its forces along the border with Austria-Hungary by destroying critical transportation systems. The surprise attack on Ancona succeeded in delaying the Italian deployment to the Alps for two weeks. This delay gave Austria-Hungary valuable time to strengthen its Italian border and re-deploy some of its troops from the Eastern and Balkan fronts.

Aside from the attack on Ancona, the Austro-Hungarian battleships were largely confined to Pola for the duration of the war. Their operations were limited by Admiral Anton Haus, the commander of the Austro-Hungarian Navy, who believed that he would need to husband his ships to counter any Italian attempt to seize the Dalmatian coast. Since coal was diverted to the newer Tegetthoff-class battleships, the remainder of the war saw Zrínyi and the rest of the Austro-Hungarian Navy acting as a fleet in being. This resulted in the Allied blockade of the Otranto Strait. With his fleet blockaded in the Adriatic Sea, and with a shortage of coal, Haus followed a strategy based on mines and submarines designed to reduce the numerical superiority of the Allied navies.

=== Post-war fate ===
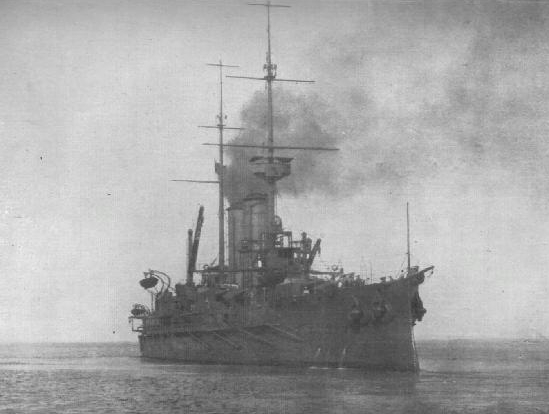
SMS Zrínyi after being handed over to the United States

After the Austro-Hungarian Empire collapsed in 1918, the Austrians wanted to turn the fleet over to the newly created State of Slovenes, Croats and Serbs (later to become a part of the Kingdom of Yugoslavia) in order to prevent the Italians from claiming the ships as spoils of war. However, the victorious Allies refused to acknowledge the conversations between the Austrians and the south Slavs and, in due course, reallocated the ships. The ship had been boarded by a scratch Yugoslav crew on 10 November 1918, one day before the Armistice, and had left Pola along with her sister ship, Radetzky. They were soon spotted by heavy Italian ships, so the two battleships hoisted American flags and sailed south along the Adriatic coast to Castelli Bay near Spalato (also known as Split). They appealed for American naval forces to meet them and accept their surrender, which a squadron of United States Navy (USN) submarine chasers in the area did. She had apparently been turned over to the fledgling south Slav state, as it was a Croat naval officer, Korvettenkapitän Marijan Polić, who presented the ship as a prize of war to representatives of the United States Navy on the afternoon of 22 November 1918 at Spalato (Split) in Dalmatia. Simultaneously she was commissioned as USS Zrínyi and Lieutenant E.E. Hazlett, USN, assumed command. The initial American complement consisted of four officers and 174 enlisted men—the latter entirely composed of United States Navy Reserve Force personnel. The ship remained at anchor at Spalato for nearly a year during the allied occupation of the eastern Adriatic while the negotiations that would determine her ultimate fate dragged on. Only once did she apparently turn her engines over, and that occurred during a severe gale that struck Spalato on 9 February 1920.

On the morning of 7 November 1920, Zrínyi was decommissioned. USS Chattanooga took her in tow and, assisted by Brooks and Hovey, towed the battleship to Italy. Under the terms of the treaties of Versailles and St. Germain, Zrínyi was ultimately turned over to the Italian government at Venice. She was broken up for scrap later that year and into 1921.
