= Radetzky-class battleship =

Austro-Hungarian navy ship class

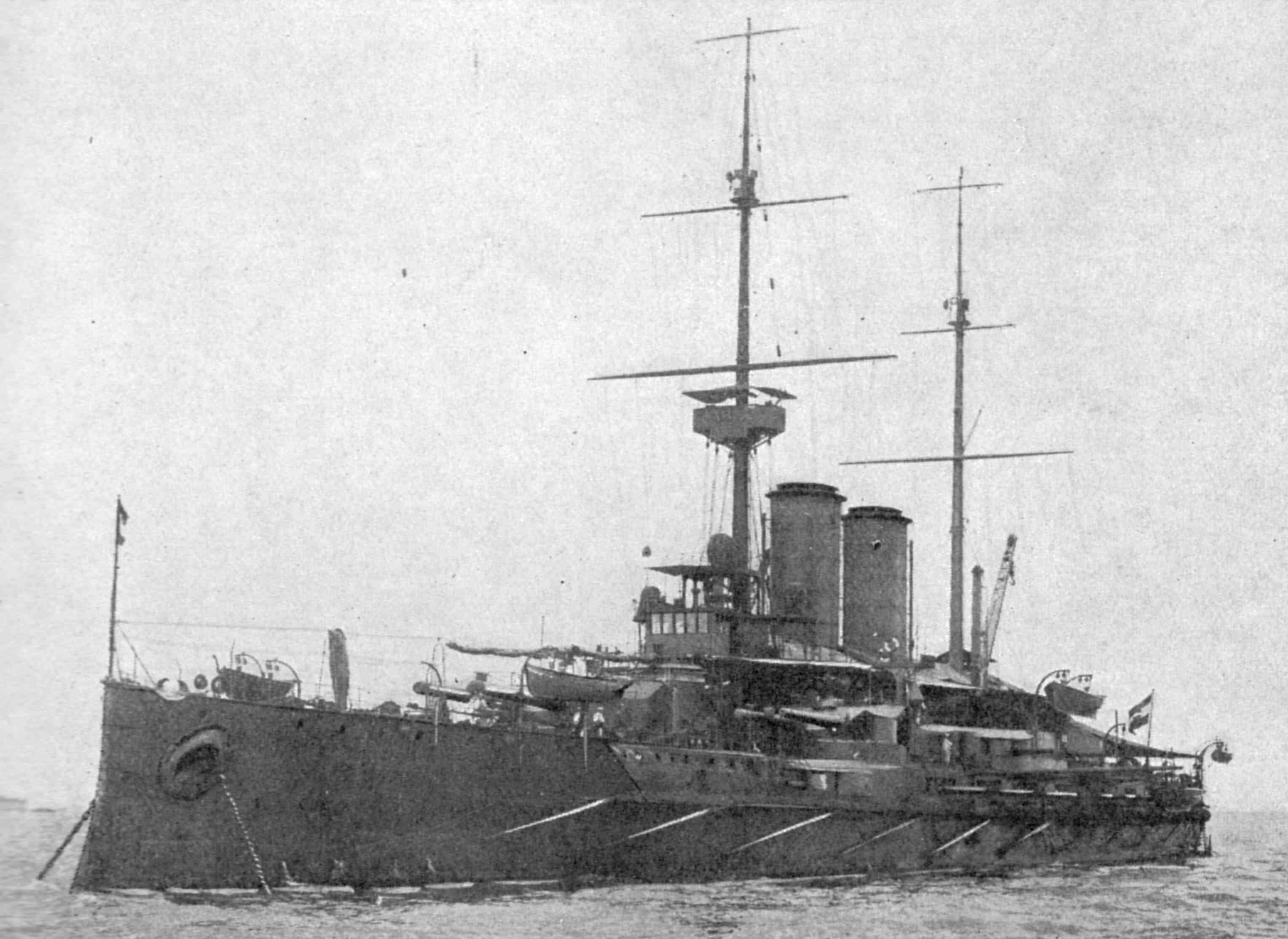
- SMS Radetzky

Class overview
- Name: Radetzky class
- Builders: Stabilimento Tecnico Triestino
- Operators: Austro-Hungarian Navy
- Preceded by: Erzherzog Karl class
- Succeeded by: Tegetthoff class
- In commission: 1908–1918
- Completed: 3
- Retired: 3

General characteristics
- Type: Pre-dreadnought battleship
- Displacement: Normal: 14,508 long tons (14,741 t); Full load: 15,845 long tons (16,099 t)
- Length: 137.5 m (451 ft 1 in)
- Beam: 24.6 m (80 ft 9 in)
- Draft: 8.1 m (26 ft 7 in)
- Installed power: 12 Yarrow boilers; 19,800 ihp (14,800 kW)
- Propulsion: 2 shaft vertical triple expansion steam engines
- Speed: 20.5 knots (23.6 mph; 38.0 km/h)
- Range: 4,000 nmi (7,400 km) at 10 kn (12 mph; 19 km/h); 1,350 tons coal
- Complement: 890
- Armament: 4 × 30.5 cm (12 in) guns; 8 × 24 cm (9.4 in) guns; 20 × 10 cm (3.9 in) K10 guns; 4 × 7 cm (2.8 in) anti-aircraft guns; 2 × 66 mm (2.6 in) L/18 landing guns; 4 × 47 mm (1.9 in) guns; 3 × 45 cm (17.7 in) torpedo tubes
- Armor: Belt: 230 mm (9.1 in); Deck: 48 mm (1.9 in); Bulkhead: 54 mm (2.1 in); Main turrets: 250 mm (9.8 in); Secondary turrets: 200 mm (7.9 in); Casemates: 120 mm (4.7 in); Conning tower: 250 mm

The Radetzky class was a group of three semi-dreadnought battleships built for the Austro-Hungarian Navy between 1907 and 1910. All ships were built by the STT shipyard in Trieste. They were the last pre-dreadnoughts built by the Austro-Hungarians, and the penultimate class of any type of Austro-Hungarian battleship completed. The class comprised three ships: Radetzky, Erzherzog Franz Ferdinand, and Zrínyi. They were armed with four 30.5-centimeter (12.0 in) guns in two twin turrets and eight 24 cm (9.4 in) guns in four twin turrets.

Commissioned only a few years before the outbreak of World War I, the ships had limited service careers. All three of the battleships conducted training cruises in the Mediterranean Sea in 1912. In 1913, they took part in an international naval demonstration in the Ionian Sea that protested the Balkan Wars. After Italy declared war on Austria-Hungary and the other Central Powers in 1915, the three Radetzky-class ships bombarded coastal targets in the Adriatic Sea. After 1915, their participation in the war became minimal. All three ships were handed over to Italy after the end of the war, and broken up for scrap between 1920 and 1926.

== Development ==
Design work for a new class of battleships started about two weeks after the launching of Erzherzog Friedrich, an Erzherzog Karl-class battleship, which took place on 30 April 1904. By the end of July 1905, the Austrian Commander in Chief of the Navy, Admiral Monteccuccoli, laid out his vision for an expanded Austro-Hungarian fleet. This included twelve battleships, four armored cruisers, eight scout cruisers, eighteen destroyers, thirty-six large torpedo boats, and six submarines. A navy design board evaluated five designs for the new battleship type between 25 and 29 September 1905.

The first task which needed to be accomplished before construction on any new ships could begin was securing the necessary funding. While naval spending was growing rapidly after 1905, particularly a result of the patronage of Archduke Franz Ferdinand, the heir to the Austro-Hungarian throne; he and Montecuccoli had succeeded in attracting public support, neither the budgets of 1905 or 1906 included spending allocations for an additional class of battleships. With construction on the Erzherzog Friedrich and Erzherzog Ferdinand Max nearly completion in April and May 1905, two large slipways at the Stabilimento Tecnico Triestino in Trieste were freed up for the first time in years. In a speech to the Austrian Reichsrat in July 1906, Montecuccoli lobbied hard to put these slipways to use by saying, "The best defense of a coast lies certainly in a powerful offensive. But...we could not go on the offensive against the fleet of any great power." In November, Montecuccoli presented both the Austrian Reichsrat and the Diet of Hungary a new naval budget for the construction of three battleships with a displacement of 14,500 tonnes (14,271 long tons). The budgets passed and the Navy soon went to work assigning shipyards in Triest for the construction of the ships.

By the time design work began on the Radetzky class, a number of foreign navies had moved to adopt very heavy secondary battery guns, usually calibers in the range of 8 to 10 in (203 to 254 mm), and this trend influenced the Austro-Hungarian design staff. Ships of these types were sometimes called "semi-dreadnoughts". The first design was armed with four 28 cm (11 in) guns in two twin turrets, four 24 cm (9.4 in) guns in single turrets, and eight 19 cm (7.5 in) guns in casemates. The second design retained the 28 and 24 cm guns as in the first version, though altered the tertiary guns to twelve 10 cm (3.9 in) guns. The third design, representative of the new dreadnought type of battleship that was being contemplated in other navies, featured eight 28 cm guns in four twin turrets, one fore, one aft, and two wing turrets. The heavy secondary guns were dispensed with altogether, and the light-caliber guns were increased to sixteen 10 cm guns. The fourth design was a variation on the third type; the eight 28 cm guns were replaced by six 30.5 cm (12 in) guns, in two twin turrets and two single turrets. The 10 cm guns remained the same. The final design mounted four 30.5 cm guns in two twin turrets, eight 19 cm guns in four wing turrets, and twelve 10 cm guns in casemates. The leader of the design staff, Siegfried Popper, advocated the construction of an "all-big-gun" ship. However, Austro-Hungarian dock facilities at the time limited displacement to 16,000 long tons (16,260 t); the two "dreadnought" type designs were too heavy.

Popper eventually relented, after admitting that the larger dreadnought type design would also warrant the construction of a new floating dry dock, which would significantly increase the cost of the project. The design board selected the fifth design, though during refinement of the design, the secondary guns were increased in caliber from 19 cm to 24 cm. The 30.5 cm gun was chosen because the breech of the new 28 cm was unreliable. The resulting design was the last pre-dreadnought type of battleship built by the Austro-Hungarian navy.

Underwater protection was also emphasized. Between August and November 1906, the Austro-Hungarian navy conducted explosive tests using the 30-year-old ironclad Kaiser Max. The tests were conducted with 10-kilogram (22 lb), in an attempt to investigate blast effects of the standard 100-kilogram (220 lb) naval mine on a 1:10 scale. The tests were generally unsuccessful; as a result, Popper devised a mathematical model to predict the strength the underwater protection system would require to adequately protect the new battleships. The ships were ultimately equipped with an armored double bottom for defense against mines and torpedoes.

== Design ==
=== General characteristics ===
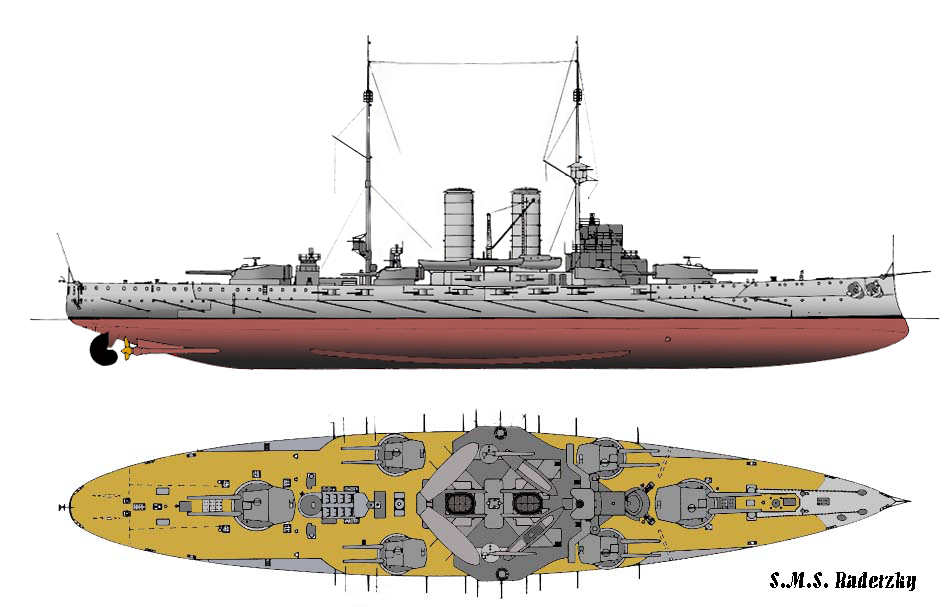
Plan of SMS Radetzky

The Radetzky-class ships were 137.5 m (451 ft 1 in) long at the waterline and 138.8 m (455 ft 5 in) long overall. They had a beam of 24.6 m (80 ft 9 in) and a draft of 8.1 m (26 ft 7 in). The ships were designed to displace 14,508 long tons (14,741 t) normally, and up to 15,845.5 long tons (16,099.8 t) with a full combat load. Machinery consisted of two four-cylinder vertical triple expansion engines. Each engine was powered by six Yarrow boilers. Power output was 19,800 indicated horsepower (14,800 kW), for a top speed of 20.5 knots (38.0 km/h; 23.6 mph). The ships carried 1,350 long tons (1,370 t) of coal, which enabled a maximum range of 4,000 nmi (7,400 km; 4,600 mi) at a cruising speed of 10 kn (19 km/h; 12 mph).

=== Armament ===
The Radetzky-class ships, as noted above, carried a main battery of four 30.5 cm (12 in) 45-caliber guns in two twin gun turrets. The guns were built by Škoda Works in Pilsen. They were capable of a rate of fire of three shells in the first minute, and then 1 to 2 rounds per minute afterward. The guns fired armor-piercing (AP) shells that weighed 450 kg (990 lb) and required a 138 kg (304 lb) propellant charge. Their muzzle velocity was 800 metres per second (2,600 ft/s). The turrets could depress to −3° and elevate to 20°. At maximum elevation, the guns could hit targets out to 20,000 m (22,000 yd). These turrets suffered from a number of design faults; among them were the overly-large cupolas on top. If a cupola was struck by gunfire, the thin top armor could be peeled back.

The ships carried a heavy secondary battery of eight 24 cm (9.4 in) guns in four twin turrets. The turrets were mounted amidships, two on either side. These guns had nearly half the penetration power of the larger 30.5 cm guns, and approximately 25% shorter range. The secondary armament was augmented by twenty 10 cm L/50 guns in single mounts. These guns fired 26.2 kg (58 lb) shells at a rate of between 8 and 10 rounds per minute. The shells were fired at a muzzle velocity of 880 m/s (2,900 ft/s) and could hit targets out to 11,000 m (12,000 yd). Radetzky and her sisters also carried several smaller caliber guns, including two 66 mm (2.6 in) L/18 landing guns, four 47 mm (1.9 in) L/44 and one 47 mm L/33 quick-firing guns. After refits in 1916–1917, each ship had four Škoda 7 cm K16 anti-aircraft guns installed. Three 45 cm (17.7 in) torpedo tubes were also carried, two on the beams and one in the stern.

=== Armor ===
The ships had an armored belt that was 230 mm (9.1 in) thick in the central portion of the ship, where it protected the ammunition magazines, machinery spaces, and other critical areas of the ship. Forward and to the rear of the main battery barbettes, the belt reduced in thickness to 100 mm (3.9 in). A 54 mm (2.1 in) thick torpedo bulkhead ran the length of the hull to provide a second layer of underwater protection should the main belt be penetrated. The armored deck was 48 mm (1.9 in) thick, and supported by a sloped deck that was also 48 mm thick.

The main battery turrets were heavily armored. Their sides and face were 250 mm (9.8 in) thick, while their roofs were 60 mm (2.4 in) thick. The turrets for the secondary 24 cm guns had slightly less armor, with 200 mm (7.9 in) thick sides and 50 mm (2 in) thick roofs. The casemates that mounted the 10 cm guns were protected with 120 mm (4.7 in) worth of armor plating. The armored conning tower had 250 mm-thick sides and a 100 mm-thick roof.

== Ships ==
| Ship | Namesake | Builder | Laid down | Launched | Completed | Fate |
|---|---|---|---|---|---|---|
| Erzherzog Franz Ferdinand | Archduke Franz Ferdinand of Austria | Stabilimento Tecnico Triestino, Trieste | 12 September 1907 | 30 September 1908 | 5 June 1910 | Transferred to Italy, September 1919 |
| Radetzky | Field marshal Joseph Radetzky von Radetz | Stabilimento Tecnico Triestino, Trieste | 26 November 1907 | 3 July 1909 | 15 January 1911 | Transferred to Italy, September 1919 |
| Zrínyi | Zrínyi család | Stabilimento Tecnico Triestino, Trieste | 20 January 1909 | 12 April 1910 | 15 September 1911 | Transferred to Italy, September 1919 |

== Service careers ==
=== Pre-war ===
The three Radetzky-class battleships were assigned to the 2nd Division of the 1st Battle Squadron, alongside the Tegetthoff ships in the 1st Division. The three ships conducted several training cruises in the Mediterranean Sea after their commissioning in 1910–1911. Radetzky was present during the British Coronation Review at Spithead in 1911. In 1912, Zrínyi took part in a training cruise with the recently commissioned dreadnoughts Tegetthoff and Viribus Unitis in the eastern Mediterranean, which included a stop at Malta. The following year, the three ships were involved in an international naval demonstration to protest the raging Balkan Wars;during the operation the first seaplanes to be launched from a warship in combat were operated from Radetzky and her sisters.

=== World War I ===
The assistance of the Austro-Hungarian fleet was called upon by the German Mediterranean Division, which consisted of the battlecruiser SMS Goeben and light cruiser SMS Breslau. The German ships were attempting to break out of Messina, where they had been coaling prior to the outbreak of war—British ships had begun to assemble off Messina in an attempt to trap the Germans. By this time, the Austro-Hungarians had not yet fully mobilized their fleet, though the three Radetzkys and three Tegetthoffs, along with several cruisers and smaller craft, were available. The Austro-Hungarian high command, wary of instigating war with Great Britain, ordered the fleet to avoid the British ships, and to only openly support the Germans while they were in Austro-Hungarian waters. On 7 August, when the Germans broke out of Messina, the Austro-Hungarian fleet, including the Radetzky-class battleships, sailed as far south as Brindisi, before returning to port.

In October 1914, the French army established artillery batteries on Mount Lovčen to support the Army of Montenegro against the Austrian army at Cattaro. By the time they were operational, on 15 October, the Austro-Hungarians were ready with the pre-dreadnoughts of the Habsburg class. However, their 24 cm guns were insufficient to dislodge the French artillery batteries, and so Radetzky was sent to assist them. On 21 October, the ship arrived, and the gunfire from her 30.5 cm guns forced the French to abandon the position. On 24 May 1915, all three ships bombarded the Italian coast, including the important naval base at Ancona, following the entrance of Italy into the war on the side of the Triple Entente.

By October 1918, Austria prepared to transfer her entire fleet to the State of Slovenes, Croats and Serbs in order to keep it out of Italian hands. On 10 November 1918, one day before the armistice, Yugoslav officers with scratch crews sailed Radetzky and Zrínyi out of Pola. As they cleared the breakwater at Pola, they sighted the approaching Italian fleet. The two battleships hoisted American flags and sailed south along the Adriatic coast to Castelli Bay near Spalato. They appealed for American naval forces to meet them and accept their surrender, which a squadron of USN submarine chasers in the area did. However, under the subsequent peace treaty, the Allied powers ignored the transfer of the Austro-Hungarian ships to the Yugoslav navy; instead, the ships were to be ceded to Italy. Radetzky and Zrínyi were broken up in Italy between 1920 and 1921; Erzherzog Franz Ferdinand survived until 1926, when she too was scrapped in Italy.
