= SMS Radetzky (1909) =

Austro-Hungarian Radetzky-class battleship

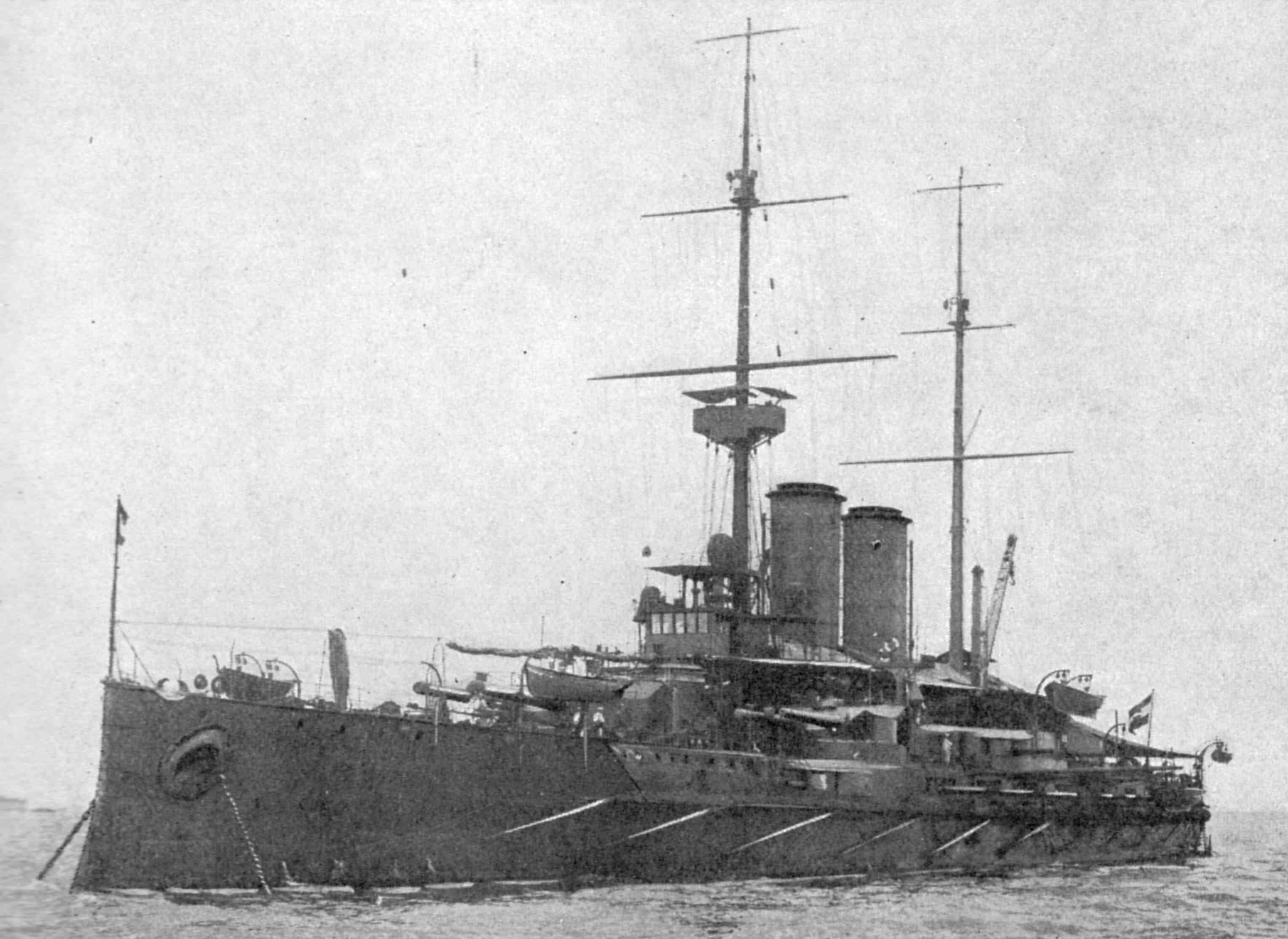
- SMS Radetzky

History

Austria-Hungary
- Name: SMS Radetzky
- Namesake: Joseph Radetzky von Radetz
- Builder: Stabilimento Tecnico Triestino
- Laid down: 26 November 1907
- Launched: 3 July 1909
- Commissioned: 15 January 1911

United States
- Name: USS Radetzky
- Fate: Turned over to Italy, ultimately scrapped from 1920 to 1921

General characteristics
- Class & type: Radetzky-class battleship
- Displacement: 14,500 long tons (14,700 t)
- Length: 139 m (456 ft)
- Beam: 25 m (82 ft)
- Draught: 8.1 m (26 ft 7 in)
- Propulsion: 2 shaft vertical triple expansion steam engines; 12 Yarrow-type coal-fired boilers; 20,000 hp
- Speed: 20 knots (23 mph; 37 km/h)
- Range: 4,000 nmi (7,400 km) at 10 kn (12 mph; 19 km/h); 1,350 tons coal
- Complement: 880–890 officers and men
- Armament: 4 × 30.5 cm (12.0 in) guns; 8 × 24 cm (9.4 in) guns; 20 × 10 cm (3.9 in) K10 rapid-fire cannons; 4 × 7 cm (2.8 in) anti-aircraft guns; 2 × 66 mm (2.6 in) L/18 landing guns; 4 × 47 mm (1.9 in) guns; 3 × 45 cm (18 in) torpedo tubes
- Armor: Belt: 230 mm (9.1 in); Deck: 48 mm (1.9 in); Bulkhead: 54 mm (2.1 in); Main turrets: 250 mm (9.8 in); Secondary turrets: 200 mm (7.9 in); Casemates: 120 mm (4.7 in); Conning tower: 250 mm (9.8 in)

SMS Radetzky (Note: "SMS" stands for "Seiner Majestät Schiff ", or "His Majesty's Ship" in German.) was the first of the three Radetzky-class pre-dreadnought battleships built for the Austro-Hungarian Navy (K.u.K. Kriegsmarine). She was named for the 19th-century Austrian field marshal Joseph Radetzky von Radetz. Radetzky and her sisters, Erzherzog Franz Ferdinand and Zrínyi, were the last pre-dreadnoughts built by the Austro-Hungarian Navy—they were followed by the larger and significantly more powerful Tegetthoff-class dreadnoughts. (Note: Although SMS Radetzky was laid down and commissioned after the launching of HMS Dreadnought in 1906, her design was begun before, and she had the characteristics of a pre-dreadnought battleship, rather than the later post-dreadnoughts.)

Radetzky was built by the shipbuilding company Stabilimento Tecnico in Trieste and commissioned into the fleet on 15 January 1911. The ship conducted training cruises in the Mediterranean before the outbreak of World War I in mid-1914. During the war, Radetzky operated largely as part of a fleet in being alongside the rest of the Austro-Hungarian Navy; in doing so, the ships tied down considerable naval forces from the Triple Entente. Radetzky did participate in some offensive operations, primarily shore bombardments in the Adriatic Sea against French, Montenegrin, and Italian targets.

Towards the end of 1918, with the war going against the Austrians, Radetzky was prepared to be transferred to the State of Slovenes, Croats and Serbs. On 10 November 1918 — six days after the Austrian armistice — Yugoslav navy officers sailed the battleship out of Pola and surrendered it to a squadron of American submarine chasers. Under the terms of the Treaty of Saint-Germain-en-Laye, the transfer was not recognized; instead, Radetzky was given to Italy and broken up for scrap.

== Construction ==
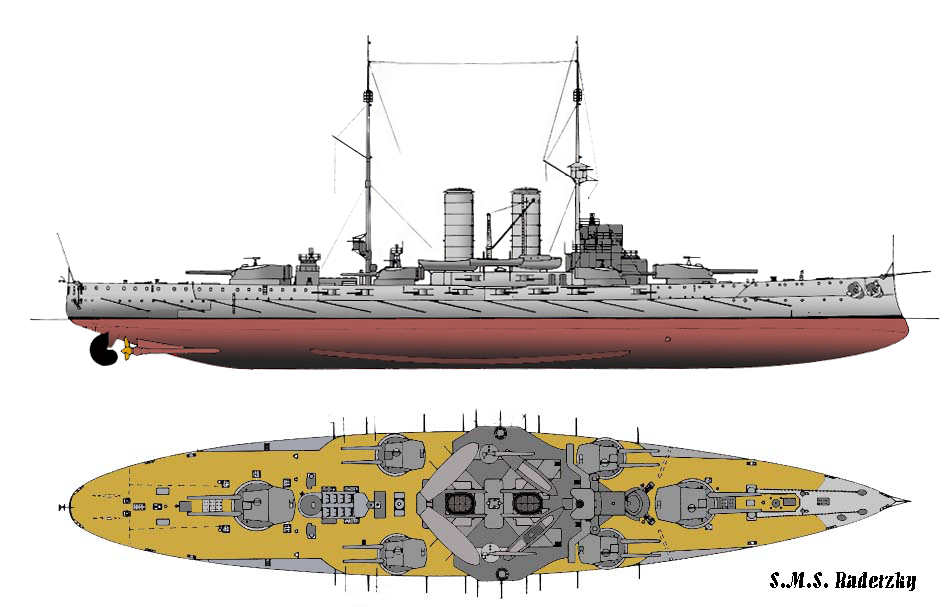
Plan of SMS Radetzky.

Radetzky was built at the Stabilimento Tecnico Triestino dockyard in Trieste, the same place where her sister ships were built. She was the second ship of her class to be constructed and her keel was laid on 26 November 1907. The teak wood used on Radetzky's deck was the only material Austria-Hungary had to purchase abroad to build the ship. Radetzky was launched from the slipway on 3 July 1909, and commissioned into the Austro-Hungarian navy on 15 January 1911, with a crew of 880 to 890 officers and men.

Radetzky was 138.8 m (455 ft 4 in) long, and had a beam of 24.6 m (80 ft 8 in) and a draft of 8.1 m (26 ft 9 in). She displaced 14,508 long tons (14,741 t) normally, and up to 15,845.5 long tons (16,099.8 t) with a full combat load. The ship was powered by two-shaft four-cylinder vertical triple expansion engines rated at 19,800 indicated horsepower and a top speed of 20.5 knots (38.0 km/h; 23.6 mph). She had a maximum range of 4,000 nmi (7,400 km; 4,600 mi) at a cruising speed of 10 kn (19 km/h; 12 mph).

The ship's primary armament consisted of four 30.5 cm (12 in) 45-caliber guns in two twin gun turrets. This was augmented by a heavy secondary battery of eight 24 cm (9.4 in) guns in four wing turrets. The tertiary battery consisted of twenty 10 cm L/50 guns in casemated single mounts, two 66 mm (2.6 in) L/18 landing guns, four 47 mm (1.9 in) L/44 and one 47 mm L/33 quick-firing guns. After 1916-17 refits four Škoda 7 cm K16 anti-aircraft guns were installed. Three 45 cm (17.7 in) torpedo tubes were also carried, two on the beams and one in the stern.

== Service history ==
=== Pre-war ===
One of Radetzky's first duties was to attend the British Coronation Review for King George V in Spithead in June 1911. Following her return to the Austro-Hungarian fleet, she conducted several training cruises in the eastern Mediterranean with her two sisters in 1912. Later that year, Radetzky and her sisters, under the command of Vice Admiral Maximilian Njegovan, took part in an international fleet demonstration in the Ionian Sea to protest the Balkan Wars. Among the ships from other navies were the British pre-dreadnought HMS King Edward VII, the Italian pre-dreadnought Ammiraglio di Saint Bon, the French armored cruiser Edgar Quinet, and the German light cruiser SMS Breslau. The combined flotilla, under the command of British Admiral Cecil Burney, proceeded to blockade the Montenegrin coast to prevent Serbian reinforcements from supporting the siege at Scutari.

During the operation, the first seaplanes to be used in combat were operated from Radetzky and her two sisters. This proved unsatisfactory, however, because the ships lacked cranes with which to lift the planes onto the deck, as well as the fact that the deck was too small to accommodate the aircraft. As a result of the pressure from the international blockade, Serbia withdrew its army from Scutari, which was then occupied by a joint Allied ground force. By 1913, the new dreadnoughts of the Tegetthoff class were coming into active service, and so Radetzky and her sisters were shifted from the 1st Division to the 2nd Division of the 1st Battle Squadron.

=== World War I ===
At the outbreak of World War I in August 1914, the German battlecruiser Goeben and light cruiser Breslau were coaling in Messina; British warships had begun to assemble outside the port in an attempt to trap the German ships. The German navy called upon its Austro-Hungarian allies to come to their aid; the Austro-Hungarian high command was initially hesitant, as they wished to avoid initiating hostilities with the British. However, when the Germans made clear they wanted the Austro-Hungarian fleet to steam only as far as Brindisi, the high command relented and sent the portion of the fleet that had by that time been mobilized, which included Radetzky, on the operation. The fleet sailed to the designated latitude, under strict orders to only actively assist the German ships while they were in Austro-Hungarian waters. After the German ships successfully broke out into the Mediterranean, the Austro-Hungarian fleet returned to port.

In October 1914, the French army established artillery batteries on Mount Lovčen to support the Army of Montenegro against the Austrian army at Cattaro. By the time they were operational, on 15 October, the Austro-Hungarians were ready with the pre-dreadnoughts of the Monarch class. However, their 24 cm guns were insufficient to dislodge the French artillery batteries, and so Radetzky was sent to assist them. On 21 October, the ship arrived, and the gunfire from her 30.5 cm guns forced the French to abandon the position.

On 23 May 1915, between two and four hours after the Italian declaration of war reached the main Austro-Hungarian naval base at Pola, (Note: There is some debate on when the fleet departed Pola. Halpern states that it was four hours until the fleet set sail while Sokol claims that the fleet left Pola two hours after the declaration reached Admiral Haus.) Radetzky and the rest of the fleet departed to bombard the Italian and Montenegrin coast. Their focus was on the important naval base at Ancona, and later the coast of Montenegro. The bombardment of Montenegro was part of the larger Austro-Hungarian campaign against the Kingdoms of Montenegro and Serbia, who were members of the Entente, during the first half of 1915. During the attack on Ancona and the surrounding coastline, Radetzky, as well as the cruisers SMS Admiral Spaun and SMS Helgoland, and the destroyers SMS Orjen, SMS Lika Csepel, and SMS Tátra traveled south to cover the ships attacking Ancona. Upon finding no enemy ships in the region, the group bombarded the Termiti Islands, Viests, Manfredonia, and Barletta. After leaving the Gulf of Manfredonia Radetzky and the rest of the ships accompanying her sighted the first enemy ships of the day, two Italian destroyers. During the encounter, one Italian destroyer managed to escape the Austrian ships but the other, Turbine, was severely damaged. Only when a larger Italian force appeared did Radetzky and her accompanying ships abandon their attempts to capture the damaged destroyer.

Aside from the encounter with Turbine, Radetzky managed to destroy a railroad bridge near the town of Fermo, severely hampering the movement of troops and supplies in the region. Sixty-three Italian civilians and military personnel were killed in the bombardment. By the time Italian ships from Taranto and Brindisi arrived on the scene, the Austro-Hungarians were safely back in Pola.

The attack on Ancona was an immense success, and the Austro-Hungarian ships were largely unopposed during the entire operation. The objective of the bombardment was to delay the Italian Army from deploying its forces along the border with Austria-Hungary by destroying critical transportation systems. The surprise attack on Ancona succeeded in delaying the Italian deployment to the Alps for two weeks. This delay gave Austria-Hungary valuable time to strengthen its Italian border and re-deploy some of its troops from the Eastern and Balkan fronts.

Aside from the attack on Ancona, most of the Austro-Hungarian battleships were largely confined to Pola for the duration of the war. Their operations were limited by Admiral Anton Haus, the commander of the Austro-Hungarian Navy, who believed that he would need to husband his ships to counter any Italian attempt to seize the Dalmatian coast. Since coal was diverted to the newer Tegetthoff-class battleships, the remainder of the war saw Radetzky and the rest of the Austro-Hungarian Navy acting as a fleet in being. This resulted in the Allied blockade of the Otranto Strait. With his fleet blockaded in the Adriatic Sea, and facing a shortage of coal, Haus attempted to use mines and submarines, rather than battleships, to reduce the numerical superiority of the Allied navies.

=== End of the war ===
By October 1918, Austria prepared to transfer her entire fleet to the newly created State of Slovenes, Croats and Serbs (later to become the Kingdom of Yugoslavia) in order to keep it out of Italian hands. On 10 November 1918, one day before the Allied Armistice with Germany, and six days after the Austrians and Italians agreed to the Armistice of Villa Giusti, Yugoslav officers with scratch crews sailed Radetzky and Zrínyi out of Pola. Once outside Pola, the ships spotted heavy units of the Italian fleet; the two battleships hoisted American flags and sailed south to escape. A squadron of US Navy submarine chasers operating off the city of Spalato during the allied occupation of the eastern Adriatic accepted the surrender of Radetzky and Zrínyi. However, under the subsequent peace treaty, the Allied powers ignored the transfer of the Austro-Hungarian ships to the Yugoslav navy which had already taken place; instead, the ships were ceded to Italy. Radetzky was broken up in Italy between 1920 and 1921.
