= Škoda 7 cm K10 =

- Type: Dual-purpose gun Coastal artillery
- Place of origin: Austria-Hungary

Service history
- In service: 1912–1945
- Used by: Austria-Hungary; Italy
- Wars: World War I World War II

Production history
- Designer: Škoda
- Designed: 1910
- Manufacturer: Škoda
- Produced: 1912
- Variants: K16 BAG

Specifications
- Mass: 520 kg (1,150 lb)
- Length: 3.5 m (11 ft 6 in) 50 caliber
- Shell weight: 4.5 kg (9.9 lb)
- Caliber: 66 mm (2.6 in)
- Breech: Horizontal sliding breech block
- Elevation: K10: -10° to +20° K16: -6° to +90°
- Traverse: 360°
- Rate of fire: 10-15 rpm
- Muzzle velocity: 880 m/s (2,900 ft/s)
- Maximum firing range: Horizontal: 8 kilometres (5.0 mi) at +20° Vertical: 5 kilometres (16,000 ft)

The Škoda 7 cm K10 was a dual-purpose gun of the Austro-Hungarian Empire that was used by the Austro-Hungarian Navy during World War I. The gun was actually 66 mm, but the classification system for artillery rounded up to the next highest centimeter. The 7 cm K10 was also used by the Italian Navy on ships ceded as war reparations and as coastal artillery during World War II. The Italians referred to it as the 66/47.

== Construction ==
The Škoda 7 cm K10 was developed and built by Škoda at the Pilsen works. The barrel was made of steel with a horizontal sliding breech block and used fixed quick fire ammunition. The Škoda 7 cm K10 was mainly used for anti-torpedo boat defense and the guns had an elevation of -10° to +20°. In 1915 Skoda engineers developed an anti-aircraft mounting for the K10 which was called the Škoda 7 cm K16 BAG (BAG = Ballon-Abwehr Geschutze or anti-balloon gun) which could elevate from -6° to +90° and had the same ballistic performance as the K10.

== History ==
The Škoda 7 cm K10 and K16 were mounted aboard battleships, coastal defence ships and cruisers of the Austro-Hungarian Navy as secondary or tertiary armament. The Italians came into possession of a number of these guns through ships ceded to them as war reparations. The French Navy also came into possession of a number of these guns through ships ceded to them as war reparations, but there is not much evidence that they used them afterwards.

- Tegetthoff class – The 7 cm K10 and K16 were mounted as tertiary armament on these four Dreadnoughts. Each ship had twelve K10 guns on open pivot mounts on the upper deck, above the casemates mainly for anti-torpedo boat defense. There were another three or four (depending on ship) K16 anti-aircraft mounts on top of the 'B' and 'X' turrets after a 1915–16 refit. After World War I the three surviving ships of the Teggethoff class were ceded as war reparations to the allies. SMS Viribus Unitis went to Yugoslavia, SMS Prinz Eugen went to France and SMS Tegetthoff went to Italy. The Tegetthoff was decommissioned in 1923 and scrapped in 1925.
- Radetzky class – The 7 cm K16 was mounted as tertiary armament on these three Semi-dreadnoughts. Each ship had four open pivot mounts for anti-aircraft defense after a 1916–17 refit. After World War I SMS Radetzky, SMS Erzherzog Franz Ferdinand and SMS Zrínyi were ceded to Italy and scrapped between 1920 and 1926.
- Monarch-class coastal defense ships – The 7 cm K16 was mounted as tertiary armament on two of the three ships of this class. SMS Wien and SMS Budapest each had one open pivot mount for anti-aircraft defense after a 1917 refit. SMS Monarch differed from the other two ships in the Monarch-class because it had one of the earlier Škoda 7 cm L/45 BAG guns after a 1917 refit. After World War I the surviving two ships in the class SMS Budapest and SMS Monarch were ceded to Great Britain as war reparations. In 1920 the two ships were sold for scrap to Italy, and were scrapped between 1920 and 1922.
- SMS Sankt Georg – The 7 cm K16 was mounted as tertiary armament on this Armored cruiser. SMS Sankt Georg had one open pivot mount for anti-aircraft defense after a 1916 refit. After World War I SMS Sankt Georg was ceded to the Great Britain as war reparations and sold to an Italian company for scrapping in 1920.
- SMS Admiral Spaun – The 7 cm K16 was mounted as secondary armament on this Scout cruiser. SMS Admiral Spaun had one open pivot mount for anti-aircraft defense after a 1917 refit. After World War I SMS Admiral Spaun was ceded to the Great Britain as war reparations and sold to an Italian company for scrapping in 1920.
- Novara class – The 7 cm K16 was mounted as secondary armament on the three Scout cruisers of the class. Each ship had one open pivot mount for anti-aircraft defense installed after a 1917 refit. After World War I the three ships were ceded as war reparations to the allies. SMS Saida renamed Venzia and SMS Helgoland renamed Brindisi went to Italy and served in the Italian Navy until scrapped in 1937. SMS Novara renamed Thionville went to France and served in the French Navy until scrapped in 1942.
