= Škoda 30.5 cm /45 K10 =

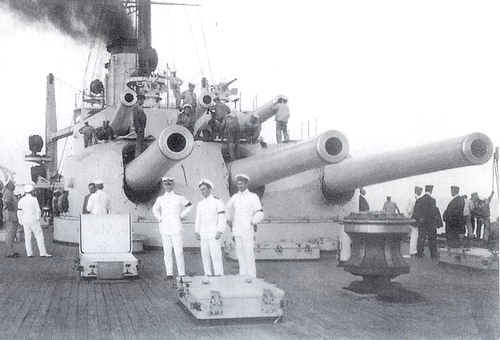
- Stern triple gun turrets aboard the SMS Tegetthoff
- Type: Naval gun Coastal artillery
- Place of origin: Austria-Hungary

Service history
- In service: 1910–1945
- Used by: Austria-Hungary; Kingdom of Italy
- Wars: World War I World War II

Production history
- Designer: Škoda
- Designed: 1908
- Manufacturer: Škoda
- Produced: 1908
- No. built: 65
- Variants: Škoda 30.5 cm

Specifications
- Mass: 54.25 t (60 short tons)
- Length: 13.7 m (45 ft)
- Barrel length: 13 m (43 ft)
- Shell: Separate loading cased charge and projectile
- Shell weight: 450 kg (990 lb)
- Caliber: 30.5 cm (12.0 in) 45 caliber
- Elevation: -4° to +20°
- Traverse: -140° to +140°
- Rate of fire: 3 rpm
- Muzzle velocity: 800 m/s (2,600 ft/s)
- Maximum firing range: 22 km (14 mi) at +20°

The Škoda 30.5 cm /45 and Škoda 30.5 cm /45 K10 were a family of related naval guns of the Austro-Hungarian Empire that were used aboard the last classes of pre-dreadnoughts and dreadnoughts of the Austro-Hungarian Navy during the World War I. Guns salvaged from these ships after World War I were later used by the Royal Italian Army as coastal artillery during World War II.

== History ==
The 30.5 cm /45 was developed and built by Škoda at the Plzeň works beginning in 1908 as the primary armament for the last class of pre-dreadnought battleships produced for the Austro-Hungarian Navy known as the Radetzky-class. The three Radetzky-class ships were armed with one twin gun turret fore and aft. The later Škoda 30.5 cm /45 K10 were the primary armament for the last class of four dreadnought battleships produced for the Austro-Hungarian Navy known as the Tegetthoff-class. The Tegetthoff-class having two superfiring triple gun turrets fore and aft. After World War I the SMS Tegetthoff, SMS Erzherzog Franz Ferdinand, SMS Radetzky and SMS Zrinyi were ceded to Italy as war reparations. The four ships being scrapped in Italy between 1920 and 1926. The guns salvaged by the Italians were known as Cannon 305/42.

== Construction ==
A total of sixty-five guns were built by Škoda. The first thirteen were for the Radetzky-class, while the last fifty-two guns were for the Tegetthoff-class. Only the Tegetthoff-class carried the K10 guns. The K10 differing from the earlier guns by having a 5 cm (2 in) longer firing chamber to accommodate a larger propellant charge. Otherwise weights, dimensions and ballistic performance for the two series of guns were very similar. Both guns used Krupp horizontal sliding breech blocks with separate loading metallic cased charges and projectiles. Unlike other large naval guns of the time which used separate loading bagged charges and ammunition, the 30.5 cm /45 used separate loading ammunition with charges inside of a brass cartridge case to provide obturation.

== Ammunition ==
Ammunition was of separate loading type with a cartridge case which weighed 69.6 kg (153 lb) and a bagged charge which weighed 138–140 kg (304–309 lb).

Austro-Hungarian Ammunition:

- Armor Piercing - Length=104 cm (3 ft 5 in), Weight=450 kg (990 lb)
- Common Pointed- Length=122 cm (4 ft), Weight=450 kg (990 lb)

Italian-Ammunition:

- Armor Piercing - Length=unknown, Weight=452 kg (996 lb)

== Coastal Artillery ==
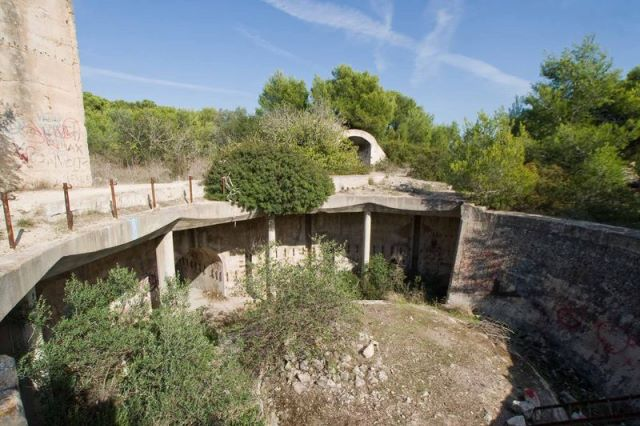
Remains of a 305/42 gun emplacement.

In the years following World War I a number of different destinations for the 305/42 guns were suggested. These included Trapani, Pantelleria, Tobruk, Ischia, Ponza, Leros and Capri. At the outbreak of World War II, only three guns on single mounts slated for Tobruk, were instead used to arm Battery Cattaneo near Taranto. These fortifications were still incomplete at the time of the Italian armistice in 1943. Another two guns were considered for the monitors GM191 and GM192.

305 mm /46 Model 1909 guns from the scrapped Dante Alighieri and the salvaged Leonardo da Vinci were also under consideration, but the 305/42 was considered to be less costly to build installations for. However a limited ammunition supply militated against widespread use of the 305/42.
