= SMS Erzherzog Franz Ferdinand =

Austro-Hungarian battleship

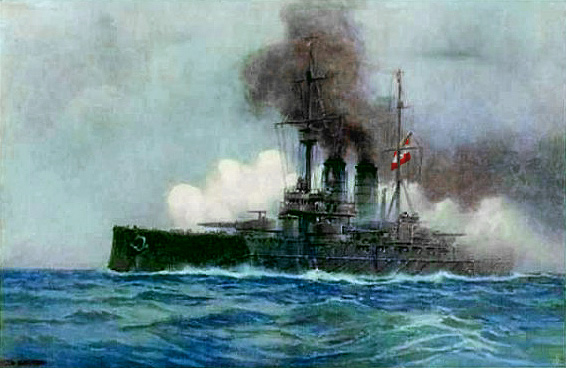
- SMS Erzherzog Franz Ferdinand on gunnery trials in 1908

History

Austria-Hungary
- Name: SMS Erzherzog Franz Ferdinand
- Namesake: Archduke Franz Ferdinand
- Owner: Austro-Hungarian Navy
- Builder: Stabilimento Tecnico Triestino
- Laid down: 12 September 1907
- Launched: 8 September 1908
- Commissioned: 5 June 1910
- Fate: Ceded to Italy

Italy
- Decommissioned: 1926
- Fate: Scrapped 1926

General characteristics
- Class & type: Radetzky-class battleship
- Displacement: 14,508 long tons (14,741 t) standard; 15,845.5 long tons (16,100 t) full load
- Length: 137.5 m (451 ft 1 in)
- Beam: 24.6 m (80 ft 9 in)
- Draft: 8.1 m (26 ft 7 in)
- Installed power: 19,800 ihp (14,765 kW)
- Propulsion: 2 shafts, 2 vertical triple expansion steam engines; 12 Yarrow-type coal-fired boilers
- Speed: 20.5 knots (38.0 km/h; 23.6 mph)
- Range: 4,000 nmi (7,408 km; 4,603 mi) at 10 kn (19 km/h; 12 mph)
- Complement: 890
- Armament: 4 × 30.5 cm (12.0 in) guns; 8 × 24 cm (9.4 in) guns; 20 × 10 cm (3.9 in) K10 rapid-fire cannons; 4 × 7 cm (2.8 in) anti-aircraft guns; 4 × 47 mm (1.9 in) guns; 3 × 45 cm (18 in) torpedo tubes
- Armor: Belt: 230 mm (9.1 in); Deck: 48 mm (1.9 in); Bulkhead: 54 mm (2.1 in); Main turrets: 250 mm (9.8 in); Secondary turrets: 200 mm (7.9 in); Casemates: 120 mm (4.7 in); Conning tower: 250 mm (9.8 in)

SMS Erzherzog Franz Ferdinand (Note: "SMS" stands for "Seiner Majestät Schiff ", or "His Majesty's Ship" in German. "Erzherzog" means "Archduke".) was an Austro-Hungarian Radetzky-class pre-dreadnought battleship commissioned into the Austro-Hungarian Navy on 5 June 1910. (Note: Although SMS Erzherzog Franz Ferdinand was laid down and commissioned after the launching of HMS Dreadnought in 1906, her design was begun before and had the characteristics of a Pre-Dreadnought battleship rather than later Post-Dreadnought battleships.) She was named after Archduke Franz Ferdinand. The first ship of her class to be built, she preceded Radetzky by more than six months. Her armament included four 30.5 cm (12 in) guns in two twin turrets, and eight 24 cm (9.4 in) guns in four twin turrets.

She participated in an international naval protest of the Balkan Wars in 1913, during which she helped enforce a blockade of Montenegro. She was also one of the first ships to deploy seaplanes for military use. During World War I, she saw limited service in the 2nd Division of the 1st Battle Squadron, including mobilization to assist the escape of the German ships SMS Goeben and SMS Breslau and the bombardment of Ancona in 1915. At the end of the war, she was ceded to Italy as a war prize and was eventually scrapped in 1926.

== Construction ==
Erzherzog Franz Ferdinand was built at the Stabilimento Tecnico Triestino dockyard in Trieste. She was laid down on 12 September 1907 and launched from the slipway on 8 September 1908. The teak used on her deck was the only material Austria-Hungary purchased abroad to build her. A month and a half after her launch, she was towed to the harbor in Muggia for completion. During a severe storm that night, she broke loose from her moorings; with no crewmen aboard, Erzherzog Franz Ferdinand drifted for several hours before running aground just off Izola. The following morning, the navy located her and started to refloat her. Completion was delayed by a welders' strike in 1908 and a riveters' strike in 1909. Erzherzog Franz Ferdinand was the first ship of the class to be completed, and she was commissioned into the Austro-Hungarian Navy on 5 June 1910.

At 137.5 m (451 ft 1 in) long, with a beam of 24.6 m (80 ft 9 in) and a draft of 8.1 m (26 ft 7 in), Erzherzog Franz Ferdinand normally displaced 14,508 long tons (14,741 t). With full combat load, she displaced up to 15,845.5 long tons (16,100 t). Erzherzog Franz Ferdinand, like the other ships of the Radetzky class, was smaller and not as well-armed as other battleships in contemporary navies. Despite these shortcomings, Erzherzog Franz Ferdinand was one of Austria-Hungary's first true deep-water fighting ships. She was powered by two 4-cylinder vertical triple expansion steam engines rated at 19,800 indicated horsepower and had a maximum speed of 20.5 knots (38.0 km/h; 23.6 mph). Erzherzog Franz Ferdinand was the first warship in the Austro-Hungarian Navy to use oil and coal-fired boilers. She had a maximum range of 4,000 nautical miles (7,408 km; 4,603 mi) at a cruising speed of 10 kn (19 km/h; 12 mph).

The ship's primary armament consisted of four 30.5 cm (12 in) 45-caliber guns in two twin gun turrets. Eight 24 cm (9.4 in) guns in four wing turrets formed the heavy secondary battery. The tertiary battery consisted of twenty 10 cm (3.9 in) L/50 guns in casemated single mounts and four 47 mm (1.9 in) L/44 guns. After 1916–17 refits four Škoda 7 cm K16 anti-aircraft guns were installed. Three 45 cm (17.7 in) torpedo tubes were also carried, two on the beam and one in the stern.

== Service history ==
The ship was assigned to the Austro-Hungarian fleet's 1st Battle Squadron after her 1910 commissioning. In 1912, Erzherzog Franz Ferdinand and her two sister ships conducted two training cruises into the eastern Mediterranean Sea. On the second cruise into the Aegean Sea, conducted from November to December, she was accompanied by the cruiser Admiral Spaun and a pair of destroyers. After returning to Pola, the entire fleet mobilized for possible hostilities, as tensions flared in the Balkans.

The following year, she participated in an international naval demonstration in the Ionian Sea to protest the Balkan Wars. Ships from other navies included the British pre-dreadnought HMS King Edward VII, the Italian pre-dreadnought Ammiraglio di Saint Bon, the French armoured cruiser Edgar Quinet, and the German light cruiser SMS Breslau. The most important action of the combined flotilla, which was under the command of British Admiral Cecil Burney, was to blockade the Montenegrin coast. The goal of the blockade was to prevent Serbian reinforcements from supporting the siege at Scutari, where Montenegro had besieged a combined force of Albanians and Ottomans. Pressured by the international blockade, Serbia withdrew its army from Scutari, which was subsequently occupied by a joint Allied ground force.

The first seaplanes used in combat, supplied by French manufacturer Donnet-Lévêque, were operated from Erzherzog Franz Ferdinand and her two sisters during the blockade. However, the Austro-Hungarian Navy was not satisfied with the operation, as the ships lacked enough deck space for the planes, as well as a lack of cranes with which they could easily hoist the planes onto the decks. The planes were later moved to a hangar at the navy yard in Teodo. By 1913, the four new dreadnoughts of the Tegetthoff class—the only dreadnoughts built for the fleet—were coming into active service. With the commissioning of these dreadnoughts, the navy shifted Erzherzog Franz Ferdinand and her sisters to the 2nd Division of the 1st Battle Squadron.

=== World War I ===
The ship was named after Archduke Franz Ferdinand, whose assassination on 28 June 1914 triggered World War I. At that time, the battleships in the Austro-Hungarian Navy consisted of the Radetzky class, the Tegetthoff class, and the older Habsburg and Erzherzog Karl classes. Along with the remainder of the Austro-Hungarian Navy, Erzherzog Franz Ferdinand was mobilized in late July 1914 to support the flight of SMS Goeben and Breslau. The two German ships broke out of Messina, which was surrounded by the British navy, and reached their allies in Turkey. The flotilla had advanced as far south as Brindisi in southeastern Italy when news of the successful breakout reached Vienna. The Austro-Hungarian ships were recalled before seeing action.

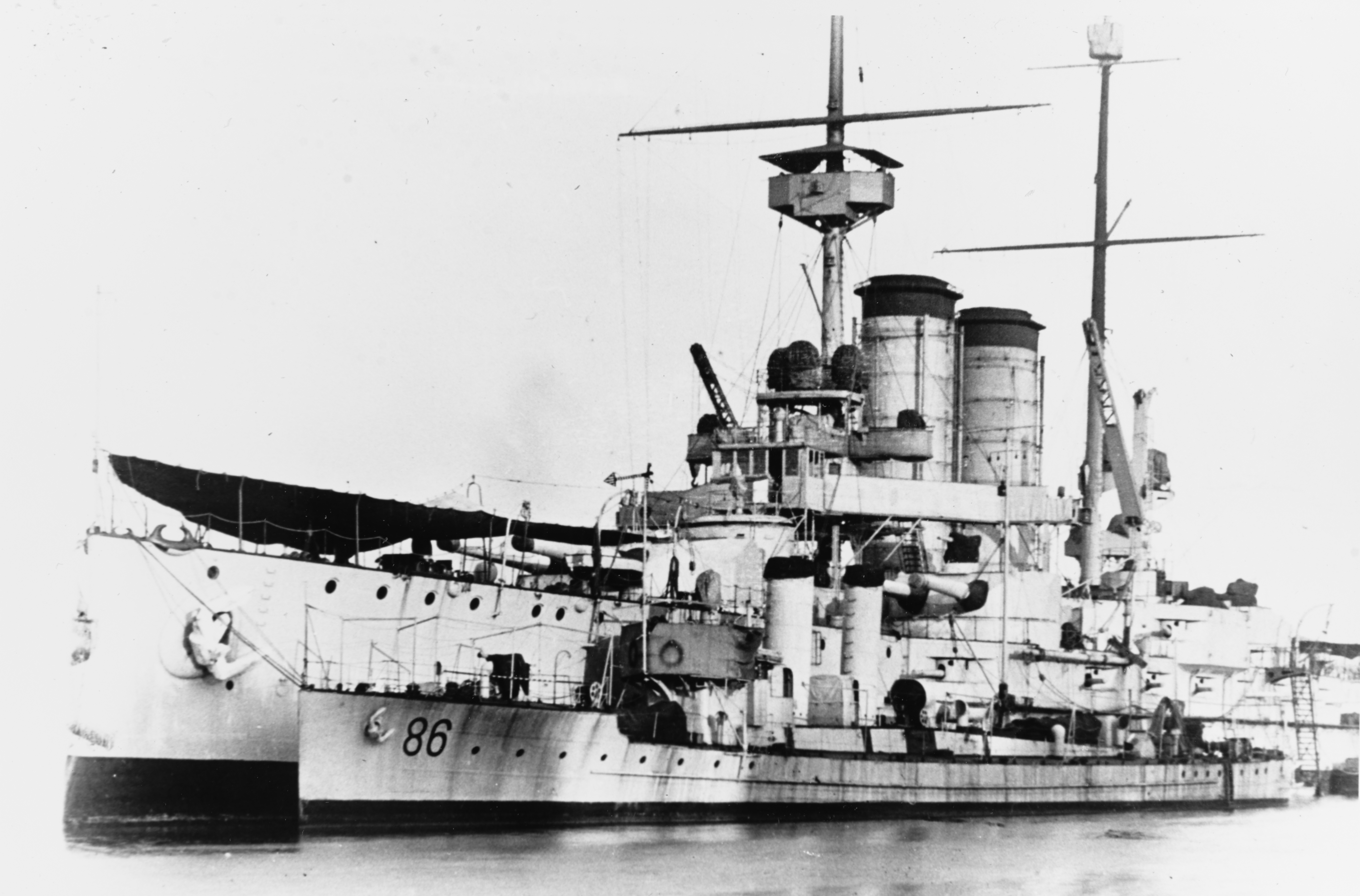
Looming over a 250t-class torpedo boat

On 23 May 1915, between two and four hours after the Italian declaration of war reached the main Austro-Hungarian naval base at Pola, (Note: There is some debate on when the fleet departed Pola. Halpern states that it was four hours until the fleet set sail while Sokol claims that the fleet left Pola two hours after the declaration reached Admiral Haus.) Erzherzog Franz Ferdinand and the rest of the fleet departed to bombard the Italian coast. Their focus was on the important naval base at Ancona, and later the coast of Montenegro. The bombardment of Montenegro was part of the larger Austro-Hungarian campaign against the Kingdoms of Montenegro and Serbia, who were members of the Entente, during the first half of 1915. The attack on Ancona was an immense success, and the ships were unopposed during the operation. The bombardment of the province and the surrounding area resulted in the destruction of an Italian steamer in the port of Ancona itself, and an Italian destroyer, Turbine was severely damaged further south. On the shore, the infrastructure of the port of Ancona, as well as the surrounding towns, were severely damaged. The railroad yard in Ancona, as well as the port facilities in the town, were damaged or destroyed. The local shore batteries were also rendered inactive. Additional targets that were damaged or destroyed included wharves, warehouses, oil tanks, radio stations, and the local barracks. 63 Italians, both civilians and military personnel alike, were killed in the bombardment. By the time Italian ships from Taranto and Brindisi arrived at Ancona, the Austro-Hungarians were safely back in Pola.

The objective of the bombardment of Ancona was to delay the Italian Army from deploying its forces along the border with Austria-Hungary by destroying critical transportation systems. The surprise attack on Ancona succeeded in delaying the Italian deployment to the Alps for two weeks. This delay gave Austria-Hungary valuable time to strengthen its Italian border and re-deploy some of its troops from the Eastern and Balkan fronts.

The only damage in the ensuing days to Erzherzog Franz Ferdinand appears to have been after the battleships returned to Pola. A collision occurred between the ship and an unknown Austro-Hungarian destroyer on 30 May, while both were attempting to avoid an aerial bombardment from an Italian airship; the destroyer sank. (Note: While the New York Times stated that the unnamed ship was a destroyer, there are no other records of an Austro-Hungarian destroyer being sunk in May 1915.)

Aside from the attack on Ancona, the Austro-Hungarian battleships were confined to Pola for the duration of the war. Their operations were limited by Admiral Anton Haus, the commander of the Austro-Hungarian Navy, who believed that he would need to husband his ships to counter any Italian attempt to seize the Dalmatian coast. Since coal was diverted to the newer Tegetthoff-class battleships, the remainder of the war saw Erzherzog Franz Ferdinand and the rest of the Austro-Hungarian Navy acting as a fleet in being. This resulted in the Allied blockade of the Otranto Strait. With his fleet blockaded in the Adriatic Sea, and with a shortage of coal, Haus enacted a strategy based on mines and submarines designed to reduce the numerical superiority of the Allied navies.

=== Postwar fate ===
According to the terms of the Armistice of Villa Giusti, which ended hostilities between Italy and Austro-Hungary, the latter was to transfer three battleships to Venice. Italy originally intended to seize the three remaining Tegetthoff-class ships, but Italian frogmen sank SMS Viribus Unitis three days before the Armistice took effect. Erzherzog Franz Ferdinand was substituted in her place. The pre-dreadnought served as a showpiece of the Italian victory parade held in March 1919. (Note: Koburger, p. 121.) She was formally ceded to Italy under the terms of the Treaty of Saint-Germain-en-Laye, signed in September 1919, and was moved to Venice by sailors of the Regia Marina (Royal Italian Navy). Erzherzog Franz Ferdinand saw no further action while in Italian custody; she was scrapped in 1926.
