= List of ironclad warships of Austria-Hungary =

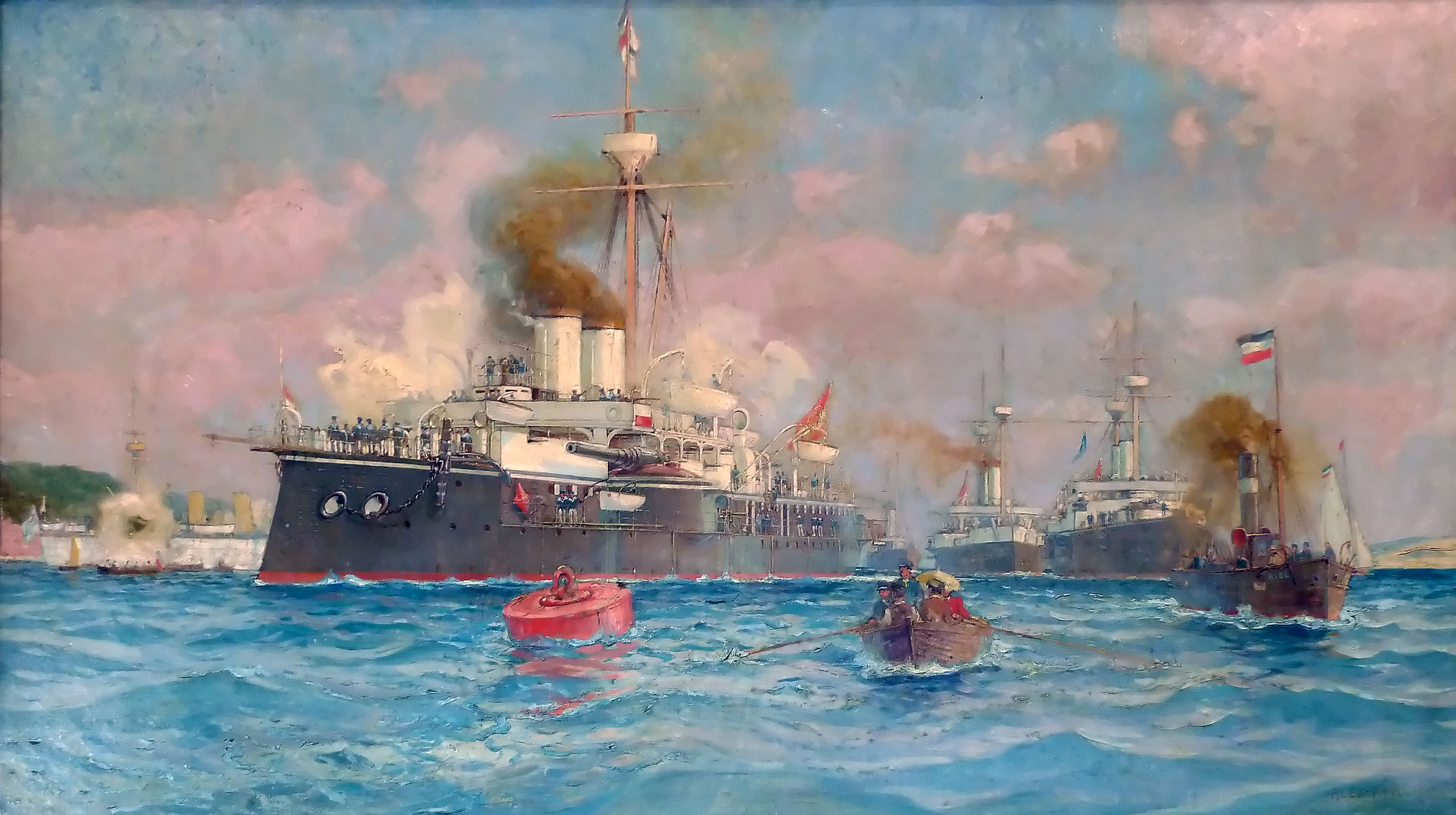
An 1890 painting of an Austro-Hungarian squadron in Kiel, Germany, led by Kronprinz Erzherzog Rudolf

Between the 1860s and the 1880s, the Austro-Hungarian Navy acquired a fleet of seventeen ironclad warships, including broadside ironclads, central battery ships and barbette ships. The first generation of ships, the seven broadside ironclads of the Drache, Kaiser Max and Erzherzog Ferdinand Max classes, formed the core of the Austrian fleet that was involved in an ironclad arms race with Italy in the 1860s and defeated the Italian Regia Marina (Royal Navy) at the Battle of Lissa in July 1866. The Austrian commander, Wilhelm von Tegetthoff, used ramming tactics to win the battle, which influenced the second generation of ironclads that he ordered in the late 1860s and early 1870s. These ships—Lissa, Custoza, Erzherzog Albrecht and the rebuilt ship of the line Kaiser—were central battery ships; this placed an emphasis on end-on fire capabilities, a necessity for ramming attacks since broadside guns could not be brought to bear when ramming.

Following Tegetthoff's death in 1871, Friedrich von Pöck succeeded him as the head of the Austro-Hungarian Navy; Pöck lacked Tegetthoff's prestige and had great difficulty in securing funds from the Austro-Hungarian parliament for new ironclads. Pöck resorted to subterfuge to build the three Kaiser Max-class ironclads in the mid-1870s, ostensibly as simple reconstructions of the earlier vessels of the same names but little material was reused in the new ships. Pöck gained parliamentary approval for two new vessels, the center battery ship Tegetthoff in 1876 and the barbette ship Kronprinz Erzherzog Rudolf in 1881. Pöck's successor, Maximilian Daublebsky von Sterneck, used the same ruse to acquire funding for the barbette ship Kronprinzessin Erzherzogin Stephanie, using funds supposedly devoted to rebuilding Erzherzog Ferdinand Max to build the new ship.

None of the second generation of Austro-Hungarian ironclads saw significant activity, owing to meager naval budgets, which precluded much active use throughout the late 19th century. By the early 1900s, the ships still in the navy's inventory had been reduced to secondary duties such as harbor defense or training exercises, with just Kronprinz Erzherzog Rudolf operational, serving as a guard ship. She was the only Austro-Hungarian ironclad in service during World War I, though she saw no action. After the war, most of the ships were surrendered to Italy as war prizes, though Kronprinz Erzherzog Rudolf and Kaiser Max were awarded to the Royal Yugoslav Navy. Most of the surrendered vessels were broken up in the 1920s, though Erzherzog Albrecht, having been converted into a barracks ship, remained in the Italian Navy inventory until 1950.

Key
Armament	The number and type of the primary armament
Armor	The maximum thickness of the belt armor
Displacement	Ship displacement at full combat load
Propulsion	Number of shafts, type of propulsion system, and top speed generated
Service	The dates work began and finished on the ship and its ultimate fate
Laid down	The date the keel assembly commenced
Commissioned	The date the ship was commissioned into the Navy

== Drache class ==
Drache at anchor after her 1867 refit

Beginning with the launch of the French ironclad Gloire in 1859, the major European powers embarked on naval construction programs to modernize their fleets to match the development of the armored frigate. The Austrian Navy, under the direction of Marinekommandant (Naval Commandant) Archduke Ferdinand Max, ordered its first two ships in 1860 in response to Italy's order for the two Formidabile-class ironclads, which marked the beginning of the Austro-Italian ironclad arms race. The Austrian vessels, Drache and Salamander, were designed by Josef von Romako, the chief constructor of the Austrian Navy. Both ships were built by Stabilimento Tecnico Triestino in Trieste. They were small broadside ironclads, armed with a battery of twenty-eight guns. They provided the basis of the subsequent Kaiser Max and Erzherzog Ferdinand Max classes, which formed the core of the Austrian fleet at the Battle of Lissa.

The two ships were kept in Austrian waters to protect against a possible Danish attack during the Second Schleswig War of 1864, though the Danish fleet remained in the North and Baltic Seas for the duration of the conflict. Two years later, during the Seven Weeks' War against Prussia and Italy, Drache and Salamander saw action at the Battle of Lissa under Wilhelm von Tegetthoff, where the Austrian fleet decisively defeated the Italian Regia Marina. During the battle, Drache destroyed the coastal defense ship Palestro. Drache was damaged by heavy Italian fire, but Salamander was not seriously damaged in the battle. The ships saw little use after the war, and by 1875, both were in poor condition. Drache's wooden hull was badly rotted by that time, and so she was removed from service and ultimately broken up in 1883. Salamander served as a guard ship from 1875 to 1883, when she was hulked; she was dismantled in 1896.

Ship	Armament	Armor	Displacement	Propulsion	Service		
Ship	Armament	Armor	Displacement	Propulsion	Laid down	Commissioned	Fate
Drache	10 × 48-pounder smoothbore guns 18 × 24-pounder rifled, muzzle-loading guns	4.5 in (115 mm)	3,110 long tons (3,160 t)	1 shaft, 1 steam engine, 10.5 knots (19.4 km/h; 12.1 mph)	18 February 1861	November 1862	Broken up, 1883
Salamander	10 × 48-pounder smoothbore guns 18 × 24-pounder rifled, muzzle-loading guns	4.5 in (115 mm)	3,110 long tons (3,160 t)	1 shaft, 1 steam engine, 10.5 knots (19.4 km/h; 12.1 mph)	February 1861	May 1862	Broken up, 1896

== Kaiser Max class (1862) ==
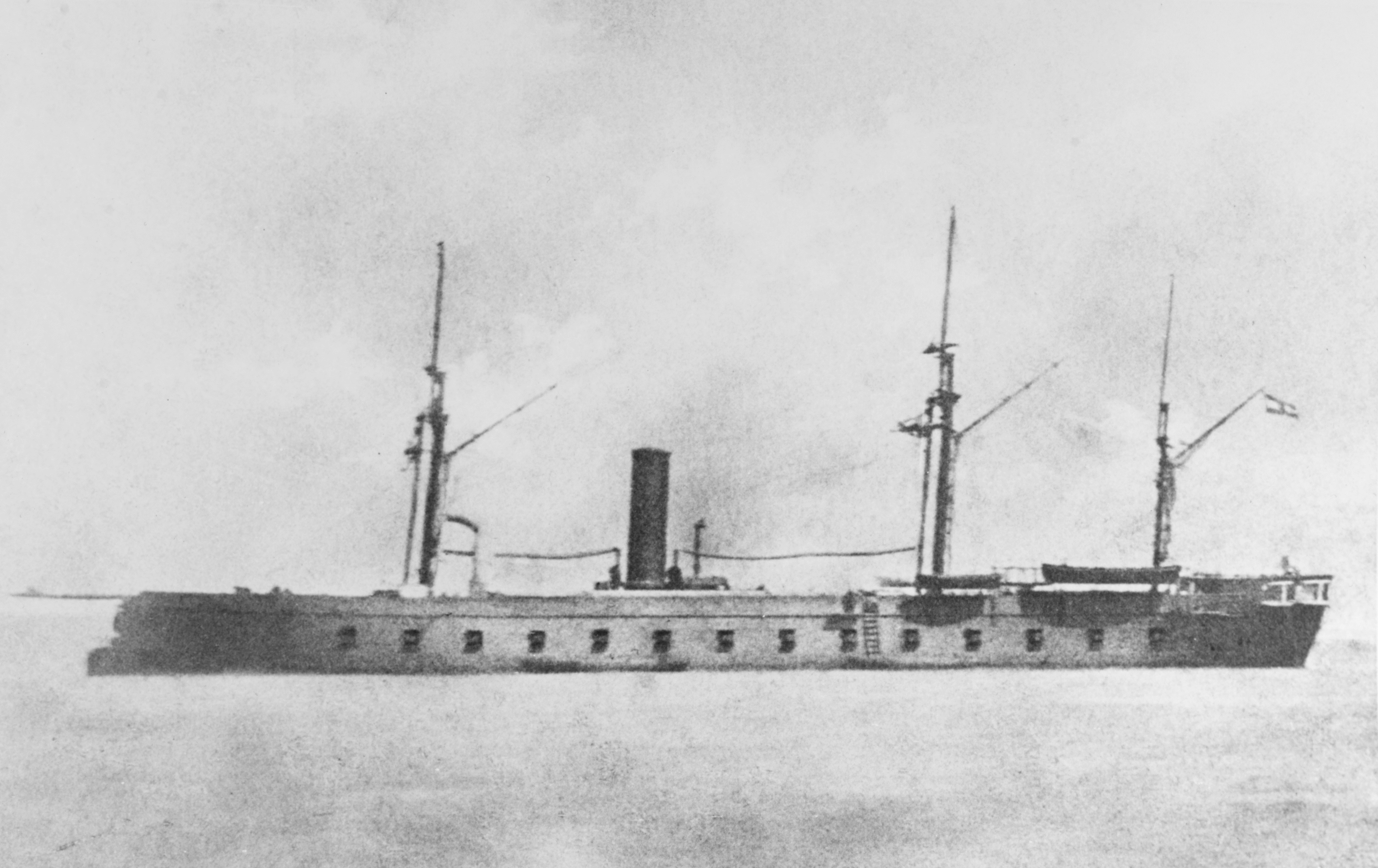
Illustration of Kaiser Max, c. 1866

Austria's main naval rival, the recently united Kingdom of Italy, had also embarked on an ironclad building program in the early 1860s. Italy claimed significant areas of the Austrian Empire as historically Italian, so its naval expansionism posed a direct threat to Austria. To match Italian acquisitions, Archduke Ferdinand Max ordered three more ironclads in 1861; Romako also prepared the design for these ships, which were based on the Draches. The new ships adopted incremental improvements over their predecessors, with more powerful engines (and thus a higher top speed) and more guns. The contracts for the ships were awarded to Stabilimento Tecnico Triestino, which had also built the Drache-class ironclads. They proved to be a flawed design which was very unstable, a deficiency that could not be corrected in a refit conducted in 1867.

Don Juan d'Austria was deployed to the North Sea during the Second Schleswig War, but she arrived too late to take part in any battles with Danish forces. All three ships took part in the Seven Weeks' War and saw action at the Battle of Lissa, with Kaiser Max being among the first ships in Tegetthoff's fleet to spot the Italian Navy. There, they were all heavily engaged in a melee with the Italians, but none were seriously damaged since their armor plating was strong enough to withstand the Italian gunfire. The ships saw little activity after the war, owing in large part to disinterest in naval matters from parliament, which led to cripplingly low budgets for the navy; this prevented the fleet from being used in an active way. As the ships were in unusable condition due to neglect by the early 1870s, Marinekommandant Friedrich von Pöck secured funding to rebuild the vessels, though this was merely a ruse by Pöck to use the funds appropriated for the project to simply build three new vessels with the same names in their place. The original ships were in fact dismantled in 1873, with only the engines, armor plate, and other miscellaneous parts being reused in the new ships.

Ship	Armament	Armor	Displacement	Propulsion	Service		
Ship	Armament	Armor	Displacement	Propulsion	Laid down	Commissioned	Fate
Kaiser Max	16 × 48-pounder guns 15 × 24-pounder guns	4.3 in (110 mm)	3,588 long tons (3,646 t)	1 shaft, 1 steam engine, 11.4 knots (21.1 km/h; 13.1 mph)	Oct 1861	1863	Broken up, 1873
Prinz Eugen	16 × 48-pounder guns 15 × 24-pounder guns	4.3 in (110 mm)	3,588 long tons (3,646 t)	1 shaft, 1 steam engine, 11.4 knots (21.1 km/h; 13.1 mph)	Oct 1861	1863	Broken up, 1873
Don Juan d'Austria	16 × 48-pounder guns 15 × 24-pounder guns	4.3 in (110 mm)	3,588 long tons (3,646 t)	1 shaft, 1 steam engine, 11.4 knots (21.1 km/h; 13.1 mph)	Oct 1861	March 1863	Broken up, 1873

== Erzherzog Ferdinand Max class ==
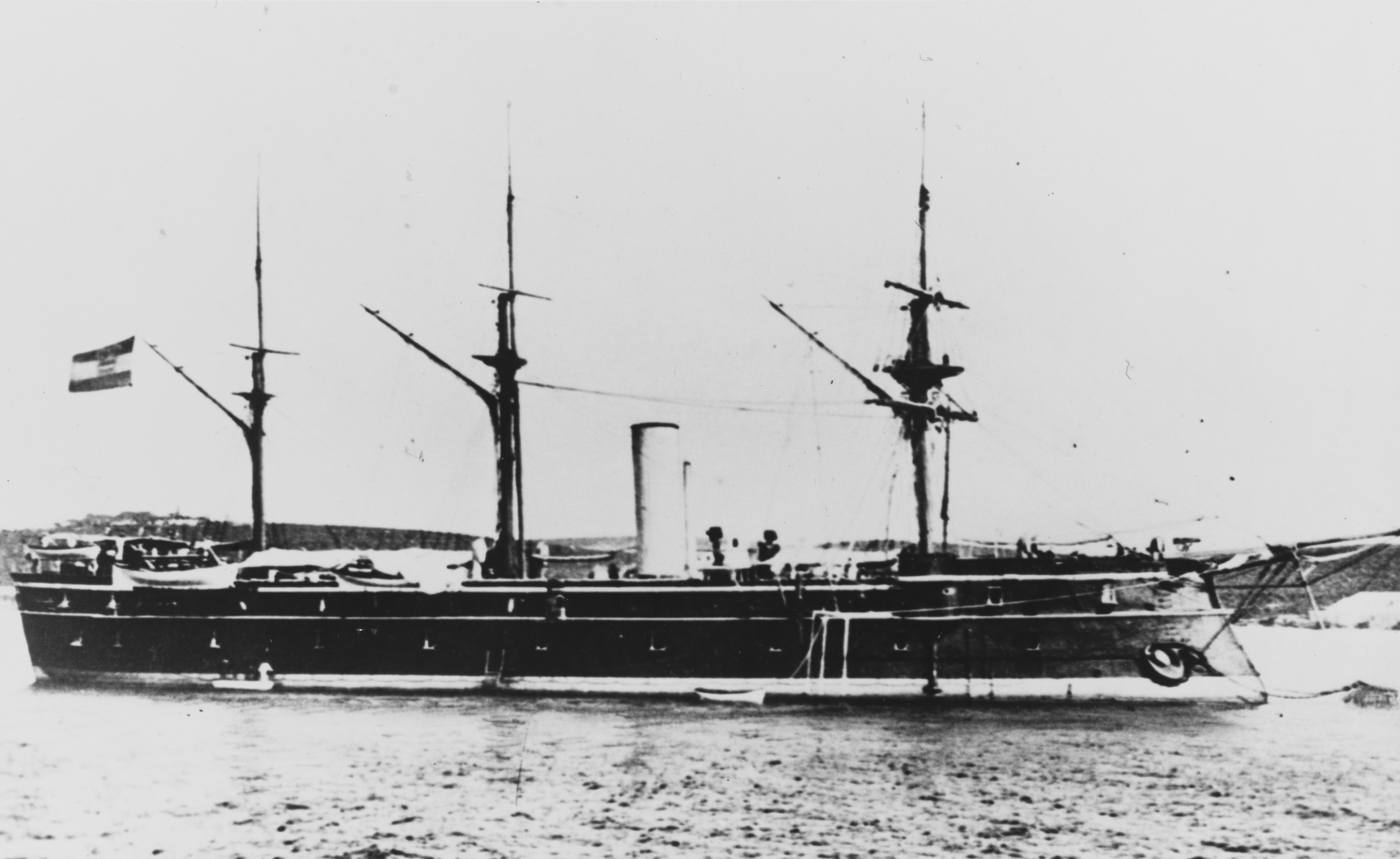
Erzherzog Ferdinand Max sometime after 1880

The last group of the first generation of Austrian ironclads, the Erzherzog Ferdinand Max class, were a significant improvement over the earlier five vessels, being much larger. Their increased size would have allowed them to carry thirty-two 48-pounder guns, a significant increase in fire power over the Kaiser Max class, but the need to complete the ships quickly as tensions with Italy reached a crisis point in June 1866 forced the Stabilimento Tecnico Triestino shipyards in Trieste to complete them with only half that number of guns. With the outbreak of the Seven Weeks' War, the two ships were hastily rushed into service. The ships never received their intended armament, as after the Austrian defeat, disinterest in naval affairs prevented the funding necessary to complete them; instead, they were laid up through the early 1870s. They were finally rearmed in the mid-1870s with 7-inch (178 mm) Armstrong Guns.

Both ships saw action at the Battle of Lissa, with Erzherzog Ferdinand Max serving as Tegetthoff's flagship. He used the ship to ram and sink the Italian ironclad Re d'Italia. Habsburg was less heavily engaged in the battle, though neither ship received significant damage. They spent the rest of the war patrolling the Adriatic Sea, but the Italian fleet remained in port. Tight naval budgets in the two decades after the war precluded much active use. In the mid-1880s, both ships were reduced to secondary duties, with Erzherzog Ferdinand Max becoming a tender to the gunnery training school and Habsburg becoming a guard ship and a barracks ship in Pola, the main Austro-Hungarian naval base. Habsburg was sold for scrap in 1898, but Erzherzog Ferdinand Max remained in the navy's inventory until 1916, when she too was broken up.

Ship	Armament	Armor	Displacement	Propulsion	Service		
Ship	Armament	Armor	Displacement	Propulsion	Laid down	Commissioned	Fate
Erzherzog Ferdinand Max	16 × 48-pounder guns	4.8 in (123 mm)	5,130 long tons (5,210 t)	1 shaft, 1 steam engine, 12.54 knots (23.22 km/h; 14.43 mph)	6 May 1863	July 1866	Broken up, 1916
Habsburg	16 × 48-pounder guns	4.8 in (123 mm)	5,130 long tons (5,210 t)	1 shaft, 1 steam engine, 12.54 knots (23.22 km/h; 14.43 mph)	June 1863	July 1866	Broken up, 1898

== Lissa ==
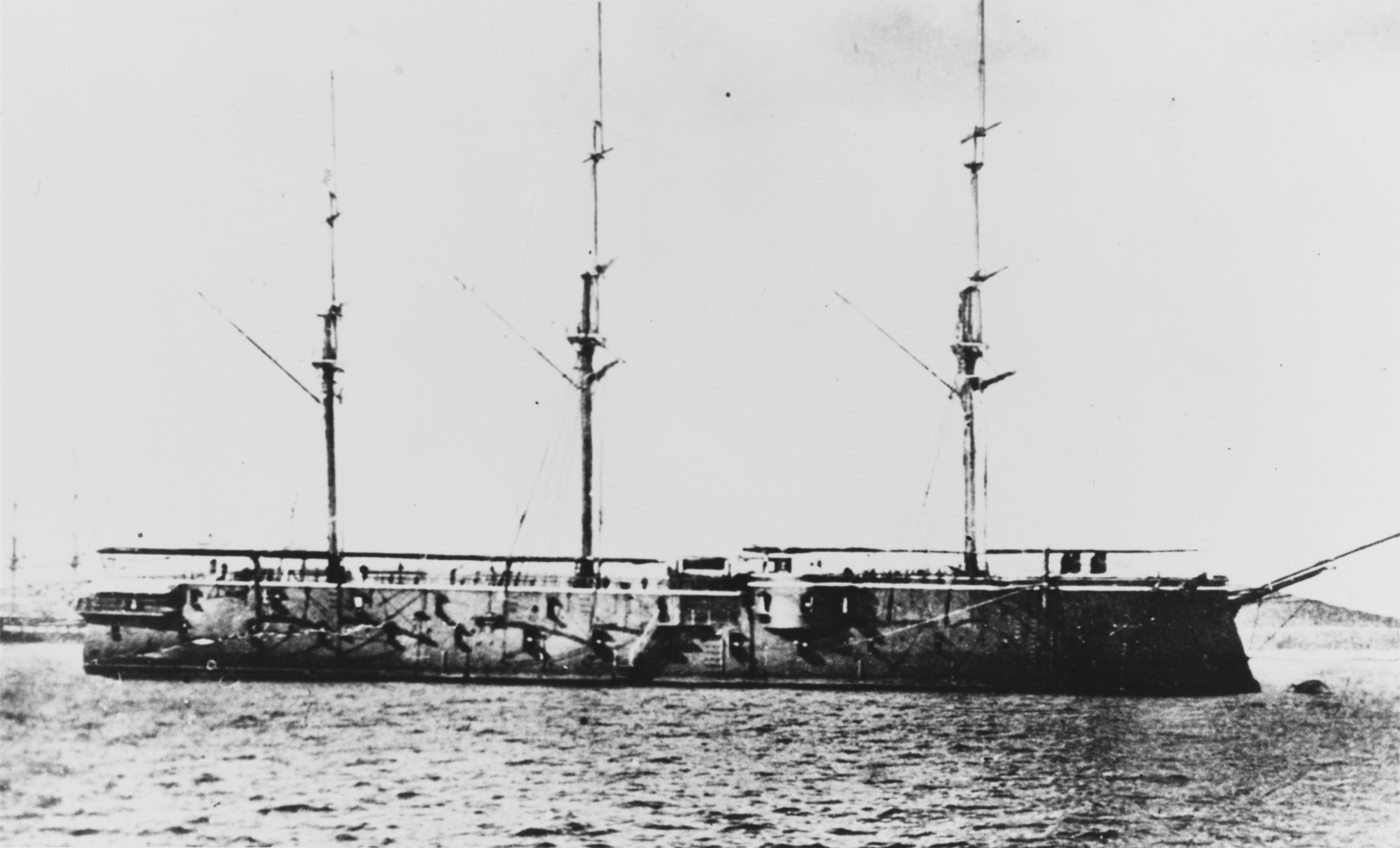
Lissa before 1875

Lissa was the first of the second generation of Austro-Hungarian ironclads; these ships were built after the experience at the Battle of Lissa. At the battle, Tegetthoff had emphasized aggressive ramming tactics to make up for the numerical inferiority of his armored squadron compared to the Italian fleet. These tactics made the traditional broadside arrangement difficult to use, since they could not easily be brought to bear. The recently developed casemate ship solved the problem. This design concentrated the armored gun battery in the central portion of the ship, allowing a thicker but overall lighter scale of armor protection, and permitting angled casemates so the guns could fire ahead and astern. Tegetthoff pressed for a construction program to acquire fifteen ironclads, which would have placed the Austro-Hungarian Navy at parity with its Italian rival. Romako based the design for Lissa on the British HMS Hercules, though unlike Hercules, which mounted her battery in a single deck, Lissa incorporated a second casemate atop the main battery with two of the heavy guns placed there. These guns could be fired ahead, astern, and one to each side. Despite having lost the Seven Weeks' War to Prussia just a year before, the Austro-Hungarian government ordered the ship's breech-loading guns from the Prussian Krupp firm.

Budgetary shortfalls delayed completion of the ship, which was constructed by Stabilimento Tecnico Triestino, thus limiting her career once she entered service. She was laid up in reserve throughout the 1870s, though she was nominally assigned to the ironclad squadron. During this period, the only event of note was a major fire aboard the ship in 1872. In 1880, her hull was found to have rotted badly, so she was drydocked, stripped of most of her armor plate and re-timbered. After completing the reconstruction, she returned to the ironclad squadron, where she served until 1888. Lissa was finally stricken from the register in 1892 and broken up for scrap between 1893 and 1895.

Ship	Armament	Armor	Displacement	Propulsion	Service		
Ship	Armament	Armor	Displacement	Propulsion	Laid down	Commissioned	Fate
Lissa	12 × 9-inch (229 mm) guns	6 in (152 mm)	7,086 long tons (7,200 t)	1 shaft, 1 steam engine, 12.83 knots (23.76 km/h; 14.76 mph)	27 June 1867	May 1871	Broken up, 1893

== Custoza ==
Custoza in port

Custoza was the second ship of Tegetthoff's building program, also designed by Romako and constructed by Stabilimento Tecnico Triestino. He adopted the same basic design as he had used for Lissa, though he incorporated several improvements over the earlier vessel. Custoza carried a heavier battery of eight 10-inch (250 mm) guns, compared to the twelve 9-inch (230 mm) aboard Lissa, and they were placed in a two-story battery with four guns per level; this allowed four guns to fire ahead instead of just two for Lissa. She had an iron hull, the first time the Austro-Hungarian Navy built a major warship of that type. She proved to be fast and maneuverable in service, but was built to an obsolescent design; this was less a fault of Romako's than a simple result of the rapid pace of development of naval technology in the period. By the time Custoza entered service in 1875, Italy had already laid down the two very large and powerful Duilio-class turret ships, which were armed with four 17.7-inch (450 mm) guns. Nevertheless, Custoza, along with the similar and contemporaneously built Erzherzog Albrecht, was the basis for the ironclad Tegetthoff, laid down in 1876.

Like the rest of the Austro-Hungarian ironclad squadron, Custoza spent the 1870s laid up. In 1880, Custoza took part in an international naval demonstration against the Ottoman Empire to force the Ottomans to transfer the city of Ulcinj to Montenegro in accordance with the terms of the 1878 Congress of Berlin. She took part in the opening ceremonies for the Barcelona Universal Exposition in 1888, along with several other Austro-Hungarian vessels; this was the largest squadron of the Austro-Hungarian Navy that had operated outside the Adriatic. The ship served as a training ship from 1902 to 1914, and following the outbreak of World War I in July 1914, she was converted into a barracks ship. Custoza served in that capacity until 1920, when she was ceded to Italy as a war prize and immediately broken up.

Ship	Armament	Armor	Displacement	Propulsion	Service		
Ship	Armament	Armor	Displacement	Propulsion	Laid down	Commissioned	Fate
Custoza	8 × 10-inch (26 cm) guns	9 in (229 mm)	7,730.99 long tons (7,855.05 t)	1 shaft, 1 steam engine, 13.75 knots (25.47 km/h; 15.82 mph)	17 November 1869	February 1875	Broken up, 1920

== Erzherzog Albrecht ==
Illustration of Erzherzog Albrecht with sails

Erzherzog Albrecht was ordered at the same time as Custoza in 1869. Budgetary limitations had however forced Romako to produce a slightly smaller, and thus cheaper, design for the second vessel. Constructed by Stabilimento Tecnico Triestino, Erzherzog Albrecht mounted slightly smaller 9.4-inch (24 cm) Krupp guns in the same arrangement as aboard Custoza; also like Custoza, she had an iron hull, though she had thinner side armor. And as with Custoza, Erzherzog Albrecht was an obsolescent design when she was built. As a result of its chronically low budgets, the navy had trouble paying the British manufacturers of her armor plate on schedule, which delayed her completion.

As with the rest of the Austro-Hungarian fleet, Erzherzog Albrecht spent the 1870s out of service, being activated only in 1881 to assist in the suppression of a rebellion near Cattaro Bay. During the operations, which concluded in March 1882, she and several other ships bombarded rebel positions in the area. She participated in fleet training exercises in 1887 and 1889, but otherwise saw little activity through the 1880s. Erzherzog Albrecht was renamed Feuerspeier and was converted into a tender for the gunnery school in 1908. In 1915, she became a barracks ship for U-boat crews, and after World War I was ceded to Italy as a prize. She was renamed Buttafuoco and used as a storage hulk until 1950, when she was finally scrapped, likely the last extant ironclad of the Austro-Hungarian Navy.

Ship	Armament	Armor	Displacement	Propulsion	Service		
Ship	Armament	Armor	Displacement	Propulsion	Laid down	Commissioned	Fate
Erzherzog Albrecht	8 × 9.4-inch (24 cm) guns	8 in (203 mm)	5,980 long tons (6,080 t)	1 shaft, 1 steam engine, 12.84 knots (23.78 km/h; 14.78 mph)	1 June 1870	June 1874	Ceded to Italy, broken up in 1950

== Kaiser ==
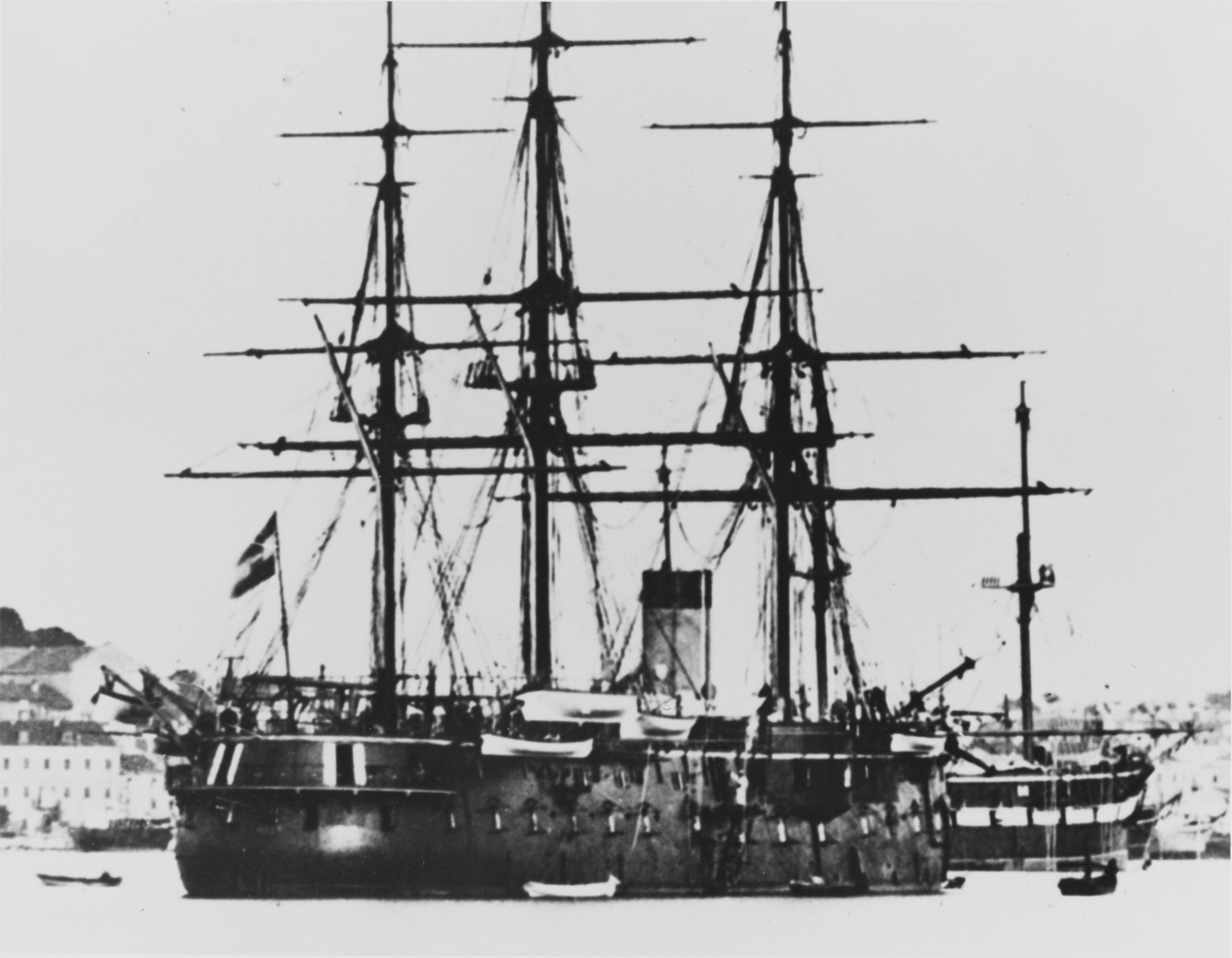
Kaiser after her reconstruction into a casemate ship

Kaiser was originally built as a 100-gun ship of the line in the 1850s, the only ship of that type built for the Austrian fleet. Her design was based on the British 91-gun ship HMS Agamemnon, though with alterations based on the French Algésiras, particularly her larger size and stronger armament. Constructed at the Pola Naval Arsenal, the ship took part in the Battle of Lissa, and was the last ship of her type in the world to be engaged in a naval battle. During the battle, she was heavily engaged in the melee; she battled five Italian ironclads at close range and was badly damaged by Italian gunfire, though she inflicted significant damage on the turret ship Affondatore. As part of Tegetthoff's naval expansion program after the war, he was able to secure funding to modernize Kaiser. She was drydocked in 1869 and heavily rebuilt into an ironclad casemate ship, though unlike the newly built ships in this period that received Krupp breech-loaders, she was rearmed with a battery of ten 9 in (230 mm) 23-pounder muzzle-loading guns manufactured by Armstrong in a central, two-story casemate. These were supported by a secondary battery of six 8-pounder rifled muzzle loaders.

She spent the 1870s out of service, the result of a combination of the chronically low naval budgets and engineers' attempts to improve her very low speed. She received a new propeller in 1876, which increased her speed by more than a knot, and new boilers in 1880; she otherwise remained laid up. The navy determined that the ship was not worth retaining in 1893, and two years later began negotiations to sell her to Venezuela, but the discussions ultimately came to nothing. Instead, she was converted into a barracks ship in 1901–1902 and served in that capacity through World War I under the name Bellona. Italy seized the ship after the war, though her ultimate fate is unknown.

Ship	Armament	Armor	Displacement	Propulsion	Service		
Ship	Armament	Armor	Displacement	Propulsion	Laid down	Commissioned	Fate
Kaiser	10 × 9-inch guns	6 in	5,720 long tons (5,810 t)	1 shaft, 1 steam engine, 11.55 kn (21.39 km/h; 13.29 mph)	2 February 1869 (drydocked for reconstruction)	December 1873 (reconstruction completed)	Ceded to Italy, fate unknown

== Kaiser Max class (1875) ==
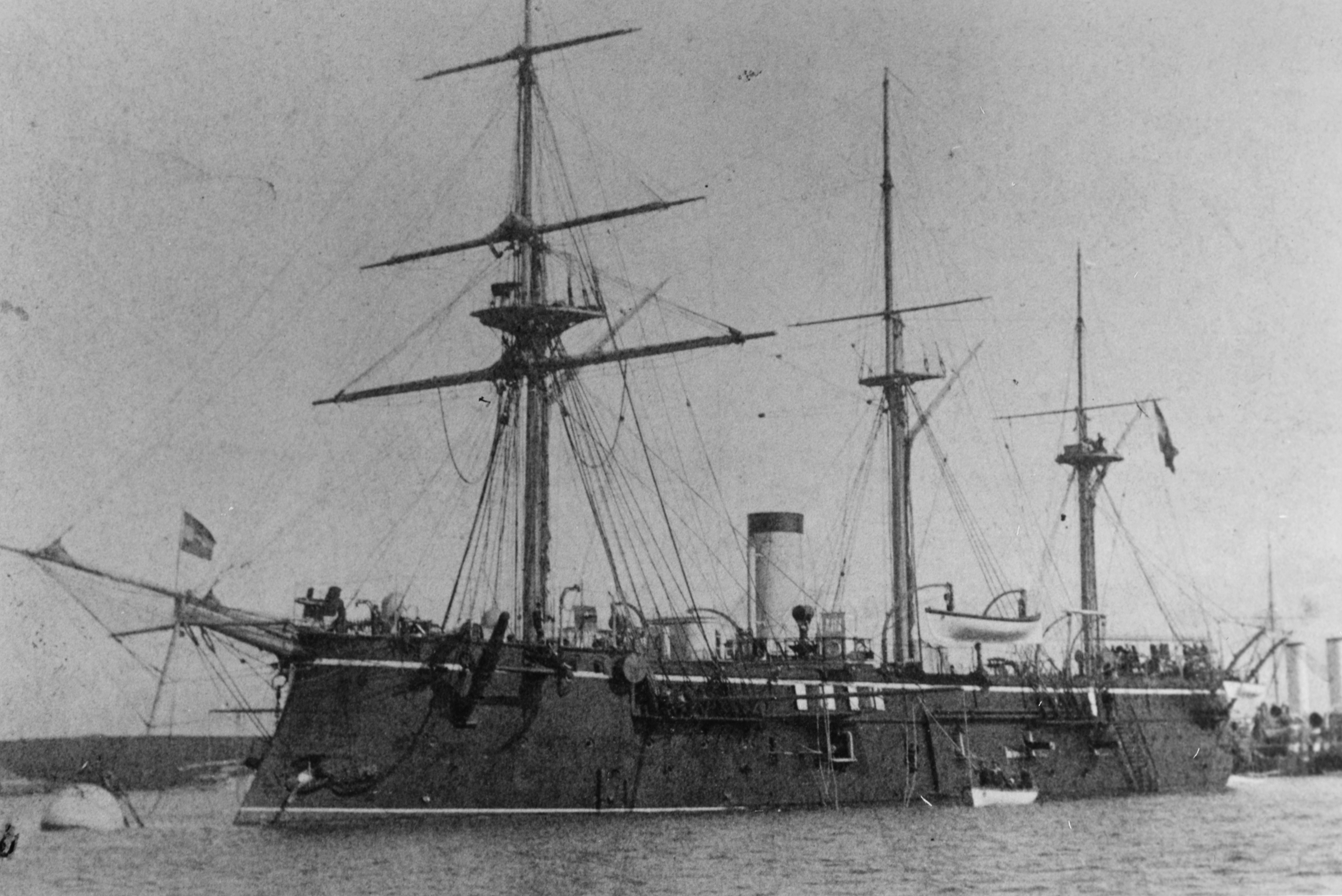
Kaiser Max early in her career

Tegetthoff died in 1871, having been unable to secure the funding for a long-term naval construction program in line with his strategic thinking; his successor, Friedrich von Pöck, proved to be even less successful in terms of convincing parliament to support his priorities. Nevertheless, he was able to strengthen and modernize the Austro-Hungarian fleet during his tenure as Marinekommandant. His first success came in 1873, when he convinced parliament to authorize the reconstruction of the three old and badly rotted Kaiser Max-class ironclads, though he in fact only reused some components from the ships—their engines (though not their boilers), parts of the armor plate, and various fittings to save money. The three ships proved to be an economical investment, costing a similar amount as Erzherzog Albrecht. Romako also prepared the design for these ships; they were small casemate ships, armed with a battery of eight 8.3-inch (21 cm) guns, though unlike earlier casemate ships, the guns could only fire forward, not astern. Also unlike earlier ironclads, which used wrought iron, the new Kaiser Maxes used Bessemer steel in the belt.

Kaiser Max and Don Juan d'Austria were constructed by Stabilimento Tecnico Triestino, while Prinz Eugen was built at the Pola Naval Arsenal. The ships were laid up for much of their existence; Prinz Eugen took part in the same naval demonstration off Ulcinj in 1881 as had Custoza. All three ships participated in the visit to Spain during the 1888 Barcelona Universal Exposition. After the turn of the century, all three vessels were stricken from the register to reduce annual naval expenditures to pay for new construction projects. Kaiser Max and Don Juan d'Austria became barracks ships while Prinz Eugen was renamed Vulkan and converted into a repair ship, all of which served through World War I. Italy seized all three ships after the war, though Don Juan d'Austria sank under mysterious circumstances before she could be formally transferred. The final peace treaty awarded the two surviving ships to the Kingdom of Serbs, Croats and Slovenes, though Italy refused to relinquish Vulkan; her ultimate fate is unknown. After the Royal Yugoslav Navy acquired Kaiser Max, she was renamed Tivat and either scrapped in 1924, or seized by Italy during World War II, her fate after that being unknown.

Ship	Armament	Armor	Displacement	Propulsion	Service		
Ship	Armament	Armor	Displacement	Propulsion	Laid down	Commissioned	Fate
Kaiser Max	8 × 8.3-inch (21 cm) guns	8 in	3,548 long tons (3,605 t)	1 shaft, 1 steam engine, 13.28 knots (24.59 km/h; 15.28 mph)	14 February 1874	26 October 1876	Ceded to the Kingdom of Serbs, Croats and Slovenes, likely broken up in 1924
Don Juan d'Austria	8 × 8.3-inch (21 cm) guns	8 in	3,548 long tons (3,605 t)	1 shaft, 1 steam engine, 13.28 knots (24.59 km/h; 15.28 mph)	14 February 1874	26 June 1876	Sank, 1919
Prinz Eugen	8 × 8.3-inch (21 cm) guns	8 in	3,548 long tons (3,605 t)	1 shaft, 1 steam engine, 13.28 knots (24.59 km/h; 15.28 mph)	October 1874	November 1878	Seized by Italy, fate unknown

== Tegetthoff ==
Tegetthoff in Pola in the late 1880s

In 1875, Pöck won approval for a new casemate ship; this new vessel, the last ironclad to be designed by Romako, was named Tegetthoff after Pöck's predecessor. Tegetthoff would be the only new armored vessel constructed during Pöck's eleven years as head of the Austro-Hungarian Navy. As with earlier vessels, significant components had to be ordered from foreign manufacturers, as Austria-Hungary's industrial capacity was insufficient to fill the orders; steel for the armor came from Britain and her guns were manufactured by Krupp in what was now unified Germany. Tegetthoff was armed with a battery of six 11.0-inch (280 mm) guns in the central casemate; at the time she was built by Stabilimento Tecnico Triestino, she was the largest and most powerful ship of the Austro-Hungarian fleet, a distinction she held for three decades. She was nevertheless a political compromise, built to an obsolescent design and smaller than foreign casemate ships in order to keep costs low.

Tegetthoff's early career was plagued with engine problems that kept her out of service. Though assigned to the Active Squadron in the 1880s, her crew could only keep her engines fully operational in the years 1883, 1887, and 1888. She took part in the visit to Barcelona in 1888 for the Universal Exposition, and was modernized in 1893. Her faulty engines were finally replaced with German-built machinery. From 1897, Tegetthoff was reduced to a guard ship in Pola. Austria-Hungary tried to sell her, Kronprinz Erzherzog Rudolf, and Kronprinzessin Erzherzogin Stephanie to Uruguay in 1908 but the deal fell through. In 1912, she was renamed Mars so her name could be reused for the new dreadnought battleship Tegetthoff launched that year. In 1917, Mars was converted into a training ship and after the war ended in 1918, was ceded to Italy and broken up in 1920.

Ship	Armament	Armor	Displacement	Propulsion	Service		
Ship	Armament	Armor	Displacement	Propulsion	Laid down	Commissioned	Fate
Tegetthoff	6 × 11.0-inch (280 mm) guns	9.1–14.0 in (230–356 mm)	7,390 t (7,273 long tons)	1 shaft, 1 compound steam engine, 13 knots (24 km/h; 15 mph)	1 April 1876	5 August 1882	Ceded to Italy, broken up in 1920

== Kronprinz Erzherzog Rudolf ==
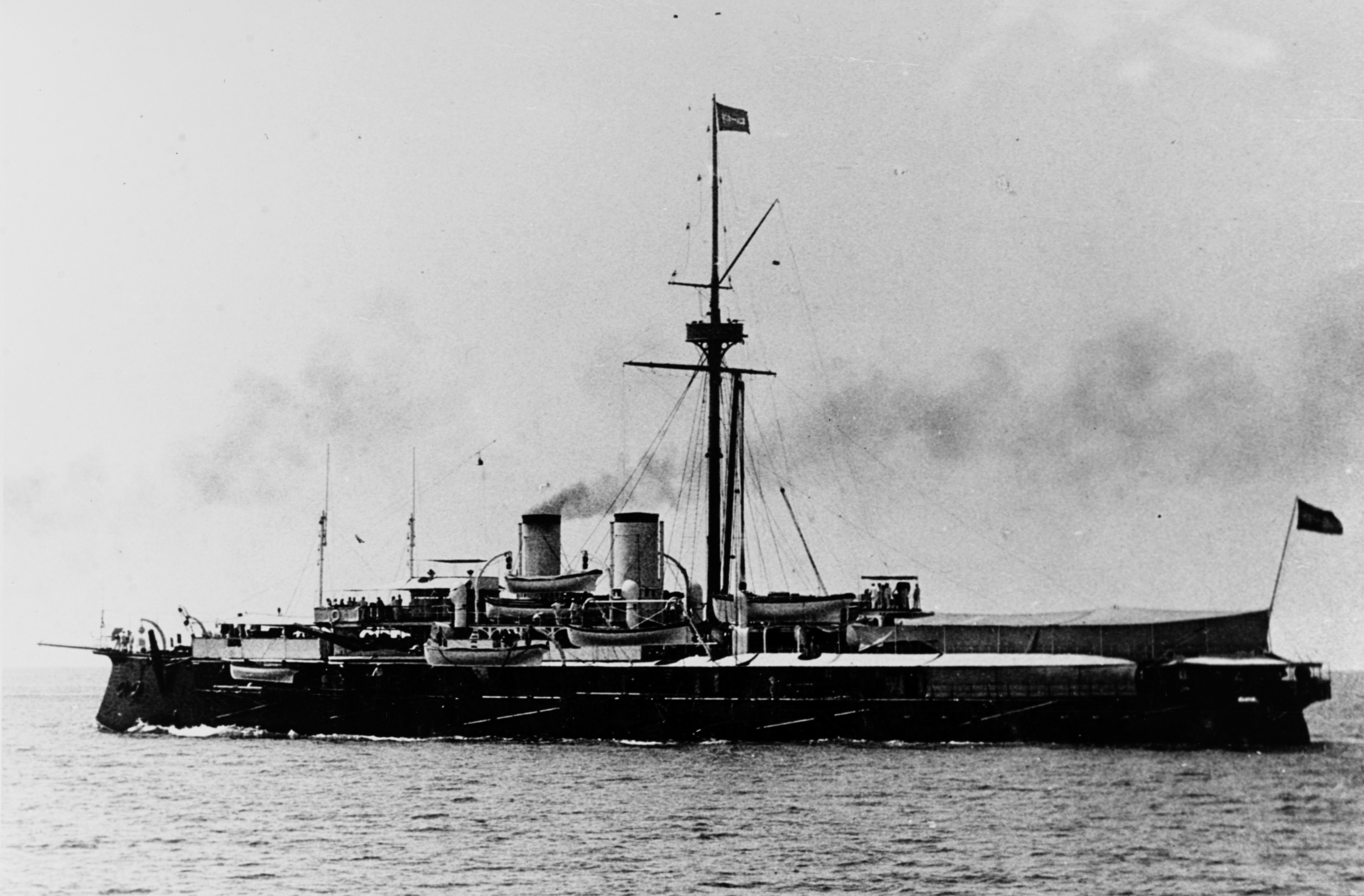
Kronprinz Erzherzog Rudolf with sun shades erected

In 1881, Pöck finally secured funding for another new ironclad to replace the long-since obsolete Salamander. This new ship was the first Austro-Hungarian ironclad not designed by Romako. The designer, Josef Kuchinka, adopted several innovations for the Austro-Hungarian Navy: Kronprinz Erzherzog Rudolf was the first barbette ship of the fleet, and the first Austro-Hungarian capital ship to use compound armor, which was manufactured in Germany. She carried a battery of three 12.0-inch (30.5 cm) guns in individual barbettes, which were the largest guns afloat in the Austro-Hungarian fleet. Additionally, she was the first capital ship equipped with triple-expansion steam engines, which gave her a significantly higher top speed than earlier vessels.

The ship was constructed at the Pola Naval Arsenal. In 1890, the year after she entered service, Kronprinz Erzherzog Rudolf took part in a major cruise abroad, which included stops in Britain, Denmark, Sweden, France, and Italy. During the trip, the ship had repeated problems with her Austro-Hungarian-built engines. She participated in a ceremony in 1892 in Genoa, Italy, celebrating the 400th anniversary of Christopher Columbus's voyage across the Atlantic. By 1898, the Austro-Hungarian Navy considered the ship to be obsolete. Like many of their older ironclads built in the 1860s and 1870s, the rapid pace of naval developments rendered her an out of date design after less than ten years in service. The government tried to sell her, Kronprinzessin Erzherzogin Stephanie, and Tegetthoff to Uruguay in 1908 but the deal fell through.

She served as a coastal defense ship during World War I, based in Cattaro Bay, and was involved in the Cattaro Mutiny in February 1918. Coastal artillery batteries loyal to the government fired on Kronprinz Erzherzog Rudolf and scored a hit, killing one of the mutineers and convincing many of the mutinous ships to surrender. After the war, she was transferred to the Yugoslav Navy and renamed Kumbor, but served only briefly before being broken up in 1922.

Ship	Armament	Armor	Displacement	Propulsion	Service		
Ship	Armament	Armor	Displacement	Propulsion	Laid down	Commissioned	Fate
Kronprinz Erzherzog Rudolf	3 × 12.0-inch (30.5 cm) guns	12 in	6,829 long tons (6,829 long tons)	2 shafts, 2 triple-expansion steam engines, 15.5 kn (28.7 km/h; 17.8 mph)	25 January 1884	September 1889	Ceded to Yugoslavia, broken up in 1922

== Kronprinzessin Erzherzogin Stephanie ==
Kronzprinzessin Erzherzogin Stephanie

Following Pöck's retirement in 1883, his successor, Maximilian Daublebsky von Sterneck (who had been Erzherzog Ferdinand Max's commander at Lissa) also unsuccessfully argued for new ironclad construction to modernize the fleet. When he proved to be unable to convince parliament to allocate funding for a new ship, he resorted to the same budgetary sleight of hand that Pöck had used to "rebuild" the Kaiser Maxes. Shortly before he retired, Pöck had secured funds to modernize Erzherzog Ferdinand Max, and Sterneck instead used it to build a new ship entirely, though he referred to her as Ersatz (replacement) Erzherzog Ferdinand Max while she was under construction by Stabilimento Tecnico Triestino to maintain the fiction. The resulting ship was a smaller version of Kronprinz Erzherzog Rudolf, armed with only two 12-inch guns. She reverted to compound steam engines, though was a full two knots faster.

Kronprinzessin Erzherzogin Stephanie took part in the same trip to northern Europe as Kronprinz Erzherzog Rudolf in 1889 and the Columbus celebrations in 1892. She participated in an international naval demonstration off Crete in 1897. The ship was decommissioned in 1905, and in 1910 was converted into a barracks ship for the mine warfare school, a role she filled through World War I. Italy received the ship after the war as a prize and she was ultimately broken up in 1926.

Ship	Armament	Armor	Displacement	Propulsion	Service		
Ship	Armament	Armor	Displacement	Propulsion	Laid down	Commissioned	Fate
Kronprinzessin Erzherzogin Stephanie	2 × 12-inch guns	9 in	5,075 long tons (5,075 long tons)	2 shafts, 2 compound steam engines, 17 knots (31 km/h; 20 mph)	12 November 1884	July 1889	Ceded to Italy, broken up in 1926

== See also ==
- List of ironclads
- List of cruisers of Austria-Hungary
- List of battleships of Austria-Hungary
- List of ships of Austria-Hungary
