= SMS Salamander (1861) =

Ironclad warship of the Austro-Hungarian Navy

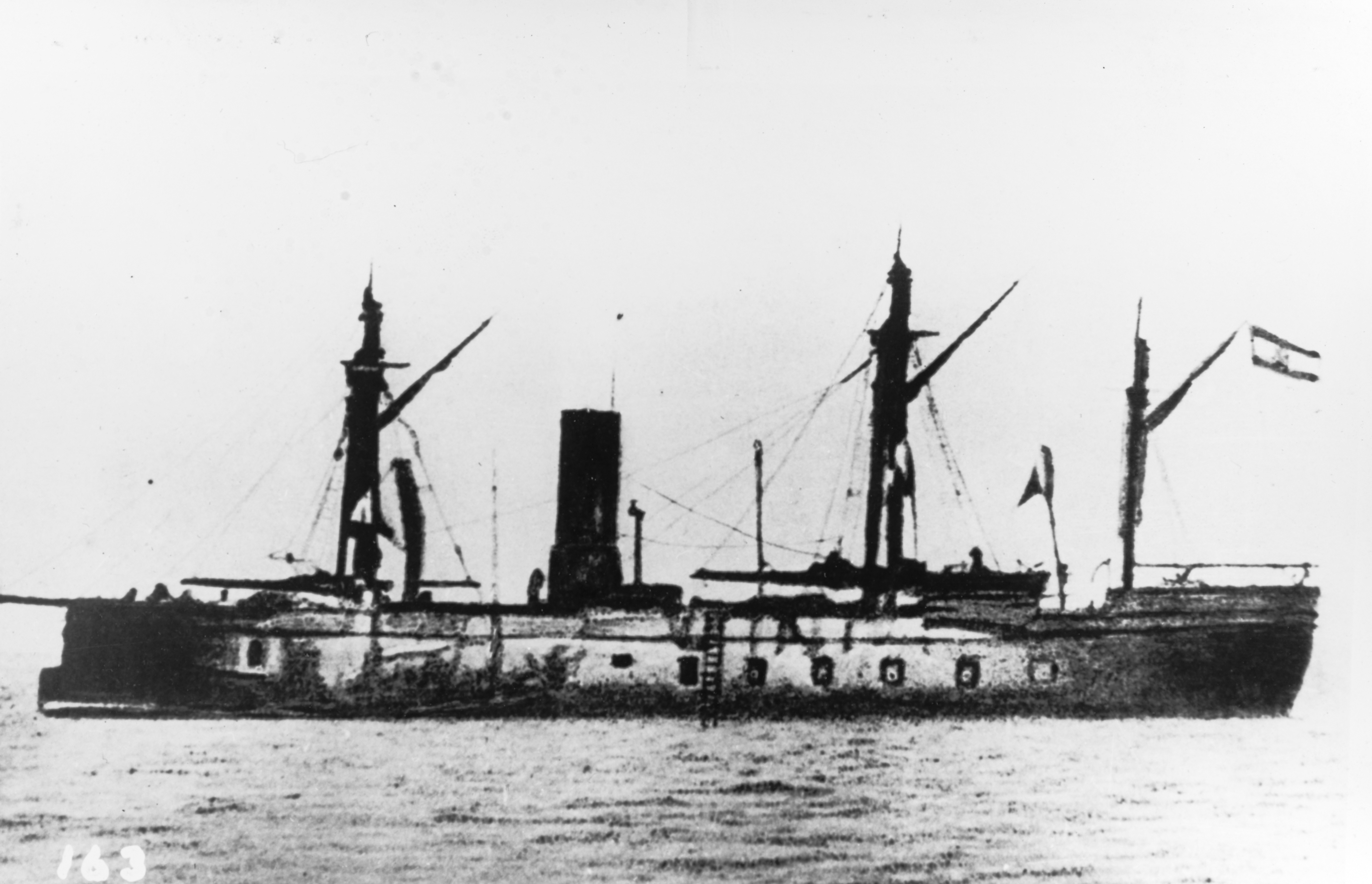
- Salamander before her 1867 refit

History

Austrian Empire
- Name: SMS Salamander
- Namesake: Salamander
- Builder: Stabilimento Tecnico Triestino, Trieste
- Laid down: February 1861
- Launched: 22 August 1861
- Completed: May 1862
- Reclassified: Mine hulk
- Stricken: 18 March 1883
- Fate: Scrapped, 1895–1896

General characteristics (as built)
- Type: Drache-class armored frigate
- Displacement: 3,110 long tons (3,160 t)
- Length: 70.1 m (230 ft)
- Beam: 13.94 m (45 ft 9 in)
- Draft: 6.8 m (22 ft 4 in)
- Installed power: 2,060 ihp (1,540 kW)
- Propulsion: 1 × steam engine; 1 × screw propeller
- Speed: 10.5 knots (19.4 km/h; 12.1 mph)
- Complement: 346
- Armament: 1862: 10 × 48-pounder smoothbore guns; 18 × 24-pounder rifled, muzzle-loading guns; 1867: 10 × RML 7-inch (178 mm) guns; 2 × RML 2-inch (51 mm) guns
- Armor: Waterline belt: 115 mm (4.5 in)

SMS Salamander was a Drache-class armored frigate built for the Austro-Hungarian Navy in the 1860s; she was laid down in February 1861, launched in August that year, and completed in May 1862, six months before her sister Drache. She was a broadside ironclad, mounting a battery of twenty-eight guns in gun ports along the length the hull. During the Second Schleswig War in 1864, Salamander remained in the Adriatic to protect Austria from a possible Danish attack that did not materialize. Two years later, during the Seven Weeks' War, she participated in the Austrian victory over a superior Italian fleet in the Battle of Lissa in July 1866. Immediately after the war, she was modernized with a battery of more powerful guns. Little used thereafter owing to reduced naval budgets, she was stricken from the Navy List in 1883 and hulked for use as a mine storage ship before being broken up in 1895–1896.

== Design and description ==
The Drache class was designed in response to the Formidabile-class ironclads bought from France by the Kingdom of Sardinia in 1860. To make matters worse, Sardinia unified most of Italy later that year; the new kingdom sought Austrian territory, prompting fears of an invasion across the Adriatic Sea. The advent of ironclad warships was still fairly recent, and they were largely untested, but the new Italian ironclads necessitated a response in kind. Despite the chronically tight Austrian naval budget, Archduke Ferdinand Max, the head of the navy, secured funding for two ships of the Drache class. Thus began the Austro-Italian ironclad arms race.

Salamander had an overall length of 70.1 meters (230 ft), a beam of 13.94 m (45 ft 9 in) and a draft of 6.8 meters (22 ft 4 in). They displaced 2,824 long tons (2,869 t) at normal load, and 3,110 long tons (3,160 t) at deep load. The ships had a horizontal steam engine that drove their single propeller using steam provided by four boilers that exhausted through one funnel. The engine produced a total of 2,060 indicated horsepower (1,540 kW) which gave the ships a speed of 10.5 knots (19.4 km/h; 12.1 mph). For long-distance travel, the Draches were fitted with three masts and barque rigged. The ships had a complement of 346 officers and crewmen.

The frigates were armed with ten 48-pounder smoothbore guns and eighteen 24-pounder rifled, muzzle-loading (RML) guns in the traditional broadside arrangement of older ships of the line. In addition, they carried a pair of landing guns, one of which was an 8-pounder and the second was a 4-pounder. They were equipped with ram bows. The Drache-class ironclads had a waterline belt of wrought iron that was 115 millimeters (4.5 in) thick.

== Service history ==
Salamander c. 1862

Salamander was laid down at Stabilimento Tecnico Triestino at its Trieste shipyard in February 1861, launched on 20 or 22 August 1861, and completed in May 1862, some six months before her sister ship Drache. During the Second Schleswig War in 1864, Salamander and Drache remained in the Adriatic to protect Austria's coastline, while a squadron was sent to the North Sea to attack Denmark. In June 1866, Italy declared war on Austria, as part of the Third Italian War of Independence, which was fought concurrently with the Austro-Prussian War. Rear Admiral Wilhelm von Tegetthoff, the commander of the Austrian Fleet, immediately began to mobilize his fleet. As the ships became fully crewed, they began to conduct training exercises in Fasana. Tegetthoff brought the Austrian fleet to Ancona on 27 June, in an attempt to draw out the Italians, but the Italian commander, Admiral Carlo Pellion di Persano, did not sortie to engage Tegetthoff. The Italian failure to give battle is frequently cited as an example of Persano's cowardice, but in fact, the Italian fleet was taking on coal and other supplies after the voyage from Taranto, and was not able to go to sea. Tegetthoff made another sortie on 6 July, but again could not bring the Italian fleet to battle.

=== Battle of Lissa ===
On 16 July, Persano took the Italian fleet out of Ancona and steamed to the island of Lissa, where they arrived on the 18th. With the main fleet of twelve ironclads, they brought troop transports carrying 3,000 soldiers. Persano then spent the next two days bombarding the Austrian defenses of the island and unsuccessfully attempting to force a landing. Tegetthoff received a series of telegrams between the 17 and 19 July notifying him of the Italian attack, which he initially believed to be a feint to draw the Austrian fleet away from its main bases at Pola and Venice. By the morning of the 19th, however, he was convinced that Lissa was in fact the Italian objective, and so he requested permission to attack. As Tegetthoff's fleet arrived off Lissa on the morning of 20 July, Persano's fleet was arrayed for another landing attempt. The latter's ships were divided into three groups, with only the first two able to concentrate in time to meet the Austrians. Tegetthoff had arranged his ironclad ships into a wedge-shaped formation, with Salamander on his left flank; the wooden warships of the second and third divisions followed behind in the same formation.

While he was forming up his ships, Persano transferred from his flagship, Re d'Italia to the turret ship Affondatore. This created a gap in the Italian line, and Tegetthoff seized the opportunity to divide the Italian fleet and create a melee. He made a pass through the gap, but failed to ram any of the Italian ships, forcing him to turn around and make another attempt. Salamander and the other two ships of the left wing, Habsburg and Kaiser Max, attacked the leading Italian division, composed of the ironclads Principe di Carignano, Castelfidardo, and Ancona. In the ensuing close-quarters action, Salamander attempted to ram an unidentified Italian ironclad but failed to connect.

By this time, Re d'Italia had been sunk and the coastal defense ship Palestro was burning badly, soon to be destroyed by a magazine explosion. Persano broke off the engagement, and though his ships still outnumbered the Austrians, he refused to counter-attack with his badly demoralized forces. In addition, the fleet was low on coal and ammunition. The Italian fleet began to withdraw, followed by the Austrians; Tegetthoff, having gotten the better of the action, kept his distance so as not to risk his success. As night began to fall, the opposing fleets disengaged completely, heading for Ancona and Pola, respectively. In the course of the battle, Salamander had been hit by 35 shells, but the Italians had failed to inflict serious damage on Salamander or any of the other Austrian ironclads.

=== Later career ===
After returning to Pola, Tegetthoff kept his fleet in the northern Adriatic, where it patrolled against a possible Italian attack. The Italian ships never came, and on 12 August, the two countries signed the Armistice of Cormons; this ended the fighting and led to the Treaty of Vienna. Though Austria had defeated Italy at Lissa and on land at the Battle of Custoza, the Austrian army was decisively defeated by Prussia at the Battle of Königgrätz. As a result, Austria, which became Austria-Hungary in the Ausgleich of 1867, was forced to cede the city of Venice to Italy. The two halves of the Dual Monarchy held veto power over the other, and Hungarian disinterest in naval expansion led to severely reduced budgets for the fleet. In the immediate aftermath of the war, the bulk of the Austrian fleet was decommissioned and disarmed.

The fleet embarked on a modest modernization program after the war, primarily focused on re-arming the ironclads with new rifled guns. The ship was refitted and rearmed in 1867–1868 with ten 178-millimeter (7 in) and two bronze 51-millimeter (2 in) RML guns. In 1869, Salamander was assigned to a squadron sent to patrol the Levant in the eastern Mediterranean under the command of Rear Admiral Friedrich von Pöck. The squadron also included the ironclad Erzherzog Ferdinand Max, the screw corvette Helgoland, the gunboats Streiter, Reka, and Hum, and the screw schooner Kerka. In early September, Salamander and Erzherzog Ferdinand Max cruised off the island of Rhodes, and on 12 September, they stopped in Smyrna for Salamander to have her bolers repaired. Helgoland joined them there later that month with mail for the ships.

By 1875, the ship had been reduced to a stationary guard ship. By 1883, Salamander's wooden hull had deteriorated to the point where she was no longer seaworthy. In addition, she was infested with cockroaches, rendering her largely uninhabitable. Accordingly, she was stricken from the naval register on 18 March 1883 and converted into a naval mine storage hulk. She served in this capacity for more than a decade before being broken up for scrap in 1895–1896.
