= SMS Kaiser Max =

The Austro-Hungarian Navy operated a pair of ironclad warships named SMS Kaiser Max:

- SMS Kaiser Max (1862), an armored frigate launched in 1862
- SMS Kaiser Max (1875), a center battery ship launched in 1875
