= SMS Drache (1861) =

Ironclad warship of the Austro-Hungarian Navy

- Drache at anchor after her 1867 refit

History

Austrian Empire
- Name: SMS Drache
- Namesake: Dragon
- Builder: Stabilimento Tecnico Triestino, Trieste
- Laid down: February 1861
- Launched: 9 September 1861
- Completed: November 1862
- Stricken: 13 June 1875
- Fate: Scrapped, 1883

General characteristics (as built)
- Type: Drache-class armored frigate
- Displacement: 3,110 long tons (3,160 t)
- Length: 70.1 m (230 ft)
- Beam: 13.94 m (45 ft 9 in)
- Draft: 6.8 m (22 ft 4 in)
- Installed power: 2,060 ihp (1,540 kW)
- Propulsion: 1 × steam engine; 1 × screw propeller
- Speed: 10.5 knots (19.4 km/h; 12.1 mph)
- Complement: 346
- Armament: 1862: 10 × 48-pounder smoothbore guns; 18 × 24-pounder rifled, muzzle-loading guns; 1 × 8-pounder landing gun; 1 × 4-pounder landing gun; 1867: 10 × RML 7-inch (178 mm) guns; 2 × RML 2-inch (51 mm) guns
- Armor: Waterline belt: 115 mm (4.5 in)

SMS Drache was the first of two Drache-class armored frigates built for the Austro-Hungarian Navy in the 1860s, the other being Salamander. Drache was laid down in February 1861, launched in September, and completed in November 1862. She remained in the Adriatic during the Second Schleswig War in 1864 while other ships were sent to attack Denmark. Two years later, Prussia and Italy attacked Austria in the Seven Weeks' War. The ship participated in the Austrian victory over the Italians in the Battle of Lissa, where she inflicted serious damage on the coastal defense ship Palestro, setting her on fire and ultimately destroying her. Drache was modernized immediately after the war, but saw little use thereafter. Badly rotted by 1875, she was stricken from the Navy List that year and eventually broken up in 1883.

== Design and description ==
The Drache class was designed in response to the Formidabile-class ironclads bought from France by the Kingdom of Sardinia in 1860. To make matters worse, Sardinia unified most of Italy later that year; the new kingdom sought Austrian territory, prompting fears of an invasion across the Adriatic Sea. The advent of ironclad warships was still fairly recent, and they were largely untested, but the new Italian ironclads necessitated a response in kind. Despite the chronically tight Austrian naval budget, Archduke Ferdinand Max, the head of the navy, secured funding for two ships of the Drache class. Thus began the Austro-Italian ironclad arms race.

Drache had an overall length of 70.1 meters (230 ft), a beam of 13.94 m (45 ft 9 in) and a draft of 6.8 m (22 ft 4 in). They displaced 2,824 long tons (2,869 t) at normal load, and 3,110 long tons (3,160 t) at deep load. The ships had a horizontal steam engine that drove their single propeller using steam provided by four boilers that exhausted through one funnel. The engine produced a total of 2,060 indicated horsepower (1,540 kW) which gave the ships a speed of 10.5 knots (19.4 km/h; 12.1 mph). For long-distance travel, the Draches were fitted with three masts and barque rigged. The ships had a complement of 346 officers and crewmen.

The frigates were armed with ten 48-pounder smoothbore guns and eighteen 24-pounder rifled, muzzle-loading (RML) guns in the traditional broadside arrangement of older ships of the line. In addition, they carried a pair of landing guns, one of which was an 8-pounder and the second was a 4-pounder. They were equipped with ram bows. The Drache-class ironclads had a waterline belt of wrought iron that was 115 millimeters (4.5 in) thick.

== Service history ==
Drache was laid down at Stabilimento Tecnico Triestino at its Trieste shipyard on 18 February 1861, launched on 9 September 1861, and completed in November 1862. During the Second Schleswig War in 1864, Drache and her sister ship Salamander remained in the Adriatic to protect Austria's coastline, while a squadron was sent to the North Sea to attack Denmark. In June 1866, Italy declared war on Austria, as part of the Third Italian War of Independence, which was fought concurrently with the Austro-Prussian War. Rear Admiral Wilhelm von Tegetthoff, the commander of the Austrian Fleet, immediately began to mobilize his fleet. As the ships became fully crewed, they began to conduct training exercises in Fasana. Tegetthoff brought the Austrian fleet to Ancona on 27 June, in an attempt to draw out the Italians, but the Italian commander, Admiral Carlo Pellion di Persano, did not sortie to engage Tegetthoff. The Italian failure to give battle is frequently cited as an example of Persano's cowardice, but in fact, the Italian fleet was taking on coal and other supplies after the voyage from Taranto, and was not able to go to sea. Tegetthoff made another sortie on 6 July, but again could not bring the Italian fleet to battle.

=== Battle of Lissa ===
Drache c. 1866

On 16 July, Persano took the Italian fleet out of Ancona and steamed to the island of Lissa, where they arrived on the 18th. With the main fleet of twelve ironclads, they brought troop transports carrying 3,000 soldiers. Persano then spent the next two days bombarding the Austrian defenses of the island and unsuccessfully attempting to force a landing. Tegetthoff received a series of telegrams between the 17 and 19 July notifying him of the Italian attack, which he initially believed to be a feint to draw the Austrian fleet away from its main bases at Pola and Venice. By the morning of the 19th, however, he was convinced that Lissa was in fact the Italian objective, and so he requested permission to attack. As Tegetthoff's fleet arrived off Lissa on the morning of 20 July, Persano's fleet was arrayed for another landing attempt. The latter's ships were divided into three groups, with only the first two able to concentrate in time to meet the Austrians. Tegetthoff had arranged his ironclad ships into a wedge-shaped formation, with Drache on his right flank; the wooden warships of the second and third divisions followed behind in the same formation.

While he was forming up his ships, Persano transferred from his flagship, Re d'Italia to the turret ship Affondatore. This created a gap in the Italian line, and Tegetthoff seized the opportunity to divide the Italian fleet and create a melee. He made a pass through the gap, but failed to ram any of the Italian ships, forcing him to turn around and make another attempt. Drache engaged the coastal defense ship Palestro with concentrated broadsides, including hot shot, which started a serious fire aboard Palestro. The latter attempted to withdraw, and was able to use her superior speed to escape from Drache. Left without her original target, Drache turned to fire at Re d'Italia along with several other Austrian vessels. One of them disabled the Italian ship's rudder, leaving her vulnerable to ramming. Tegetthoff steered his flagship at Re d'Italia and scored a clean hit with his ram, badly holing her below the waterline. During this period, Drache was hit several times; one shell struck her commander, Captain Heinrich von Moll, in the head, killing him instantly. Lieutenant Karl Weyprecht took command of the ship for the remainder of the battle. A minor fire was also started, though the ship's crew quickly suppressed it. Another shell knocked down her mainmast. Apart from this, the ship was not badly damaged in the engagement.

After Re d'Italia sank, the Italian fleet began to disengage, with the badly burning Palestro trailing behind, soon to be destroyed by a magazine explosion. Persano broke off the engagement, and though his ships still outnumbered the Austrians, he refused to counter-attack with his badly demoralized forces. In addition, the fleet was low on coal and ammunition. The Italian fleet began to withdraw, followed by the Austrians; Tegetthoff, having gotten the better of the action, kept his distance so as not to risk his success. As night began to fall, the opposing fleets disengaged completely, heading for Ancona and Pola, respectively.

=== Later career ===
After returning to Pola, Tegetthoff kept his fleet in the northern Adriatic, where it patrolled against a possible Italian attack. The Italian ships never came, and on 12 August, the two countries signed the Armistice of Cormons; this ended the fighting and led to the Treaty of Vienna. Though Austria had defeated Italy at Lissa and on land at the Battle of Custoza, the Austrian army was decisively defeated by Prussia at the Battle of Königgrätz. As a result, Austria, which became Austria-Hungary in the Ausgleich of 1867, was forced to cede the city of Venice to Italy. The two halves of the Dual Monarchy held veto power over the other, and Hungarian disinterest in naval expansion led to severely reduced budgets for the fleet. In the immediate aftermath of the war, the bulk of the Austrian fleet was decommissioned and disarmed.

The fleet embarked on a modest modernization program after the war, primarily focused on re-arming the ironclads with new rifled guns. The budget for 1867 provided funds to modernize Drache and Salamander first, as they were the oldest ironclads in the fleet. The ship was refitted and rearmed in 1867–1868 with ten 178-millimeter (7 in) and two bronze 51-millimeter (2 in) RML guns. Worn out and badly deteriorated by 1875, the ship was stricken from the naval register on 13 June. The Navy attempted to sell the ship to China, but the proposed sale came to nothing, and she was eventually sold for scrap in 1883 and broken up over the following year.
