= SMS Kaiser Max (1862) =

Ironclad warship of the Austro-Hungarian Navy

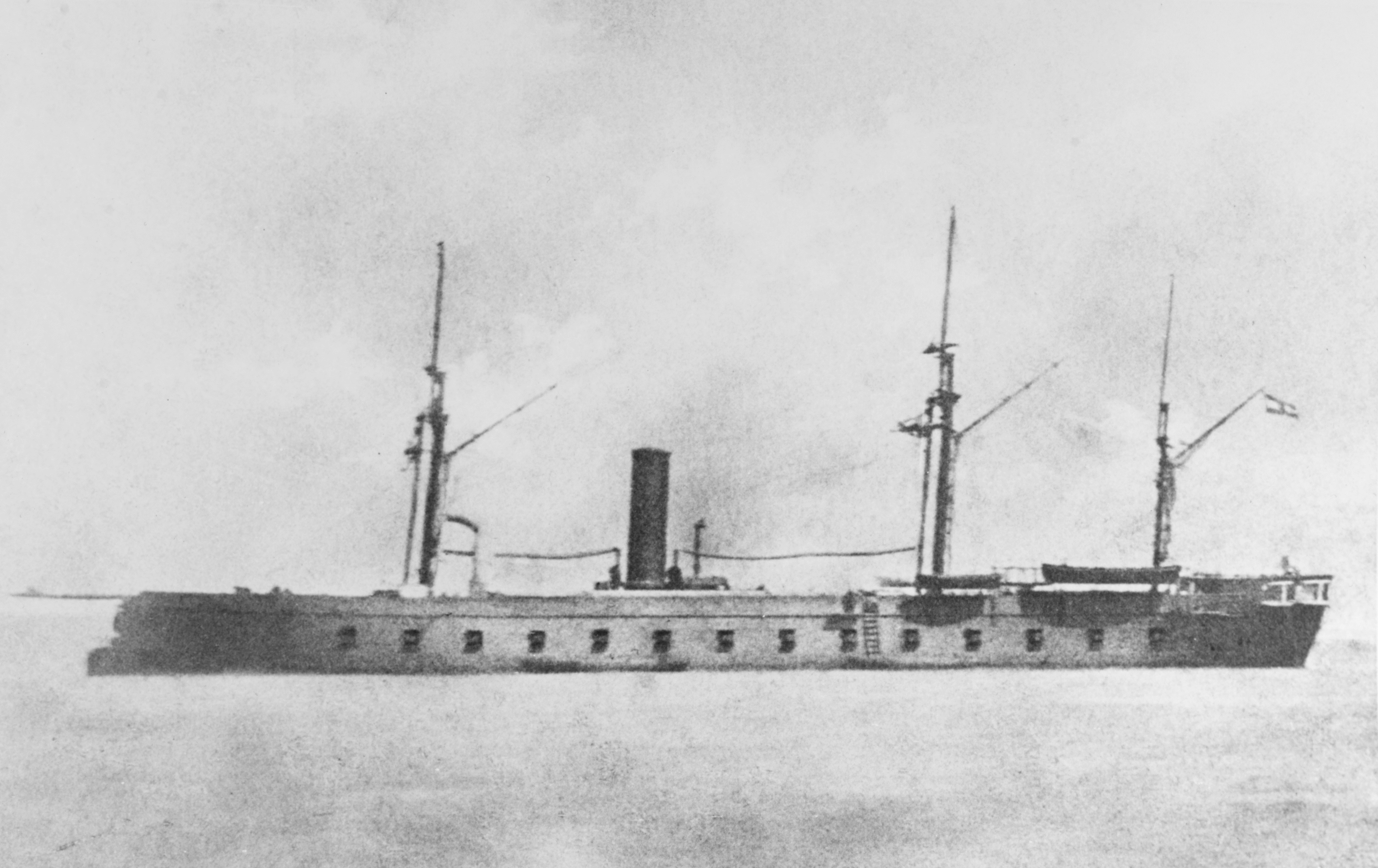
- Illustration of Kaiser Max c. 1866

History

Austrian Empire
- Name: Kaiser Max
- Builder: Stabilimento Tecnico Triestino
- Laid down: October 1861
- Launched: 14 May 1862
- Commissioned: 1863
- Fate: Scrapped, December 1873

General characteristics
- Class & type: Kaiser Max class
- Displacement: 3,588 long tons (3,646 t)
- Length: 70.78 m (232 ft 3 in) pp
- Beam: 10 m (32 ft 10 in)
- Draft: 6.32 m (20 ft 9 in)
- Installed power: 1,926 indicated horsepower (1,436 kW)
- Propulsion: 1 × marine steam engine; 1 × screw propeller
- Speed: 11.4 knots (21.1 km/h; 13.1 mph)
- Range: 1,200 nautical miles (2,200 km; 1,400 mi) at 10 knots (19 km/h; 12 mph)
- Crew: 386
- Armament: 16 × 48-pounder guns; 15 × 24-pounder guns; 1 × 12-pounder gun; 1 × 6-pounder gun
- Armor: Belt: 110 mm (4.3 in)

SMS Kaiser Max was the lead ship of the Kaiser Max class of armored frigates built for the Austrian Navy in the 1860s. Her keel was laid in October 1861 at the Stabilimento Tecnico Triestino shipyard; she was launched in May 1862, and was completed in 1863. She carried her main battery—composed of sixteen 48-pounder guns and fifteen 24-pounders—in a traditional broadside arrangement, protected by an armored belt that was 110 mm (4.3 in) thick.

Kaiser Max saw action at the Battle of Lissa in July 1866. She engaged the Italian coastal defense ship Palestro, which later exploded and sank after sustaining heavy Austrian fire. Kaiser Max emerged from the battle largely unscathed, save for minor damage to her funnel and rigging inflicted by the armored frigate Re d'Italia. After the war, Kaiser Max was modernized slightly in 1867 to correct her poor seakeeping and improve her armament, but she was nevertheless rapidly outpaced by naval developments in the 1860s and 1870s. Obsolescent by 1873, Kaiser Max was officially "rebuilt", though in actuality she was broken up for scrap, with only her armor plate, parts of her machinery, and other miscellaneous parts being reused in the new Kaiser Max.

== Design ==
Having already secured funding for the two Drache-class ironclads, the head of the Austrian Navy, Archduke Ferdinand Max, argued in 1862 for an expanded fleet of ironclad warships as part of the Austro-Italian ironclad arms race. He requested a total force of nine ironclads, which would counter the known construction program of the Italian Regia Marina—then at four ironclads already ordered, with more funding authorized for future vessels. For 1862, he proposed building three ironclads, along with converting a pair of sail frigates to steam frigates. The Austrian Reichsrat (Imperial Council) refused to grant funding for the program, but Kaiser Franz Joseph intervened and authorized the navy to place orders for the new ships, which became the Kaiser Max class.

Kaiser Max was 70.78 meters (232 ft 3 in) long between perpendiculars; she had a beam of 10 m (32 ft 10 in) and an average draft of 6.32 m (20 ft 9 in). She displaced 3,588 long tons (3,646 t). She had a crew of 386. Her propulsion system consisted of one single-expansion steam engine that drove a single screw propeller. The number and type of her coal-fired boilers have not survived. Her engine produced a top speed of 11.4 knots (21.1 km/h; 13.1 mph) from 1,926 indicated horsepower (1,436 kW). She could steam for about 1,200 nautical miles (2,200 km; 1,400 mi) at a speed of 10 knots (19 km/h; 12 mph).

Kaiser Max was a broadside ironclad, and she was armed with a main battery of sixteen 48-pounder muzzle-loading guns and fifteen 24-pounder 15 cm (5.9 in) rifled muzzle-loading guns. She also carried a single 12-pounder gun and a six-pounder. The ship's hull was sheathed with wrought iron armor that was 110 mm (4 in) thick.

== Service history ==
Kaiser Max was built by the Stabilimento Tecnico Triestino (STT) shipyard; her keel was laid down in October 1861, and her completed hull was launched on 14 May 1862. Fitting-out work was completed the following year, when she was commissioned into the Austrian fleet. She proved to be very wet forward owing to her open bow, and as a result, tended to handle poorly. In June 1864, she collided with the British merchant ship Rapid off the coast of Portugal, severely damaging her. In June 1866, Italy declared war on Austria, as part of the Third Italian War of Independence, which was fought concurrently with the Austro-Prussian War. Rear Admiral Wilhelm von Tegetthoff, the commander of the Austrian Fleet, immediately began to mobilize his fleet. As the ships became fully crewed, they began to conduct training exercises in Fasana. Tegetthoff brought the Austrian fleet to Ancona on 27 June, in an attempt to draw out the Italians, but the Italian commander, Admiral Carlo Pellion di Persano, did not sortie to engage Tegetthoff. The Italian failure to give battle is frequently cited as an example of Persano's cowardice, but in fact, the Italian fleet was taking on coal and other supplies after the voyage from Taranto, and was not able to go to sea. Tegetthoff made another sortie on 6 July, but again could not bring the Italian fleet to battle.

=== Battle of Lissa ===
Map showing the disposition of the fleets on 20 July

On 16 July, Persano took the Italian fleet, with twelve ironclads, out of Ancona, bound for the island of Lissa, where they arrived on the 18th. With them, they brought troop transports carrying 3,000 soldiers. Persano then spent the next two days bombarding the Austrian defenses of the island and unsuccessfully attempting to force a landing. Tegetthoff received a series of telegrams between the 17 and 19 July notifying him of the Italian attack, which he initially believed to be a feint to draw the Austrian fleet away from its main base at Pola and Venice. By the morning of the 19th, however, he was convinced that Lissa was in fact the Italian objective, and so he requested permission to attack. As Tegetthoff's fleet arrived off Lissa on the morning of 20 July, Persano's fleet was arrayed for another landing attempt. The latter's ships were divided into three groups, with only the first two able to concentrate in time to meet the Austrians. Tegetthoff had arranged his ironclad ships into a wedge-shaped formation, with Kaiser Max on his left flank; the wooden warships of the second and third divisions followed behind in the same formation.

While he was forming up his ships, Persano transferred from his flagship, Re d'Italia to the turret ship Affondatore. This created a gap in the Italian line, and Tegetthoff seized the opportunity to divide the Italian fleet and create a melee. He made a pass through the gap, but failed to ram any of the Italian ships, forcing him to turn around and make another attempt. After the second pass, Kaiser Max engaged Re d'Italia, with the latter damaging Kaiser Max's rigging and funnel. After the Italian ship had been rammed and sunk by Erzherzog Ferdinand Max, Kaiser Max attempted to ram another Italian vessel without success. She then engaged the small coastal defense ship Palestro with fifteen broadsides. The Austrian ironclad Don Juan d'Austria then became surrounded by Italian ships, prompting Kaiser Max to come to her rescue.

Around this time, Persano broke off the engagement, and though his ships still outnumbered the Austrians, he refused to counter-attack with his badly demoralized forces. In addition, the fleet was low on coal and ammunition. The Italian fleet began to withdraw, followed by the Austrians; Tegetthoff, having gotten the better of the action, kept his distance so as not to risk his success. As night began to fall, the opposing fleets disengaged completely, heading for Ancona and Pola, respectively. Kaiser Max had emerged from the battle essentially undamaged, the Italian shells having been unable to penetrate her armor.

=== Later career ===
After returning to Pola, Tegetthoff kept his fleet in the northern Adriatic, where it patrolled against a possible Italian attack. The Italian ships never came, and on 12 August, the two countries signed the Armistice of Cormons; this ended the fighting and led to the Treaty of Vienna. Though Austria had defeated Italy at Lissa and on land at the Battle of Custoza, Italy's ally Prussia had decisively defeated the Austrian army at the Battle of Königgrätz. As a result, Austria, which became Austria-Hungary in the Ausgleich of 1867, was forced to cede the city of Venice to Italy. In the immediate aftermath of the war, the bulk of the Austrian fleet was decommissioned and disarmed.

The fleet embarked on a modest modernization program after the war, primarily focused on re-arming the ironclads with new rifled guns. Kaiser Max was rebuilt in 1867, particularly to correct her poor seakeeping. Her open bow was plated over and she was rearmed with twelve 7-inch (178 mm) muzzleloaders manufactured by Armstrong and two 3-inch (76 mm) 4-pounder guns. By 1873, the ship was obsolescent and had a thoroughly rotted hull, so the Austro-Hungarian Navy decided to replace the ship. Parliamentary objection to granting funds for new ships forced the navy to resort to subterfuge to replace the ship. Reconstruction projects were routinely approved by the parliament, so the navy officially "rebuilt" Kaiser Max and her sister ships. In reality, Kaiser Max was completely broken up at the STT shipyard starting in December 1873, and only some parts of the engines, her armor plate, and other miscellaneous parts were salvaged for use in the new Kaiser Max, so-named to conceal the fact that she was a new vessel.
