= Battle of Lissa (1866) =

Third Italian War of Independence naval battle

- Part of the Third Italian War of Independence
- Sea Battle at Lissa; Carl Frederik Sørensen, 1868
Date	20 July 1866
Location	Off Lissa, Adriatic Sea 43°10′35″N 16°3′12″E
Result	Austrian victory

Belligerents
Austrian Empire	Kingdom of Italy

Commanders and leaders
Wilhelm von Tegetthoff	Carlo Pellion di Persano

Strength
4 ironclads 3 armoured frigates 1 ship of the line 5 screw frigates 1 screw corvette 2 screw gunboats 6 gunboats 1 screw tender 3 steamships	9 ironclads 1 armoured frigate 2 armoured corvettes 7 screw frigates 1 screw corvette 2 paddle corvettes 1 sloop 3 gunboats 2 avisos 4 merchantmen

Casualties and losses
38 killed 138 wounded	612 killed 36 wounded 19 captured 1 armoured frigate sunk 1 gunboat sunk
- Location within Croatia

The Battle of Lissa (also known as the Battle of Vis; Croatian: Bitka kod Visa) was fought on 20 July 1866 between the Italian and Austrian navies near the island of Lissa in the Adriatic Sea during the Third Italian War of Independence. An Italian fleet under Admiral Carlo Pellion di Persano engaged an Austrian fleet led by Vice-Admiral Wilhelm von Tegetthoff in an attempt to break Austria's naval dominance in the Adriatic. The battle was the first in which ironclad warships were used on a major scale. Both fleets exhibited several technical deficiencies, while the Italian fleet also suffered from severe rivalries between its officers. The Austrians were victorious, relieving Lissa after sinking two Italian warships, in part by using naval ramming tactics. Persano was disgraced upon his return to Italy, while Tegetthoff received widespread praise and accolades for his victory.

== Background ==
In order to seize the last areas of the Apennine Peninsula that were still in the hands of the Habsburg Empire, the Kingdom of Italy entered into an alliance with Prussia. War broke out between Prussia and Austria in mid-June 1866. Italy also declared war on Austria and had its troops march into Veneto. Although the Italian army outnumbered the Austrians, it was defeated at Custoza on 24 June and forced to retreat.

Shortly before the Italians were ready to resume the offensive, the French emperor Napoleon III telegraphed the Italians on the night of 4 July that Austria had offered to cede Veneto to him on the basis of an armistice in order to return it to Italy. However, Napoleon III's own plans were thwarted by the news of the Austrian defeat at the Battle of Königgrätz. The emperor's telegram was followed three days later by the threat that he would return Venice to Austria if the armistice was rejected and perhaps enter into an alliance with it. This put the Italians in a terrible dilemma, as risking a break with France was too great a risk.

The Italians replied to the Emperor that they could not conclude an armistice without Prussian consent and made their acceptance conditional on the immediate surrender of the Venetian fortresses and French support for their claims to Trieste. In the meantime, Italy wanted to use the time to occupy Istria and later use it as a bargaining chip in the peace negotiations.

== Prelude ==
Admiral Persano had already been instructed on 10 June 1866 to clear the Adriatic of Austrian warships and merchant ships on the outbreak of war and to make Ancona an operational base on the Adriatic, but not to attack Trieste and Venice for the time being. After Austria officially declared war on Italy on 20 June, the Italians initially planned to occupy Austrian coastal territory on the Adriatic.

After Tegetthoff was informed of the declaration of war, he immediately took measures to take offensive action against the Italian fleet when a favorable opportunity arose. In order to obtain information about the strength and movements of the Italians, he sent the steamer Stadion on the same day to reconnoiter the coast from Ancona to Bari. On 23 June, Stadion returned with the news that no enemy warships had been sighted.

Assuming that the Italians had only assembled part of their fleet in the roadstead at Ancona, Tegetthoff quickly decided to undertake a second reconnaissance from Pula to Ancona. On 24 June he asked Archduke Albrecht whether he would be permitted to take the offensive and carry out reconnaissance missions on the Italian coast. In the meantime, he also held a council of war with his ship commanders and weighed the chances of an operation against Ancona and a possible attack on any Italian ships anchored there. The Archduke's reply arrived on 26 June: "No obstacle in the way of the free action of the squadron, only not beyond Lissa; keep an eye on the mouths of the Po and the coast of Venice." With the approval of the Austrian high command, the Austrian fleet sailed from Pula on the evening of 26 June with Tegetthoff flying his flag on the ironclad frigate Erzherzog Ferdinand Max.

After the Italian coast came into sight at dawn on 27 June, the Austrians set course for Monte Conero. At around 04:00 a lookout on Erzerhog Ferdinand Max sighted smoke in the direction of their course. Around 04:20 a steamer was sighted by the gunboat Kaiserin Elisabeth, which was directed to investigate. When Elisabeth approached the unknown steamer to within about 1.5 nautical miles (1.7 mi), the ship - the dispatch boat Radaviso Esploratore under the command of the Marchese di Orengo - hoisted the Italian flag. This was answered by Elisabeth hoisting the Austrian flag and firing a few shots, whereupon Esploratore immediately turned and headed for Ancona.

Elisabeth tried to cut off the Italian ship, but Esploratore soon got out of range due to her greater speed, and by 05:30 she was about 2.5 nautical miles (2.9 mi) from Ancona. Contrary to Austrian expectations, most of the Italian fleet was now anchored at Ancona. The Italians, alerted by Esploratore, then set sail, and around 06:30, four of their ironclads approached Monte Conero, followed at intervals by other Italian ships.

Due to the presence of Italian coastal artillery and a possible naval mine belt, Tegetthoff decided to withdraw to Pula at 07:30. Admiral Persano then cruised along the latitude of Lissa from 9-11 July, but without taking any action against the Austrians. His passive behavior was increasingly criticized and the Italian Minister of the Navy ordered him to finally take some form of offensive action. It was therefore decided to occupy the island of Lissa, and to create a naval base of operations so that an Italian land force could later land in Dalmatia in relative safely.

== Opposing fleets ==
=== Italy ===
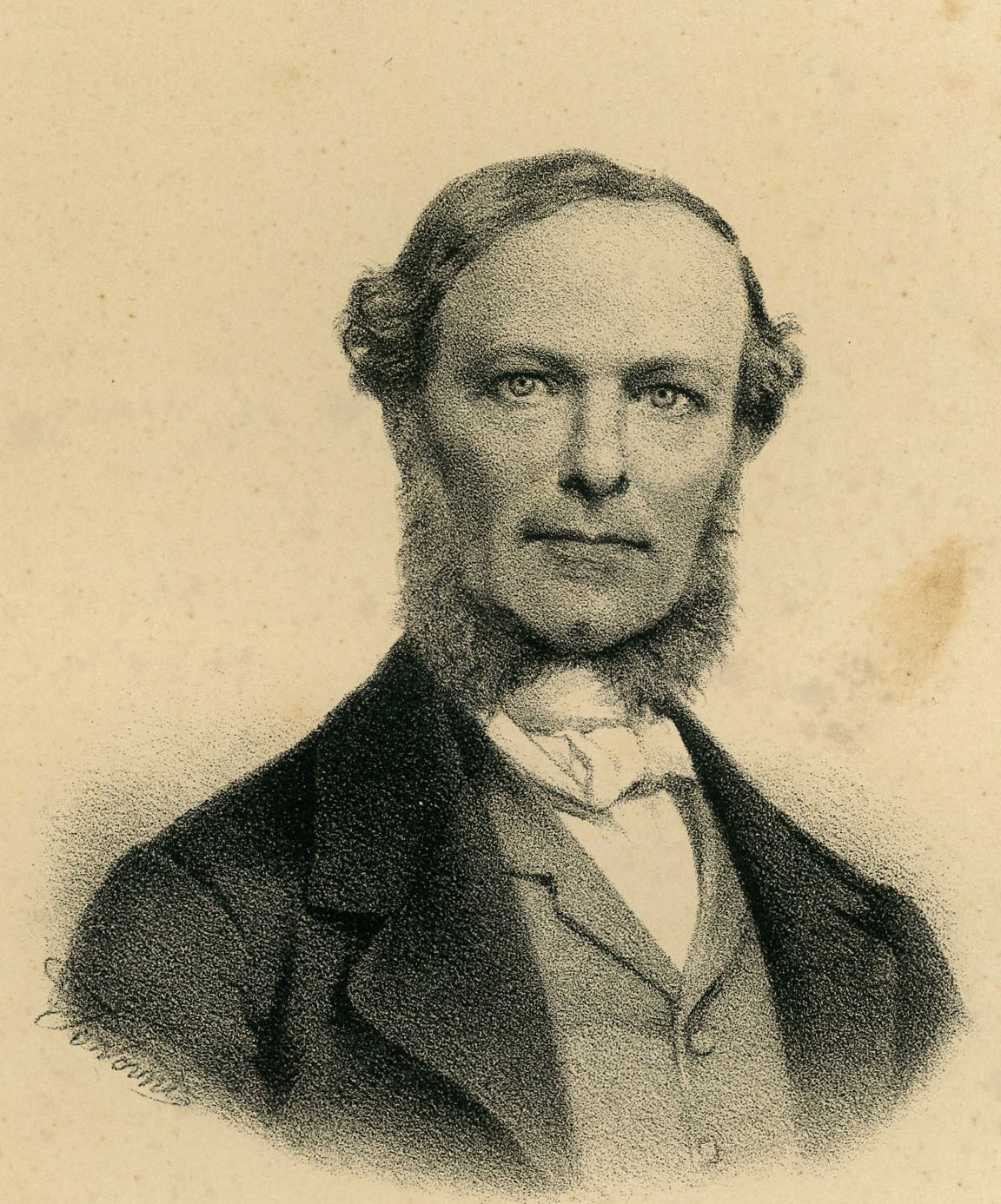
Carlo Pellion di Persano, the Italian commander at the battle

The armoured frigates Re d'Italia and the Re di Portogallo were both built in New York City. They had a displacement of 5,700 metric tons (5,600 long tons) each, 177 millimetres (7.0 in) thick armour and were equipped with powerful artillery. However, they were not good seagoing vessels as they lacked buoyancy and maneuverability, and their rudders were unprotected. Italy also had the Affondatore, a turret ship built in Great Britain in 1866, with 127 millimetres (5.0 in) armor and equipped with two 300-pounder Armstrong guns and an 26 feet (7.9 m)-long ramming spur. According to an article in the London Times, it was capable of destroying the Austrian fleet single-handedly if necessary. However, the Affondatore also had serious design flaws.

The ironclads Regina Maria Pia, Castelfidardo, Ancona, San Martino and Principe di Carignano were also armored and had a continuous armored belt on the waterline. Two smaller ironclads, Terribile and Formidabile, each with a displacement of 2,700 metric tons (2,700 long tons), were built in France. They had 101 millimetres (4.0 in) thick armor and were equipped with 152 millimetres (6.0 in) guns. Two armored gunboats, Palestro and the Varese, each carried two Armstrong 150-pounders and several smaller guns.

Behind these twelve ships, which formed the first line of the Italian fleet, were nine wooden frigates and corvettes with steam propulsion, but of an older type that armor had made obsolete. Dissatisfied with the state of his fleet, Admiral Persano repeatedly pointed out a number of deficiencies to the responsible naval minister, General Diego Angioletti. Persano estimated that he would need at least another month to get the fleet into fighting condition. On 20 June, Angioletti was replaced by Agostino Depretis, who ordered Persano to sail immediately and assemble the fleet at Ancona.

=== Austria ===
The Austrians had the ironclads Habsburg, Erzherzog Ferdinand Max, Drache, Kaiser Max, Prinz Eugen, Don Juan d'Austria, and Salamander. Each had 101 millimetres (4.0 in) thick armor but were armed with obsolete muzzle-loading guns. In addition, the fleet consisted of the wooden ship-of-the-line Kaiser with ninety-one guns, the frigates Adria, Donau , Novara, Radetzky, and Schwarzenberg, as well as ten gunboats (Narenta, Kerka, Hum, Vellebich, Dalmat, Seehund, Wal, Streiter, Reka, Andreas Hofer, Kaiserin Elisabeth, Greif, and Stadion).

After the naval battle at Heligoland in the German-Danish War, Rear Admiral von Tegetthoff, who was extremely popular with his subordinates, was considered one of the most experienced and creative naval commanders in Europe, especially when it came to compensating for the Austrian fleet's lack of combat power via emergency solutions.

== Battle ==
=== Lissa ===
Initial situation of the battle, with Austrian ships in red and Italian ships in blue

The island of Lissa is located in the middle of the Adriatic Sea about 34 miles from the Croatian coast and 80 miles from the Italian coast. The island has several bays and harbors, which were equipped with batteries for defense. On the north-eastern side is Vis with the port of San Giorgio. To the south are the bays of Carober, Gradac, Portochiave and Travna. On the south-eastern side: the bays of Milna and Ruda and the port of Manego. After Austria came into possession of the island of Lissa in 1815, the existing fortifications were strengthened and new works added. At that time, 1,833 Austrian soldiers under the command of Colonel David Freiherr von Urs de Margina and around 100 cannons were available for the defense of the rugged and densely wooded island. There was also a police station on the 639 yd-high hill of Hum, which was in telegraphic contact with the Dalmatian mainland via the neighboring island of Hvar.

=== Order of Battle ===
Rear Admiral von Tegetthoff was not entirely free in his choice of attack formation. The planned attack required the armored division to form the vanguard and to simultaneously adopt a formation that enabled it to steam full speed at the enemy. However, since the Austrian ships did not all achieve the same speed, he decided against the line-ahead formation. In this formation, there was a risk that the faster ships might collide with the slower ones when breaking out of the line. For this reason, and to ensure optimal utilization of his combat strength, he opted for a wedge formation.

Admiral Persano divided his armored ships into three divisions. The first division, under Rear Admiral Giovanni Vacca, consisted of Principe di Carignano, Castelfidardo, and Ancona. The second division, under Admiral Persano himself, included Re d’Italia, Palestro, and San Martino. Finally, the third division, under Captain Riboty, comprised Re di Portogallo, Varese, Maria Pia, Terribile, and Formidabile. Rear Admiral Giovanni Battista Albini’s squadron consisted of four frigates, one corvette, five scouts, three gunboats, a hospital ship, and two troop transports.

=== Attack ===
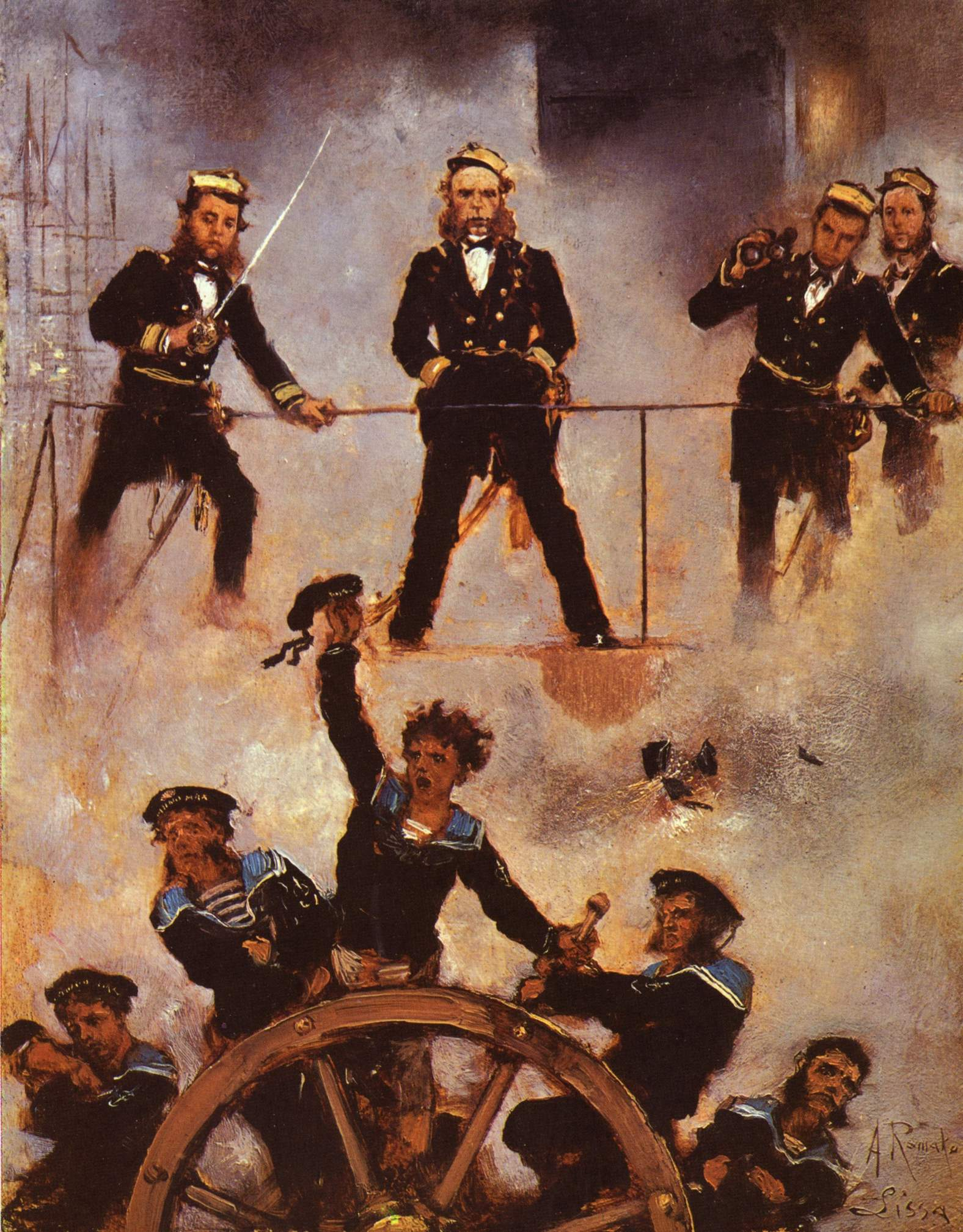
1880 painting of Tegetthoff at the battle

Persano set sail on the afternoon of 16 July 1866. The fleet initially took a north-easterly course in order to conceal the target. During the night of 16–17 July, the Messaggero, sailing under a false British flag with Chief of Staff d'Amico on board, approached the coast to reconnoiter the positions of the Austrian coastal batteries and fortresses. Persano's plan was to bombard San Georgio with most of his fleet, destroy the Komiža forts with a smaller detachment so that a later arriving force could land there, and land the expeditionary force he had with him at Manego.

The Italian gunboats were sent to Hvar to cut the telegraph cable to Lissa and destroy any boats that could transmit information to the mainland. One scout was sent to cross between the islands of Palagruža and Svetac, another to Punta Planca on the mainland. This division exposed the Italians to the risk of being destroyed by locally superior Austrian units. Moreover, so much time had been lost in issuing orders that should have been given before the fleet left that the Italians did not reach their positions until after 10:00 on 18 July. Due to this delay, the Austrians had had enough time to telegraph the arrival of the Italians to Tegetthoff. At 10:30 Persano gave the order to bombard the island.

The first division under Rear Admiral Vacca approached the batteries at Komiža under fire up to 1,600 yards and then opened fire on the Austrian positions. However, at up to 273 yards above sea level, the coastal batteries were too high for the Italian guns. Consequently, after a few hours of useless shelling, Vacca decided to sail to Manego and support Rear Admiral Albini. Albini, who had received orders to destroy the batteries at Nadpostranje and land troops in the bay of Rukavac, reached his position at around 11:15. Shortly afterwards, the Austrian guns opened fire on the approaching Italians.

Albini was faced with the same problem as Rear Admiral Vacca and also decided to cease firing. Albini then sent the corvette San Giovanni to San Giorgio to ask Persano for further orders. After Vacca had reached Manego at around 14:00, Albini informed him of the situation, whereupon Vacca decided to continue on to San Giorgio. Meanwhile, Admiral Persano had approached San Giorgio from the north and Captain Riboty from the south. While Persano intended to attack Fort George, Riboty was to attack Fort Wellington. After most of Fort George's guns had been silenced by 15:00, Persano ordered Maria Pia and San Martino to enter the harbor at 16:00 and destroy the inner gun batteries.

As the two Italian ships entered the harbor, they came under fire from both the eastern guns of Fort Wellington and the inner gun batteries. In the meantime, Rear Admiral Vacca had appeared at about 16:45 and had received immediate orders to support Riboty in his attack on Fort Wellington. By 17:00, Fort George had ceased firing after half of its guns had been destroyed and a fifth of its soldiers had fallen. Only Fort Wellington was still resisting. In this situation, Persano decided to break off the battle and allow his men to rest.

During the night of 18-19 July, Persano received the news that Tegetthoff had been informed of the Italian attack. However, Admiral Persano decided to continue his operation against the island, as he expected that if Tegetthoff had indeed sailed, he would not arrive before the evening of 19 July. The Austrians worked throughout the night to repair the damage caused by the Italians and restore their defensive capabilities. At dawn on 19 July, the Affondatore arrived with the frigates Carlo Alberto and Principe Umber, bringing a further 2,600 men with them. The Terribile and Varese were ordered to attack Komiža, while Albini's division was to cover the disembarkation of the troops.

At the same time, the Formidabile, supported by the three ships of Vacca's division, was to enter the port of San Giorgio, while Persano himself intended to attack the outer fortresses again. The Austrian fortifications again withstood the bombardment and the Italian divisional commanders proved too timid to land the troops. By 20:00, the Italian fleet had again broken off the attack and retreated 8 nautical miles (9.2 mi) north of San Georgio.

After receiving further telegrams from Lissa about the presence and activities of the Italian fleet, Tegetthoff decided to leave his safe position in the northern Adriatic at Pula with his fleet immediately in order to relieve the hard-pressed garrison on the island. The entire Austrian fleet sailed out of the Fažana Channel at around 13:30 on 19 July and headed south at full steam.

Tegetthoff had formulated his instructions for the attack precisely. The division of ironclads (Panzerschiff-Abteilung) was to break through the Italian line, ram their ships and concentrate their fire. The wooden ships were to attack one or other wing of the Italian line or be deployed as they saw fit. The gunboats were to split into three groups and support the wooden ships in their action.

The Italians were sighted at 06:40 on the morning of 20 July. Shortly after 09:00, the order “Prepare for battle” was given to the Austrian fleet. This was followed by the signals “Close up” and “Full speed” and finally at 10:35 to the armored ships: “Attack and sink the enemy”. After the Italians had sighted the Austrians, Persano gave a number of signals.

Persano first ordered Terribile and Varese to join his division, then had his own ships and those of Vacca deploy in line of bearing to the northwest. He gave Albini the signal to leave the boats and men ashore and at the same time ordered him to position his wooden ships behind the ironclad line. When he realized a few minutes later that his line was pointing in the wrong direction, Persano gave the signals: “Steer northeast for one minute”, then “Close up” and “Attack the enemy”.

The Italian ironclads were slow to reach their positions as Re di Portogallo and Castelfidardo reported engine failures. After repairs, they finally took their places. Formidabile steamed off to Ancona after signaling to Persano that it could not fight due to damage sustained from the earlier duel with the Austrian shore batteries. Shortly after the Italians had formed up, Persano changed his mind and ordered a line formation. First came Carignano, followed by Castelfidardo and Ancona, forming the vanguard. They were followed by Re d'Italia, Affondatore, Palestro, and San Martino in the center. In the rear of the line were Ribotti, Re di Portogallo and Maria Pia. Terribile and Varese were still several nautical miles away to the south, so that the entire line covered a space of 13 nautical miles (15 mi).

At around 10:00, Persano decided that he needed a fast, maneuverable ship to monitor the fighting outside the battle line. Since the Re d'Italia was neither fast nor maneuverable, he decided to switch to the Affondatore. Unfortunately, the Affondatore only had a vice admiral's flag, not an admiral's flag, and no signal was sent to the rest of the fleet announcing the change. The stopping of the Re d'Italia also created a significant gap in the line of Italian armored ships. The Italian armored line was therefore only closed up at the front. In the center, Re d'Italia was isolated, and at the end, the gaps between the ships were much wider than they should have been according to the order.

Tegetthoff recognized his chance and broke through the Italian line between Re d'Italia and Ancona at 10:50. The Austrians engaged in an exchange of fire with Vacca's division, but the Italian shells missed the Austrian ships due to the heavy swell. Whether because of the smoke from their own guns or because the Italians had maneuvered well, the Austrians were unable to ram any Italian ships during this first attack. After the Austrians had passed the gap, Vacca had broken off to port with his three ships to attack the weaker Austrian rearguard.

However, he executed the movement very slowly, so that the Austrian rearguard had pushed through the gap before Vacca had completed his turn. Led by Kaiser, Novara, Friedrich Max, Radetzky, Adria, Schwarzenberg and Donau now sailed south to attack the Italian wooden ships. Kaiser was initially confronted by the Affondatore, which opened fire on the Kaiser, killing six men and causing minor damage. Kaiser returned fire and after the other Austrian ships also concentrated their fire on Affondatore, the Italian ship withdrew to the west. Shortly afterwards, Ribotti's division, reinforced by the Varese, opened fire on Kaiser.

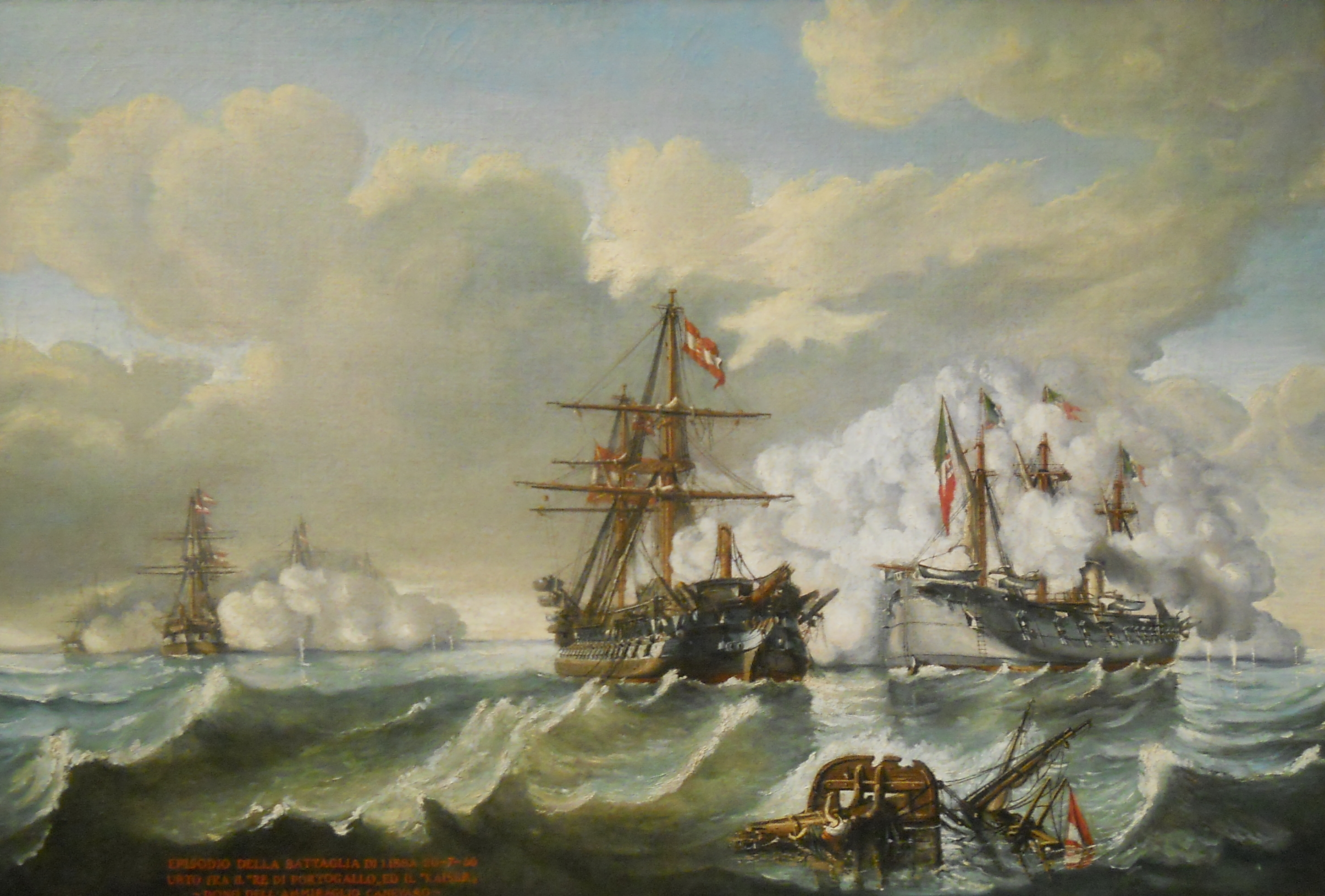
SMS Kaiser (center) disengaging from Re di Portogallo (right) after their collision

Re di Portogallo then came into view off the port bow and Commodore Petz aboard Kaiser was determined to ram it despite his wooden ship. Petz dropped slightly to starboard and with a sharp turn to port he managed to hit his opponent abeam. The Kaiser grazed along the side of the Re di Portogallo, shattering part of its armor, the crane beams, tearing all the port side port portlights and the shrouds of the foremast in two. Kaiser itself suffered equally severe damage. The bowsprit and the stay were torn away and the foremast crashed over the side onto the funnel. Despite her condition and the Italian gunfire, Kaiser was able to fire at least two concentrated broadsides at close range, causing so much damage above and below the waterline that the Re di Portogallo subsequently drifted away and was lost in the smoke of battle.

While the badly-battered Kaiser, with her rigging on fire and many gunners killed or wounded, sailed on, Affondatore emerged from the smoke, steaming on a course that crossed that of the Kaiser at right angles. The Affondatore approached as if to ram the ship. But when collision was imminent, Persano suddenly gave the order to take evasive action, possibly fearing that Affondatore's ramming spike would get caught in the hull of the Kaiser and his own ship would go down with the enemy.

In the meantime, Tegetthoff attacked Persano's division. All seven Austrian armored ships concentrated on Re d'Italia, Palestro and San Martino. The battle had now developed into a dense mêlée that allowed each combatant only a brief glimpse of the other through the thick smoke. The Austrian ships were painted black, while the Italians were painted light gray. In addition, the Austrians had painted the funnels of the ships different colors so that they could easily identify their own armored ships. Tegetthoff's order was clear: "Ram everything that is gray!". The hard-pressed Italian center was now attacked from the front, flanks and rear. The Palestro and San Martino were hit multiple times by Austrian guns, whereupon they withdrew to the north and south-west after several hits.

Meanwhile, the battle reached its climax. As the Austrians encircled Re d'Italia, an Austrian shot hit her sternpost and tore away the rudder, rendering her virtually helpless. Tegetthoff ordered Ferdinand Max to ram the Italian ship at full speed. Re d'Italia heeled heavily to starboard when she was hit, immediately began to take on water and sank within three minutes. While the Austrians attempted to launch some boats to rescue the Italian crew, the ships of the Italian vanguard and rearguard arrived, forcing the Austrians to withdraw. The loss of the Re d'Italia and the withdrawal of the Palestro reduced the Italian armored squadron to nine ships. Nevertheless, Persano was determined to continue fighting. Ancona and Varese were preparing for a new attack on Petz's division when they collided with each other and remained wedged for several minutes. During these minutes, the Austrians were able to escape.

The losses aboard Kaiser were heavy, as one of Affondatore's 300-pound shells had hit the hull of the ship, killing or wounding twenty men. In total, she had suffered twenty-four dead and seventy-five wounded. But Kaiser was not yet out of danger, as Maria Pia now appeared and opened fire from a distance of 874 yards. Kaiser tried to return fire, but many of the guns were disabled, while the fire spread through the rigging to the entire ship. The steam ran out and the steering gear was damaged. The other wooden ships had also been badly damaged. One ship was only kept afloat by the pumps, another was on fire, and the crew of the guns on another had been decimated. Petz withdrew his division from the operation and headed for San Georgio. Nevertheless, the Kaiser had proven that even a wooden ship could attack an ironclad and escape destruction.

By 12:20 the two fleets had separated and the Austrian ironclads moved toward San Georgio in support of their unarmored ships. After the Italian fleet had regrouped, Persano formed them into three columns to the northeast, between the Austrian armored ships and the land, with his own armored ship column to seaward. Halfway through, when the gun smoke had cleared, Persano saw that Albini's division was still on the coast, while his armored ships were in column to the west. Persano then gave the signal for general pursuit. However, as his captains did not know that Persano was now aboard Affondatore, they paid no attention to his signals.

Persano was now losing track of events, as he repeatedly sent out contradictory flag signals such as: The fleet should chase the enemy. The commander wants the orders given to be carried out quickly, any ship that is not fighting is not at its post. He then learned by signals that Re d'Italia had sunk, Palestro was doomed by fire and San Martino was almost incapable of fighting. Together with his wooden ships and the Terribile, Persano put his division in the lead and steamed west. The two fleets watched each other until nightfall, with the Italians zigzagging but keeping their distance from the Austrian fleet. At dusk, Persano set course for Ancona and Tegetthoff for Pula.

== Aftermath ==
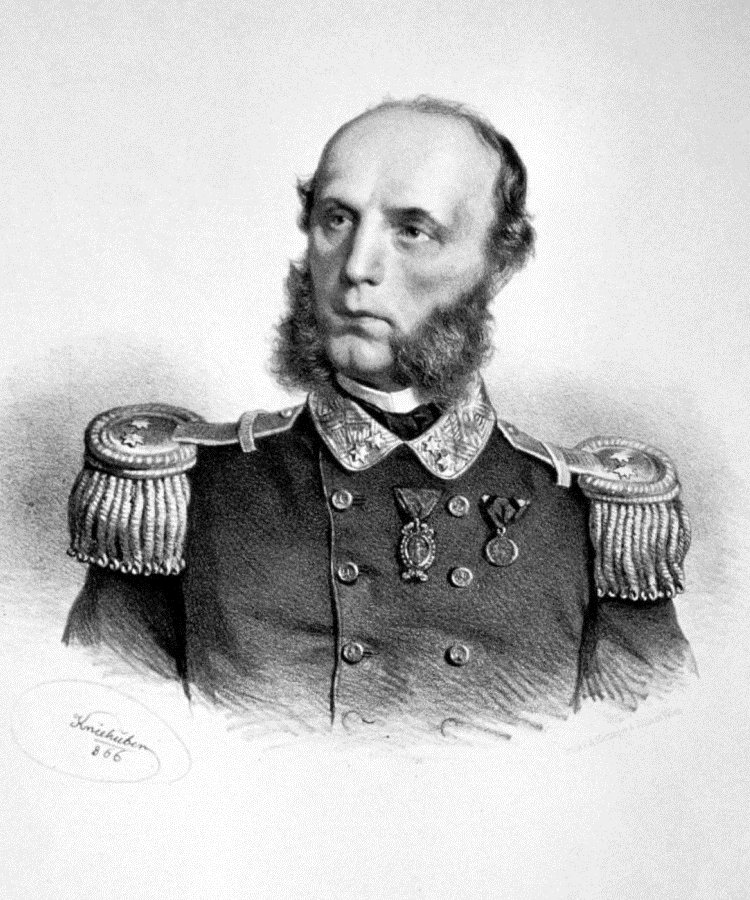
Portrait of Tegetthoff made five years after the battle

That same evening, Tegetthoff sent a telegram to Vienna: "This morning near Lissa, encountered the enemy fleet. After a two-hour battle, drove the enemy away. Lissa relieved."

The decisive factors in the Italian defeat were the scattered starting positions of their ships during the landing operations, the disorganized command caused by disputes and misunderstandings, Persano's change of flagship, the gap in their formation that this caused, and the hesitant counterattack after the Austrians had breached the gap. The Austrian fleet was able to win the battle because orders were issued without delay, the battle plan was well-prepared and carefully thought out, and, above all, their crews were exceptionally well-trained. A significant part of the success was also due to Tegetthoff's determined and unconventional approach.

The Battle of Lissa was the first naval engagement in European warfare to feature the use of ironclad warships. However, too much emphasis was placed on ramming tactics during the battle. The Austrians attacked a fleet that was completely disorganized, giving them the best opportunities to employ the ram. Even so, they succeeded in sinking only one ship using this weapon. With the development of even more powerful and longer-range cannons, which could sink ships before they came close enough to ram, this tactic soon became obsolete. While the Italians had a numerically superior and technically more advanced fleet compared to the Austrians, they were unable to capitalize on this advantage.

For Italy, the defeat was a national tragedy. Admiral Persano was removed from his post and dishonorably dismissed from naval service. Tegetthoff, on the other hand, was promoted to vice admiral by Emperor Franz Joseph for his efforts. Shortly thereafter, he was also awarded the Military Order of Maria Theresa with Commanders' Cross. In Vienna and numerous other cities of the empire, he was declared an honorary citizen. Additionally, a congratulatory letter from his former superior, Ferdinand Maximilian, now Emperor of Mexico, reached him.

The Italians lost 38 officers and 574 sailors killed, four officers and 32 sailors wounded and 19 men captured. In contrast, the Austrians only suffered casualties of three officers and 35 sailors killed and 15 officers and 123 sailors wounded. Some foreign newspapers incorrectly reported that Kaiser had also been sunk. The badly-damaged Affondatore later sank off Ancona, but was refloated and rebuilt.
