= Carlo Pellion di Persano =

Italian naval officer and politician (1806–1883)

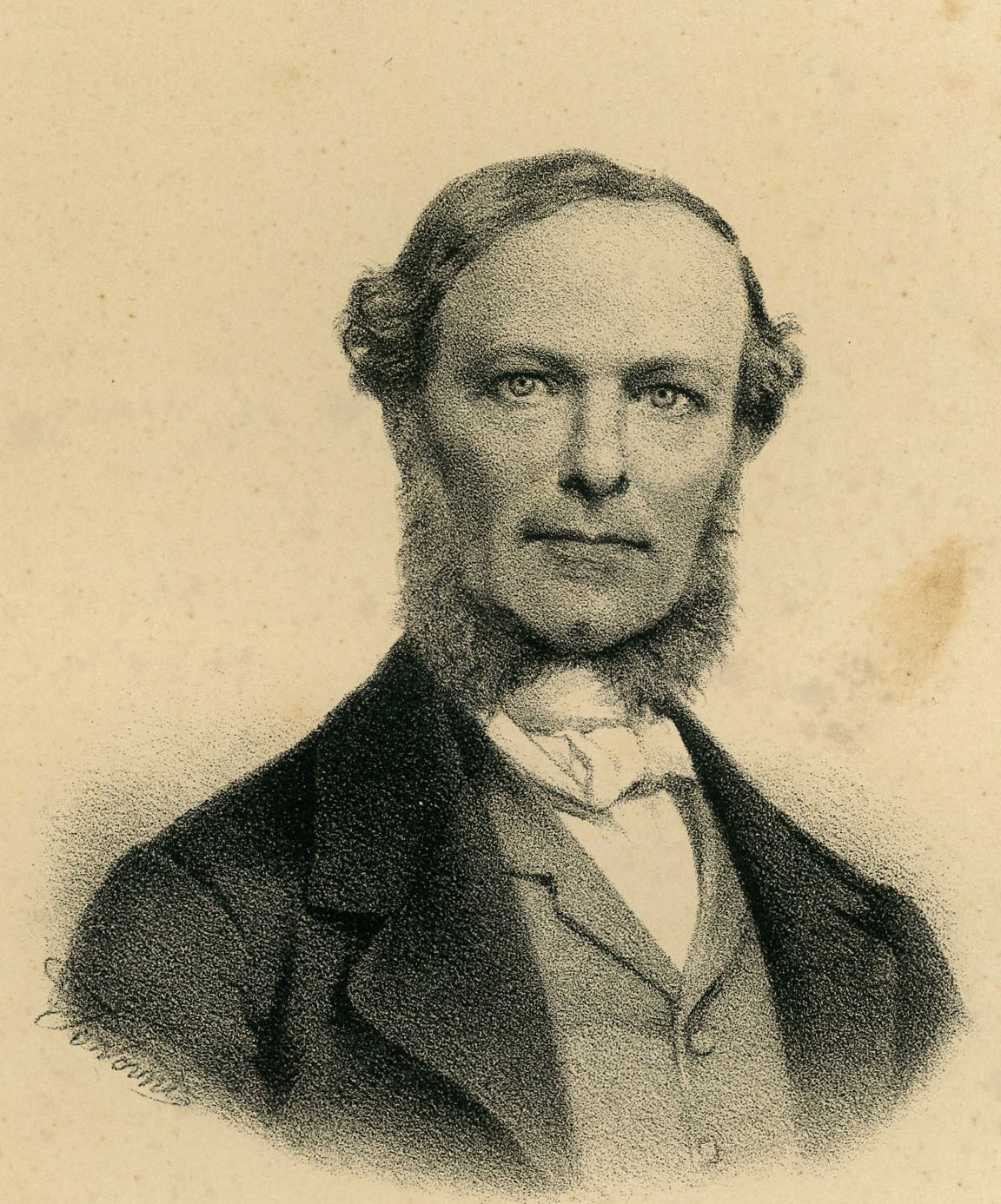
- 1864 portrait of Persano
- Born: 11 March 1806; Vercelli, Sésia
- Died: 28 July 1883 (aged 77) Turin, Italy
- Allegiance: Sardinia; Italy
- Branch: Royal Sardinian Navy; Regia Marina
- Rank: Admiral
- Conflicts: Third Italian War of Independence: Battle of Lissa (1866)

Admiral Carlo Pellion di Persano (11 March 1806 – 28 July 1883) was an Italian naval officer and politician best known for commanding the Regia Marina fleet which was defeated in the 1866 Battle of Lissa during the Third Italian War of Independence. Persano was born in Vercelli, Sésia on 11 March 1806. He joined the Royal Sardinian Navy as a young man and advanced rapidly through the ranks. Persano commanded the Sardinian navy from 1860 to 1861, and saw action during the unification of Italy. Following the unification, he was appointed as the Minister of the Navy of the Kingdom of Italy in 1862 and was elected to the Senate of the Kingdom of Italy in 1865.

Persano was appointed to command the Italian navy during the Third Italian War of Independence. Despite having serious misgivings about the poor state of his ships and their crews, he set sail and suffered a defeat off the island of Lissa at the hands of an Austrian Navy fleet under Vice-admiral Wilhelm von Tegetthoff. To quell the public outcry in Italy after the defeats at Lissa and Custoza, Persano was judged by the Italian Senate, which alone had the authority to judge a sitting senator. He was condemned for incompetence on 15 April 1867 and dismissed from the navy. Persano died in Turin on 28 July 1883.
