= Kaiser Max-class ironclad =

Kaiser Max-class ironclad may refer to:

- Kaiser Max-class ironclad (1862), group of three broadside ironclads built in the early 1860s
- Kaiser Max-class ironclad (1875), group of three casemate ships built in the 1870s
