= Tegetthoff =

Tegetthoff may refer to:

- Wilhelm von Tegetthoff, an Austrian admiral
- SMS Tegetthoff (1878), a central battery ironclad
- Tegetthoff-class battleship, an Austro-Hungarian dreadnought class
  - SMS Tegetthoff (1912), the lead ship in the class
- Admiral Tegetthoff - main ship of Austro-Hungarian North Pole expedition
