= SMS Prinz Eugen (1877) =

Austro-Hungarian Navy ironclad warship

- Prinz Eugen in her original configuration

History

Austro-Hungarian Empire
- Name: Prinz Eugen
- Namesake: Prince Eugene of Savoy
- Builder: Pola Navy Yard, Pola
- Laid down: October 1874
- Launched: 7 September 1877
- Commissioned: November 1878
- Stricken: 30 December 1912
- Fate: Confiscated by Italy, 1919, fate unknown

General characteristics
- Class & type: Kaiser Max class
- Displacement: 3,548 long tons (3,605 t)
- Length: 75.87 m (248 ft 11 in) o/a; 73.23 m (240 ft 3 in) lwl
- Beam: 15.25 m (50 ft)
- Draft: 6.15 m (20 ft 2 in)
- Installed power: 2,755 ihp (2,054 kW)
- Propulsion: 1 × marine steam engine; 1 × screw propeller
- Speed: 13.28 knots (24.59 km/h; 15.28 mph)
- Crew: 400
- Armament: 8 × 21 cm (8.3 in) guns; 4 × 9 cm (3.5 in) guns; 2 × 7 cm (2.8 in) guns; 6 × 47 mm (1.9 in) QF guns; 3 × 47 mm (1.9 in) Hotchkiss revolver cannon; 2 × 25 mm (0.98 in) guns; 4 × 35 cm (13.8 in) torpedo tubes
- Armor: Belt: 203 mm (8 in); Casemate: 125 mm (4.9 in)

SMS Prinz Eugen was an ironclad warship built for the Austro-Hungarian Navy in the 1870s, the third and final member of the Kaiser Max class. The ship was supposedly the same vessel that had been laid down in 1861, and had simply been reconstructed. In reality, the head of the Austro-Hungarian Navy could not secure funding for new ships, but reconstruction projects were uncontroversial, so he "rebuilt" the three earlier Kaiser Max-class ironclads. Only the engines and parts of the armor plate were reused in the new Prinz Eugen, which was laid down in October 1874, launched in September 1877, and commissioned in November 1878. The ship spent significant periods out of service, in part due to slender naval budgets that prevented much active use. In 1880, she took part in an international naval demonstration against the Ottoman Empire, and she went to Spain in 1888 for the Barcelona Universal Exposition. Prinz Eugen was stricken in 1904 and converted into a repair ship in 1906–1909. She was renamed Vulkan and served in this capacity through World War I; after the war, she was seized by Italy but was awarded to Yugoslavia in the postwar peace negotiations. Italy refused to hand the ship over, however, and her ultimate fate is unknown.

== Design ==
Prinz Eugen underway c. 1887

Faced with perennial refusal from the Austro-Hungarian parliaments to provide funding for new ironclad warships, the chief of the Austro-Hungarian Navy, Friedrich von Pöck, resorted to subterfuge to acquire the needed vessels. He proposed "rebuilding" the existing three Kaiser Max-class ironclads, since such maintenance costs were easier to secure approval. In reality, the three old broadside ironclads were dismantled and three, larger central-battery ships were constructed. To complete the deception, the ships' names were carried over, and some materials from the old ships were incorporated into the new vessels.

Prinz Eugen was 75.87 meters (248 ft 11 in) long overall and 73.23 m (240 ft 3 in) long at the waterline; she had a beam of 15.25 m (50 ft) and an average draft of 6.15 m (20 ft 2 in). She displaced 3,548 long tons (3,605 t). As was common for ironclads of the period, she had a pronounced ram bow. She had a crew of 400 officers and men.

Her propulsion system consisted of one single-expansion marine steam engine that drove a single screw propeller. The number and type of her coal-fired boilers have not survived, but they were vented through a single funnel placed slightly forward of amidships. Her engine produced a top speed of 13.28 knots (24.59 km/h; 15.28 mph) from 2,755 indicated horsepower (2,054 kW). The ship was fitted with a three-masted sailing rig to supplement the steam engines.

Prinz Eugen was a casemate ship, and she was armed with a main battery of eight 21-centimeter (8.3 in) 20-caliber (cal.) guns manufactured by Krupp, mounted in a central casemate, four on each broadside. She also carried four 9 cm (3.5 in) 24-cal. guns, two 7 cm (2.8 in) 15-cal. landing guns, six 47 mm (1.9 in) 35-cal. quick-firing guns, three 47 mm (1.9 in) Hotchkiss revolver cannon, and two 25 mm (0.98 in) guns. Prinz Eugen also had four 35 cm (13.8 in) torpedo tubes, one in the bow, one in the stern, and one on each broadside.

The ship's armor consisted of an armored belt that was 203 mm (8 in) thick and was capped with 115 mm (4.5 in) thick transverse bulkheads on either end of the citadel. The casemate battery was protected with 125 mm (4.9 in) thick plates.

== Service history ==
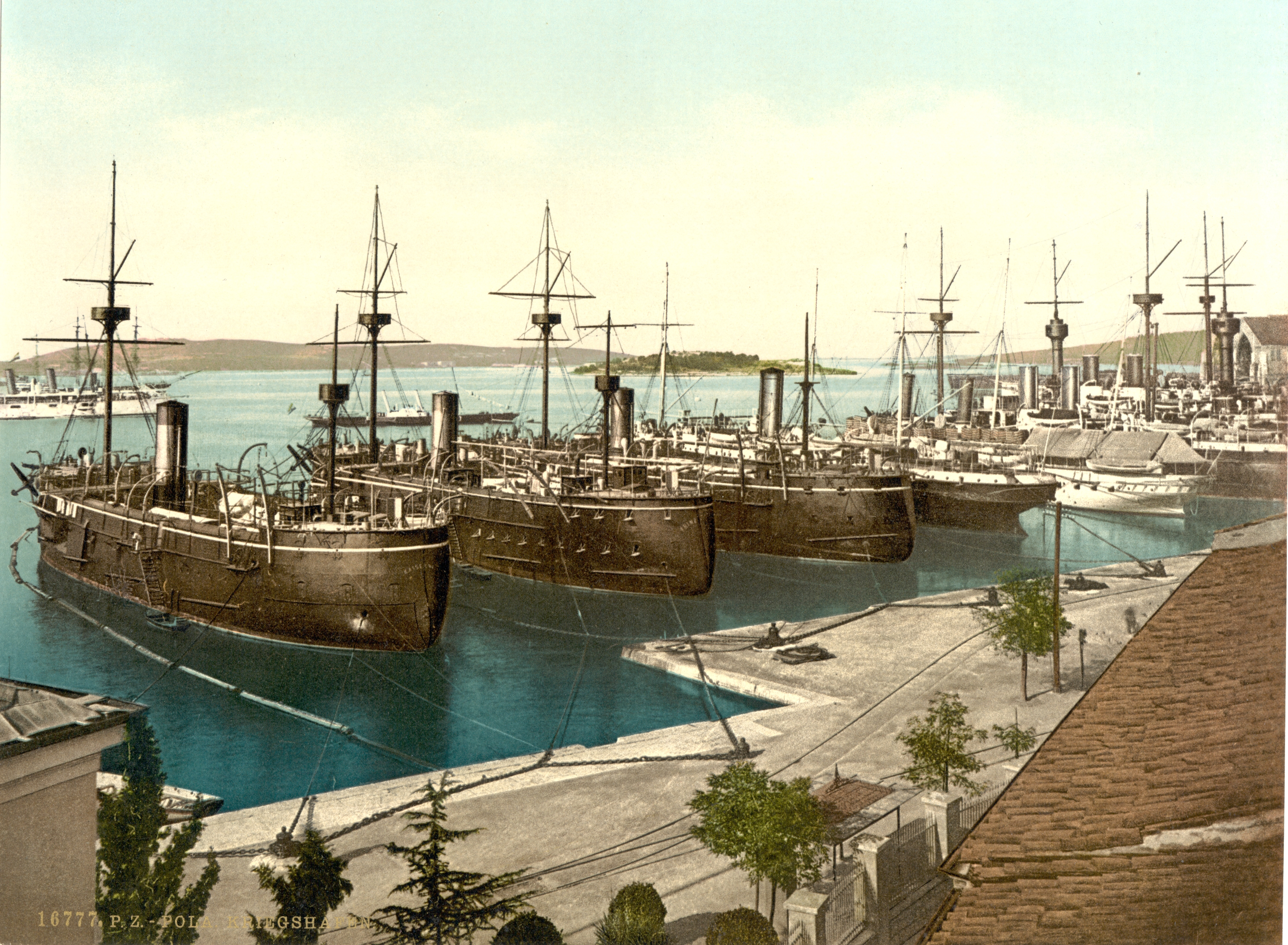
Kaiser Max (left), Prinz Eugen (center), and Don Juan d'Austria (right) in Pola

Prinz Eugen was laid down at the Pola Navy Yard in Pola in October 1874. The ship was ostensibly the same vessel that had been laid down in 1861, as the Austro-Hungarian parliament had approved a so-called reconstruction program of that Prinz Eugen. The head of the Austro-Hungarian Navy, Vice Admiral Friedrich von Pöck, had resorted to subterfuge to circumvent parliamentary hostility to new ironclad construction; he requested funds to modernize the earlier vessel, but in fact, he had that vessel broken up, with only the machinery, parts of the armor plate, and other miscellaneous equipment being incorporated into the new ship. Her completed hull was launched on 7 September 1877 and fitting-out work was completed by November 1878, when she was commissioned into the fleet. Sea trials began on 9 November.

The government placed a low priority on naval activities, particularly in the 1870s; as a result, the shortage of funds precluded an active fleet policy. The ironclad fleet, including Prinz Eugen, was kept out of service in Pola, laid up in reserve; the only vessels to see significant service in the 1870s were several screw frigates sent abroad. In 1880, Prinz Eugen had her sailing rig reduced. That year, Prinz Eugen, the ironclad Custoza, and the unarmored frigate Laudon took part in an international naval demonstration against the Ottoman Empire to force the Ottomans to transfer the city of Ulcinj to Montenegro in accordance with the terms of the 1878 Congress of Berlin. From 6 June to 11 July 1887, Prinz Eugen served as the flagship of the summer training squadron. During this period, Prinz Eugen was present during a fleet review held for Kaiser Franz Josef I on 4 July.

In 1888, Prinz Eugen and an Austro-Hungarian squadron that included the ironclads Custoza, Tegetthoff, Don Juan d'Austria, and Kaiser Max and the torpedo cruisers Panther and Leopard traveled to Barcelona, Spain, to take part in the opening ceremonies for the Barcelona Universal Exposition. This was the largest squadron of the Austro-Hungarian Navy that had operated outside the Adriatic. The same year, she participated in the annual fleet maneuvers in 1888, along with the ironclads Don Juan d'Austria, Custoza, Kaiser Max, and Tegetthoff, and the cruisers Panther, Leopard, and Meteor, under the command of Rear Admiral Manfroni von Manfort. In June and July 1889, Prinz Eugen participated in fleet training exercises, which also included the ironclads Custoza, Erzherzog Albrecht, Tegetthoff, Kaiser Max, and Don Juan d'Austria. She took part in the exercises held in May and June 1891. Prinz Eugen was mobilized during the 1893 fleet maneuvers to train alongside the ironclads Kronprinz Erzherzog Rudolf, Kronprinzessin Erzherzogin Stephanie, Kaiser Max, and Don Juan d'Austria, among other vessels.

A new construction program in the late 1890s and early 1900s required the Austro-Hungarian Navy to discard old, obsolete vessels to reduce annual budgets. These ships were largely reused in secondary roles. On 30 December 1904, Prinz Eugen was stricken from the naval register and converted into a repair ship. Conversion work was begun in 1906, which included removing her armament and engines and the installation of a crane that had been removed from the pre-dreadnought battleship Erzherzog Friedrich. She was re-commissioned on 31 July 1909 with the new name Vulkan, as her previous name was needed for Prinz Eugen, a new dreadnought battleship. On 16 June 1910, the protected cruiser Zenta towed Vulkan to Šibenik, where she was based for the rest of her career through World War I. After Austria-Hungary's defeat, the ship was seized by Italy in 1919 as a war prize. The postwar negotiations that followed the Treaty of Saint-Germain-en-Laye, which allocated the ships of the former Austro-Hungarian Navy to the Allies, awarded the ship to Yugoslavia, but Italy never transferred the ship. Her ultimate fate is unknown.
