= SMS Laudon =

- Laudon in 1895

History
- Name: Laudon
- Builder: Stabilimento Tecnico Triestino, Trieste
- Laid down: August 1871
- Launched: 20 September 1873
- Completed: 22 July 1874

General characteristics
- Class & type: Radetzky-class frigate
- Displacement: 3,956 long tons (4,019 t)
- Length: 79.1 m (259 ft 6 in)
- Beam: 14.33 m (47 ft)
- Draft: 7 m (23 ft)
- Installed power: 2,500 ihp (1,900 kW)
- Propulsion: 1 × marine steam engine; 1 × screw propeller
- Speed: 13.2 knots (24.4 km/h; 15.2 mph)
- Complement: 450
- Armament: 15 × 15 cm (5.9 in) guns; 2 × 7 cm (2.8 in) guns; 4 × 47 mm (1.9 in) quick-firing guns; 3 × 47 mm (1.9 in) autocannon; 3 × 35 cm (13.8 in) torpedo tubes

SMS Laudon was the second Radetzky class of screw frigates, which were built for the Austro-Hungarian Navy in the 1870s.

== Design ==
In the immediate aftermath of the Austro-Prussian War of 1866, Admiral Wilhelm von Tegetthoff had become the commander of the Austro-Hungarian Navy. In the late 1860s and early 1870s, he pushed for a significant expansion of the fleet, and in 1871, secured funding for the construction of two new screw frigates, among other new vessels. These frigates became the Radetzky class.

Laudon was 79.1 m (259 ft 6 in) long overall, and she had a beam of 14.33 m (47 ft) and a draft of 7 m (23 ft). The ship had a displacement of 3,956 long tons (4,019 t) at full load. The ship had an iron frame with a wooden hull. Her crew numbered 450 officers and enlisted sailors.

The ship was powered by a single 2-cylinder marine steam engine that drove a screw propeller. The number and type of boilers is not known, but smoke from the boilers was vented through a single funnel located forward of amidships, between the fore- and main mast. The propulsion system was capable of generating 2,500 indicated horsepower (1,900 kW), for a top speed of 13.2 knots (24.4 km/h; 15.2 mph). The ship was fitted with a three-masted sailing rig to supplement the steam engine on long voyages.

Laudon was armed with a main battery of fifteen 15 cm (5.9 in) RK 26-caliber guns manufactured by Krupp. She also carried a light battery that consisted of two 7 cm (2.8 in), 15-caliber guns, four 47 mm (1.9 in) quick-firing guns, and three 47 mm autocannon. In addition, she was fitted with three 35 cm (13.8 in) torpedo tubes; one was in the stern, and one on each broadside.

== Service history ==
The keel for Laudon was laid down at the Stabilimento Tecnico Triestino shipyard in Trieste in August 1871. She was launched on 20 September 1873 and was completed on 22 July 1874. By the time the ship entered service, Admiral Friedrich von Pöck—Tegetthoff's successor—had instituted a policy of keeping very few ships in commission to keep operating costs to an absolute minimum. The Spanish Navy offered to buy Radetzky and Laudon in 1879, but Pöck rejected the request. In 1880, Laudon and the ironclads Prinz Eugen and Custoza took part in an international naval demonstration against the Ottoman Empire to force the Ottomans to transfer the city of Ulcinj to Montenegro in accordance with the terms of the 1878 Congress of Berlin. Late in 1881, Laudon, the ironclad Erzherzog Albrecht, and several smaller vessels were sent to Cattaro Bay to help suppress a revolt there. During the operations, which concluded in March 1882, the ships bombarded rebel positions in the area. During the fighting, then-Lieutenant Leodegar Kneissler led a landing party from Laudon that engaged rebel forces ashore.

Following Pöck's replacement by Admiral Maximilian Daublebsky von Sterneck in 1884, the fleet took a more active role; for much of each year's training cycle, either Laudon or Radetzky would lead a division of a few unarmored vessels for operations in home waters. These cruises continued as late as the winter of 1896–1897, when Laudon once again led the division.

Laudon had her propulsion system removed in 1900, and she became a stationary training ship. She was also renamed Schwarzenberg at that time. She remained in the fleet's inventory through World War I, and in the postwar settlement, she was transferred to the Royal Yugoslav Navy in 1919, where she was renamed Prvi. Later that year, Italy seized the ship, towed it back to Italy, and broke her up in 1923.
