= SMS Kaiser Max (1875) =

Austro-Hungarian Navy ironclad warship

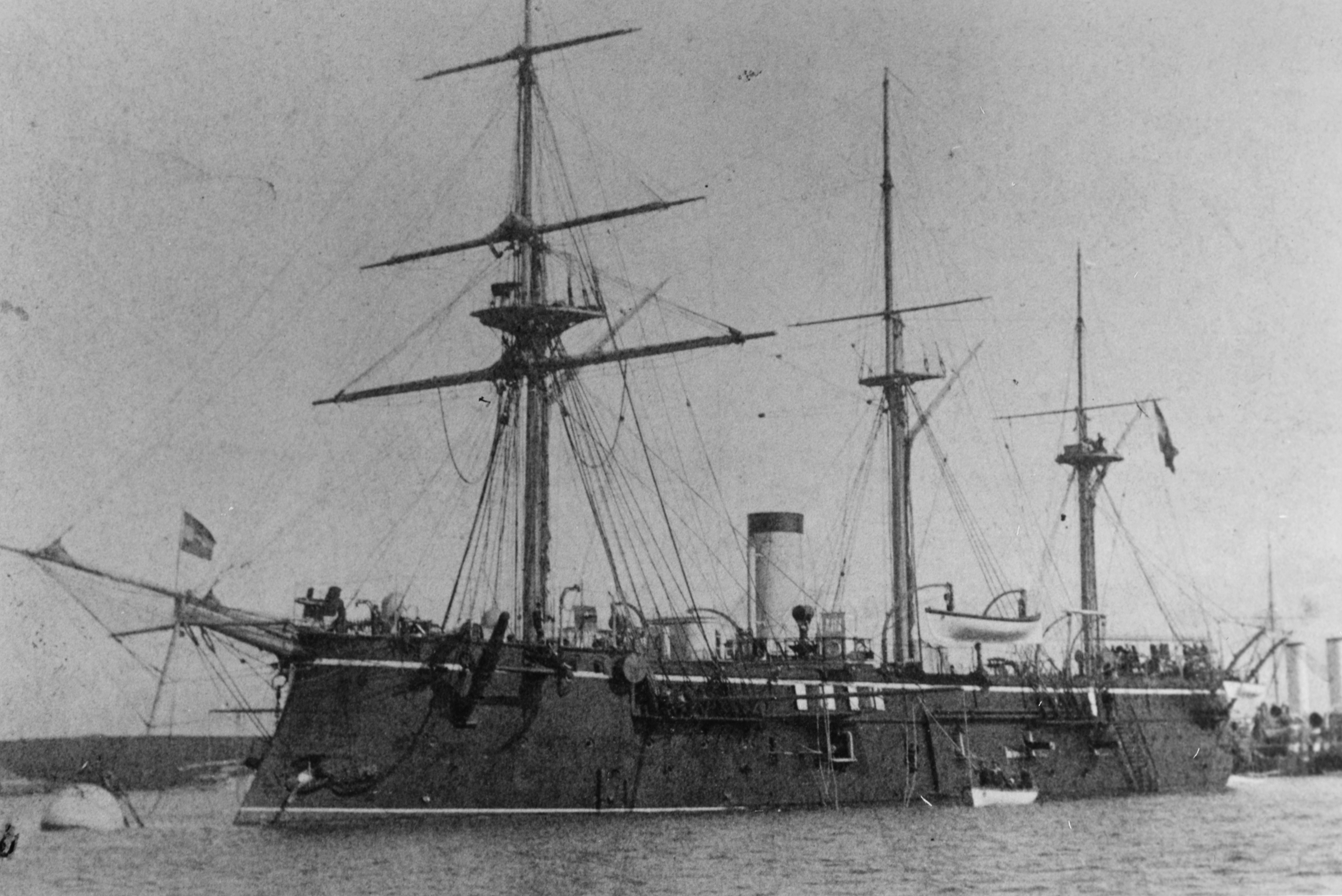
- Kaiser Max c. 1880–1889

History

Austro-Hungarian Empire
- Name: Kaiser Max
- Builder: Stabilimento Tecnico Triestino
- Laid down: 14 February 1874
- Launched: 28 December 1875
- Commissioned: 26 October 1876
- Stricken: 30 December 1904
- Fate: Ceded to Yugoslavia, 1920

History

Kingdom of Yugoslavia
- Name: Tivat
- Acquired: 1920
- Fate: Unknown

General characteristics
- Class & type: Kaiser Max class
- Displacement: 3,548 long tons (3,605 t)
- Length: 75.87 m (248 ft 11 in) o/a; 73.23 m (240 ft 3 in) lwl
- Beam: 15.25 m (50 ft)
- Draft: 6.15 m (20 ft 2 in)
- Installed power: 2,755 ihp (2,054 kW)
- Propulsion: 1 × marine steam engine; 1 × screw propeller
- Speed: 13.28 knots (24.59 km/h; 15.28 mph)
- Crew: 400
- Armament: 8 × 21 cm (8.3 in) guns; 4 × 9 cm (3.5 in) guns; 2 × 7 cm (2.8 in) guns; 6 × 47 mm (1.9 in) QF guns; 3 × 47 mm (1.9 in) Hotchkiss revolver cannon; 2 × 25 mm (0.98 in) guns; 4 × 35 cm (13.8 in) torpedo tubes
- Armor: Belt: 203 mm (8 in); Casemate: 125 mm (4.9 in)

SMS Kaiser Max was an ironclad warship built for the Austro-Hungarian Navy in the 1870s, the lead ship of the Kaiser Max class. The ship was purportedly the same vessel that had been laid down in 1861, and had simply been reconstructed. This was a fiction, however; the head of the Austro-Hungarian Navy could not secure funding for new ships, but reconstruction projects were uncontroversial, so he "rebuilt" the three earlier Kaiser Max-class ironclads. Only the engines and parts of the armor plate were reused in the new Kaiser Max, which was laid down in February 1874, launched in December 1875, and commissioned in October 1876. The ship's career was fairly limited, in part due to slender naval budgets that prevented much active use. She made foreign visits and took part in limited training exercises in the 1880s and 1890s. Long since obsolete, Kaiser Max was removed from service in 1904 and converted into a barracks ship. After World War I, the ship was transferred to the Royal Yugoslav Navy as a war prize and renamed Tivat. Her fate thereafter is uncertain, either being sold for scrap in 1924 or retained through 1941.

== Design ==
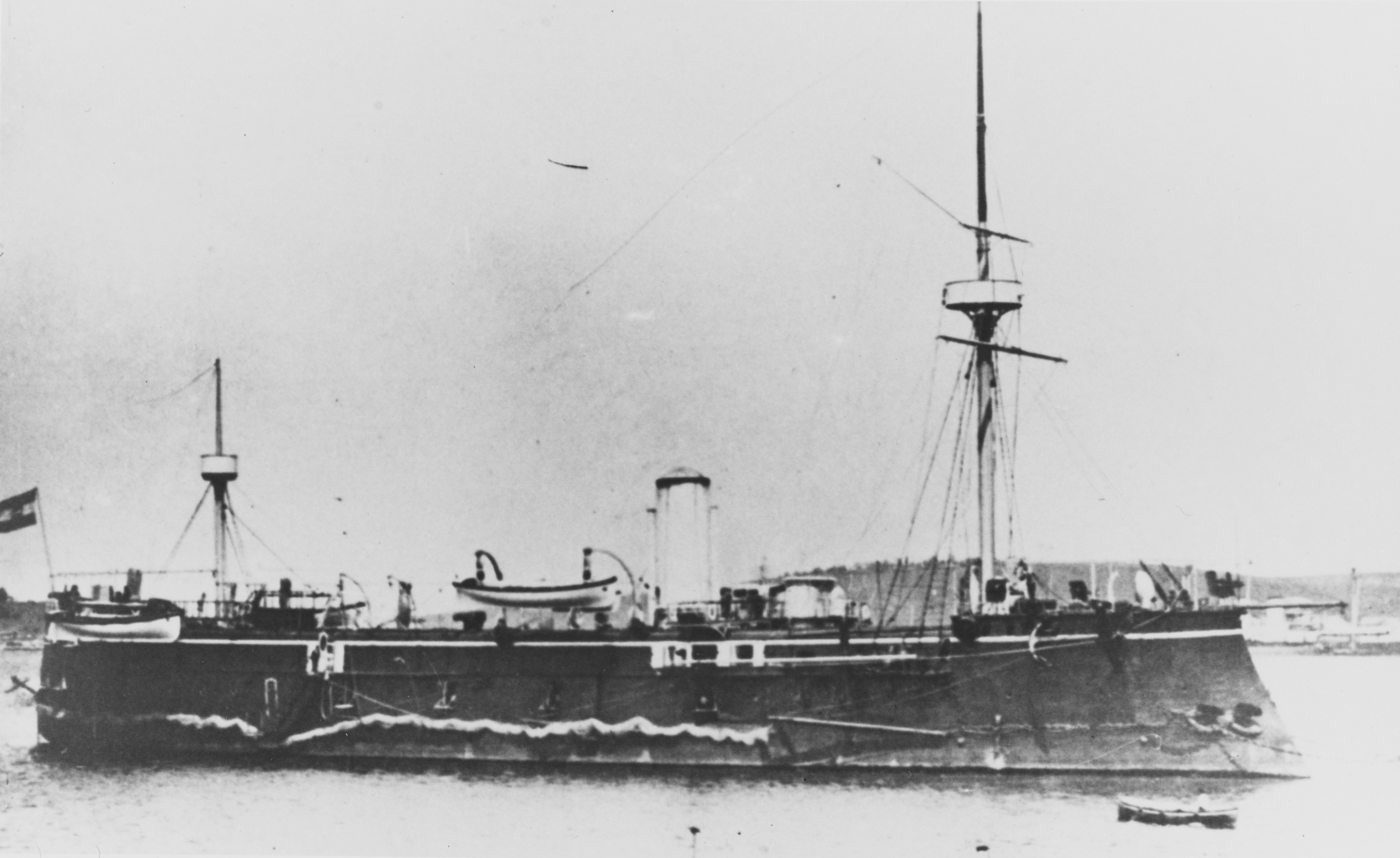
Kaiser Max sometime after 1892

Faced with perennial refusal from the Austro-Hungarian parliaments to provide funding for new ironclad warships, the chief of the Austro-Hungarian Navy, Friedrich von Pöck, resorted to subterfuge to acquire the needed vessels. He proposed "rebuilding" the existing three Kaiser Max-class ironclads, since such maintenance costs were easier to secure approval. In reality, the three old broadside ironclads were dismantled and three, larger central-battery ships were constructed. To complete the deception, the ships' names were carried over, and some materials from the old ships were incorporated into the new vessels.

Kaiser Max was 75.87 meters (248 ft 11 in) long overall and 73.23 m (240 ft 3 in) long at the waterline; she had a beam of 15.25 m (50 ft) and an average draft of 6.15 m (20 ft 2 in). She displaced 3,548 long tons (3,605 t). As was common for ironclads of the period, she had a pronounced ram bow. She had a crew of 400 officers and enlisted men.

Her propulsion system consisted of one single-expansion marine steam engine that drove a single screw propeller. The number and type of her coal-fired boilers have not survived, but they were vented through a single funnel placed slightly forward of amidships. Her engine produced a top speed of 13.28 knots (24.59 km/h; 15.28 mph) from 2,755 indicated horsepower (2,054 kW). The ship was fitted with a three-masted sailing rig to supplement the steam engines.

Kaiser Max was a casemate ship, and she was armed with a main battery of eight 21-centimeter (8.3 in) 20-caliber (cal.) guns manufactured by Krupp mounted in a central casemate, four on each broadside. She also carried four 9 cm (3.5 in) 24-cal. guns, two 7 cm (2.8 in) 15-cal. landing guns, six 47 mm (1.9 in) 35-cal. quick-firing guns, three 47 mm (1.9 in) Hotchkiss revolver cannon, and two 25 mm (0.98 in) guns. Kaiser Max also had four 35 cm (13.8 in) torpedo tubes, one in the bow, one in the stern, and one on each broadside.

The ship's armor protection consisted of an armored belt that was 203 mm (8 in) thick and was capped with 115 mm (4.5 in) thick transverse bulkheads on either end of the citadel. The casemate battery was protected with 125 mm (4.9 in) thick plates.

== Service history ==
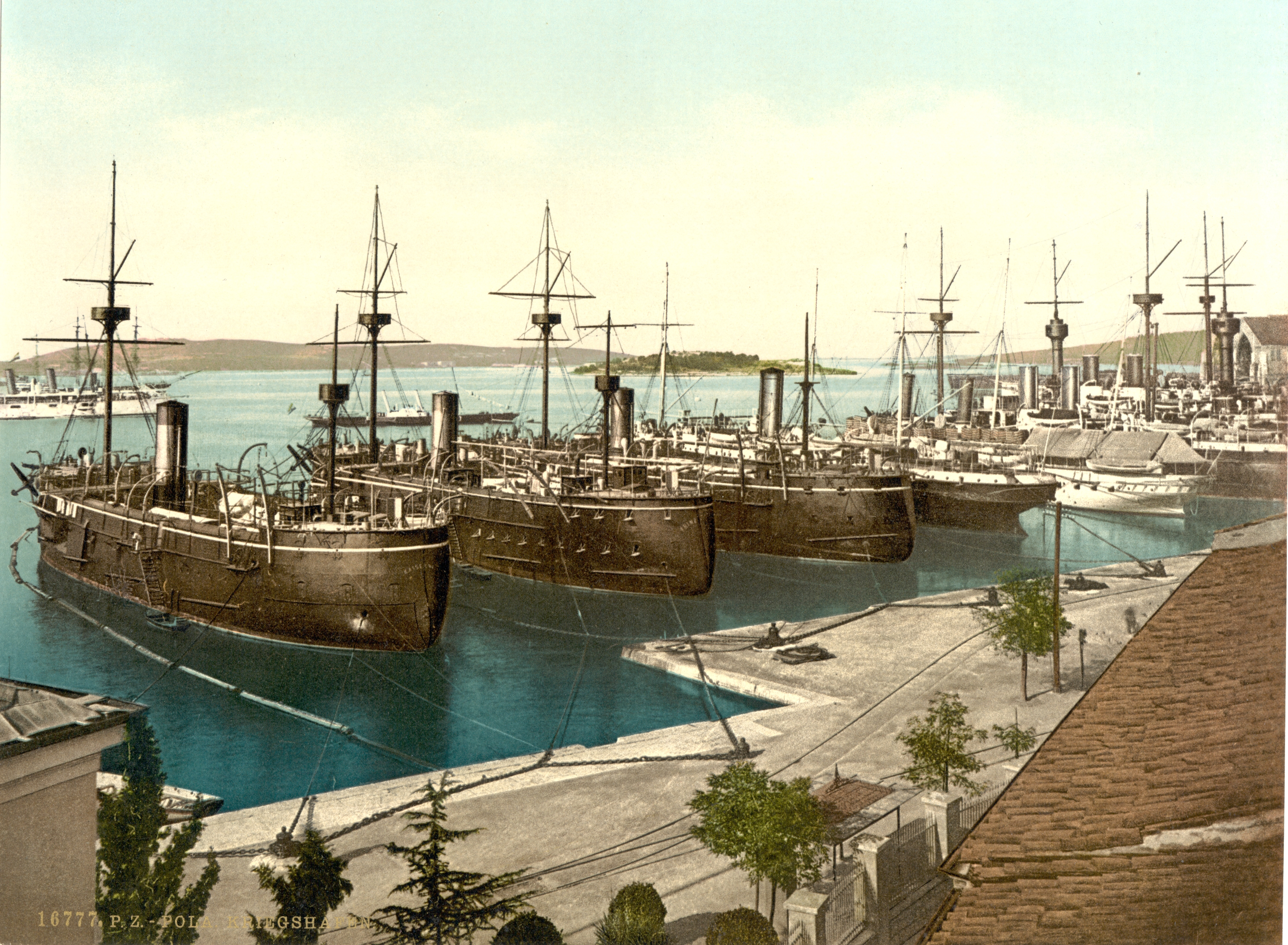
Kaiser Max (left), Prinz Eugen (center), and Don Juan d'Austria (right) in Pola

Kaiser Max was laid down at the Stabilimento Tecnico Triestino shipyard on 14 February 1874. The ship was ostensibly the same vessel that had been laid down in 1861, as the Austro-Hungarian parliament had approved a so-called reconstruction program of that Kaiser Max. The head of the Austro-Hungarian Navy, Vice Admiral Friedrich von Pöck, had resorted to subterfuge to circumvent parliamentary hostility to new ironclad construction; he requested funds to modernize the earlier vessel, but in fact, he had that vessel broken up, with only the machinery, parts of the armor plate, and other miscellaneous equipment being incorporated into the new ship. She was launched on 28 December 1875 and completed by 26 October 1876, when she was commissioned into the Austro-Hungarian fleet. The ship began her sea trials on 8 May 1877.

The government placed a low priority on naval activities, particularly in the 1870s; as a result, the shortage of funds precluded an active fleet policy. The ironclad fleet, including Kaiser Max, was kept out of service in Pola, laid up in reserve; the only vessels to see significant service in the 1870s were several screw frigates sent abroad. In 1880, Kaiser Max had her sailing rig reduced. In 1888, Kaiser Max and an Austro-Hungarian squadron that included the ironclads Custoza, Tegetthoff, Don Juan d'Austria, and Prinz Eugen and the torpedo cruisers Panther and Leopard traveled to Barcelona, Spain, to take part in the opening ceremonies for the Barcelona Universal Exposition. This was the largest squadron of the Austro-Hungarian Navy that had operated outside the Adriatic. The same year, Kaiser Max participated in the annual fleet maneuvers in 1888, along with the ironclads Don Juan d'Austria, Custoza, Prinz Eugen, and Tegetthoff, and the cruisers Panther, Leopard, and Meteor, under the command of Rear Admiral Manfroni von Manfort. In June and July 1889, Kaiser Max participated in fleet training exercises, which also included the ironclads Custoza, Erzherzog Albrecht, Tegetthoff, Prinz Eugen, and Don Juan d'Austria.

During the 1893 fleet maneuvers, Kaiser Max was mobilized to train alongside the ironclads Kronprinz Erzherzog Rudolf, Kronprinzessin Erzherzogin Stephanie, Prinz Eugen, and Don Juan d'Austria, among other vessels. A new construction program in the late 1890s and early 1900s required the Austro-Hungarian Navy to discard old, obsolete vessels to reduce annual budgets. These ships were largely reused in secondary roles. Kaiser Max was stricken from the naval register on 30 December 1904 and withdrawn from service. Between August and November 1906, Kaiser Max was used in underwater explosion tests under the direction of the naval engineer Siegfried Popper. Popper hoped the tests would allow him to design an effective underwater protection system for what would become the Radetzky-class battleships, but the experiments did not produce useful results. Kaiser Max was converted into a barracks ship in 1909 and was assigned to Cattaro Bay to serve the Arsenal Teodo, where she remained through World War I.

In 1920, having lost the war, the now-defunct Austro-Hungarian Empire ceded the ship to the newly formed Royal Yugoslav Navy. The ship's fate after entering Yugoslav service is unclear. She was renamed Tivat, according to Conway's All the World's Fighting Ships later became Neretva, serving through 1941; her ultimate fate after the Axis invasion of Yugoslavia in 1941 is unknown. According to the naval historian Milan Vego, however, the Yugoslav Navy sold the ship for scrap in 1924.
