= SMS Custoza =

Ironclad warship of the Austro-Hungarian Navy

- SMS Custoza

Class overview
- Preceded by: SMS Lissa
- Succeeded by: SMS Erzherzog Albrecht

History

Austro-Hungarian Empire
- Name: Custoza
- Namesake: Battle of Custoza
- Builder: Stabilimento Tecnico Triestino
- Laid down: 17 November 1869
- Launched: 20 August 1872
- Commissioned: February 1875
- Fate: Ceded to Italy, 1920, broken up

General characteristics
- Type: Casemate ship
- Displacement: 7,609 to 7,730.99 long tons (7,731.10 to 7,855.05 t)
- Length: 92.14 m (302 ft 4 in) p/p; 95.03 m (311 ft 9 in) o/a
- Beam: 17.7 m (58 ft 1 in)
- Draft: 7.9 m (25 ft 11 in)
- Installed power: 4,158 ihp (3,101 kW)
- Propulsion: 1 × marine steam engine; 1 × screw
- Speed: 13.75 knots (25.47 km/h; 15.82 mph)
- Crew: 548–567
- Armament: 8 × 26 cm RK L/22 guns; 6 × 9 cm (3.5 in) guns; 2 × 7 cm (2.8 in) guns
- Armor: Belt armor: 229 mm (9 in); Casemate: 152 to 178 mm (6 to 7 in)

SMS Custoza was an ironclad warship built for the Austro-Hungarian Navy in the 1870s, the only member of her class. She was the first Austro-Hungarian ironclad to be built after the navy studied the results of the Battle of Lissa of 1866; she was also the first iron-hulled capital ship to be built for the Austro-Hungarian Navy. She was laid down in November 1869, launched in August 1872, and completed in February 1875. Her career was fairly limited, in part due to reduced naval budgets in the 1870s that also delayed her completion. Custoza was somewhat more active in the 1880s, taking part in an international naval demonstration against the Ottoman Empire in 1880, being modernized in 1882, and a trip to Spain for the Barcelona Universal Exposition in 1888. The ship became a training ship in 1902, was converted into a barracks ship in 1914, and after World War I, was awarded as a war prize to Italy. Custoza was immediately broken up.

== Design ==
In 1869, the Austro-Hungarian navy asked its foremost naval designer, Chief Engineer Josef von Romako, who had designed all of the earlier ironclad vessels, to prepare designs for two new ironclads. The first became the Custoza, and the second became Erzherzog Albrecht, the latter built to a slightly smaller design owing to budgetary shortages. Romako had studied the Battle of Lissa, fought in 1866, and decided the new ships should favor heavy armor and the capability of end-on fire to allow it to effectively attack with its ram. This required compromises in the number of guns and the power of the ship's machinery; to make up for carrying fewer guns, Romako adopted the same casemate ship design adopted with the previous vessel, Lissa. Unlike the wooden-hulled Lissa, however, Custoza's hull would be constructed with iron, the first major Austro-Hungarian warship with an iron hull. Custoza was one of the largest casemate ships to be built by any navy.

Though she proved to be a fairly fast and maneuverable ship, Custoza was built to an obsolescent design, and did not meet the standards of other major navies in the period, which demanded greater armor protection and superior firepower. Italy, Austria-Hungary's rival across the Adriatic Sea laid down the two Duilio-class ironclads, very powerful turret ships carrying 450 mm (17.7 in) guns just four years after Custoza. Nevertheless, Custoza, along with the similar and contemporaneously built Erzherzog Albrecht, was the basis for the ironclad Tegetthoff, laid down in 1876. Abroad, Custoza's design influenced Nathaniel Barnaby, the British Chief Constructor, for his HMS Alexandra. And despite her shortcomings, particularly compared to the large Italian vessels, Custoza was the best capital ship in the Adriatic Sea at the time of her completion, owing to the very lengthy periods of construction for her Italian counterparts.

=== General characteristics and machinery ===
Illustration of Custoza under sail

Custoza was 92.14 meters (302 ft 4 in) long between perpendiculars and 95.03 m (311 ft 9 in) long overall. She had a beam of 17.7 m (58 ft 1 in) and an average draft of 7.9 m (25 ft 11 in). Her displacement ranged from 6,559.76 long tons (6,665.02 t) empty, to 7,175.95 long tons (7,291.10 t) normally, and up to 7,730.99 long tons (7,855.05 t) at full load. She had a transverse metacentric height of 0.85 m (2 ft 9 in). Her pronounced ram bow had an inverted slope up to the forecastle, which extended to the aft end of the central casemate.

The ship had a cellular double bottom that extended up the lower sides of the hull, up to the battery deck; it ran from frame 52 in the bow to frame 34 in the stern; on either ends, the sharp narrowing of the hull form prevented the double bottom from being extended further. The outer plating was 44 mm (1 3/4 in) thick, and reduced to 17 mm (11/16 in) and then to 19 mm (3/4 in) on the sides. Wooden bilge keels were fitted to protect the hull in case of an accidental grounding. She had a crew that ranged from 548 to 567 officers and enlisted men. The ship carried five anchors, two of which weighed 4,339 kg (9,566 lb); the other three were considerably smaller, ranging from 247 to 1,091 kg (545 to 2,405 lb).

Her propulsion system consisted of one single-expansion, horizontal, 2-cylinder steam engine that was manufactured by Stabilimento Tecnico Triestino (STT); the engines drove a single two-bladed-screw propeller that was 6.87 m (22.5 ft) in diameter. Steam was provided by eight coal-fired boilers with thirty-two fireboxes, which were trunked into a pair of funnels located amidships. She had a coal storage capacity of 606.8 long tons (616.5 t). To supplement the steam engine, Custoza was originally fitted with a full ship rig, but she was reduced to a schooner rig in 1877.

Her engine was rated to produce a top speed of 14 knots (26 km/h; 16 mph) from 1000 nominal horsepower. In service, she reached a maximum of 13.75 knots (25.47 km/h; 15.82 mph) from 4,158 indicated horsepower (3,101 kW), although on speed trials conducted on 12 February 1875 at a weight slightly under normal displacement, she reached a slightly higher speed of 13.95 knots (25.84 km/h; 16.05 mph). Over the course of her career, the ship slowed as its engine became worn. By 1883, when steaming at about normal displacement, she had lost about a knot of speed, being capable of just 12.7 knots (23.5 km/h; 14.6 mph) from 4,697 ihp (3,503 kW).

=== Armament and armor ===
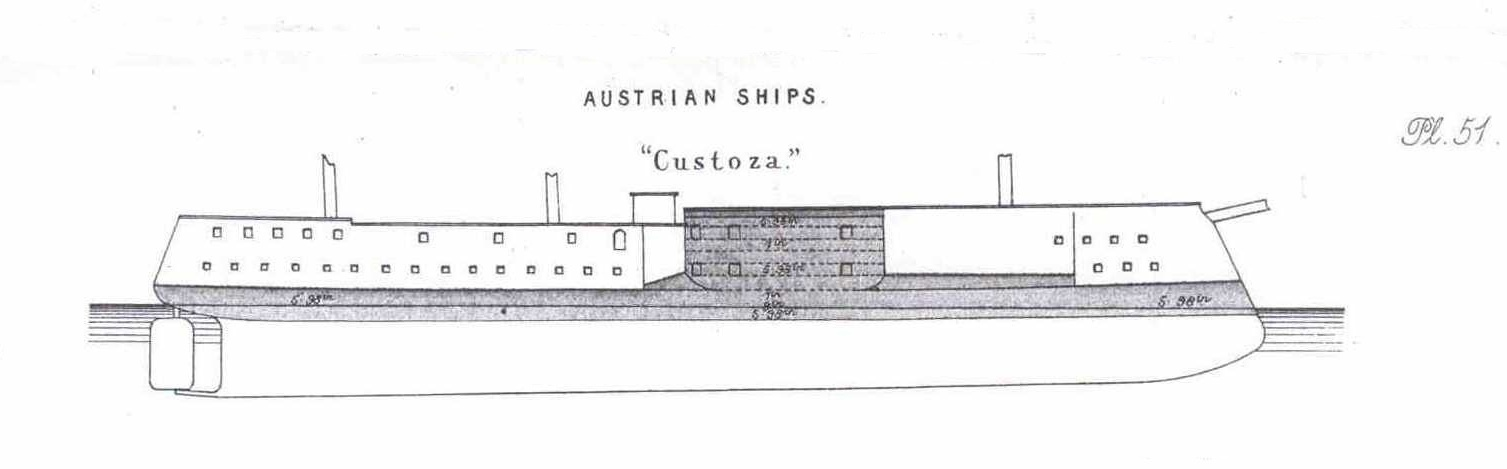
Line-drawing of Custoza; the shaded areas represent the portion of the ship protected by armor

Custoza was armed with a main battery of eight 26-centimeter (10.2 in) 22-caliber breech-loading guns manufactured by Krupp's Essen Works. These were mounted in a central, armored battery that had two stories, four guns apiece. The guns each had two gun ports available, which allowed four guns to fire ahead or on the broadside; only the upper two aft guns could fire astern. These guns had a range of elevation from -4° to +8.4° and firing arcs of 15° forward and aft through individual gun ports. They lacked rotating tables and had to be reoriented between the ports manually, an arduous task for the gun crews. She also carried several smaller guns, including six 9 cm (3.5 in) 24-caliber guns and two 7 cm (2.8 in) 15-caliber guns, all manufactured by Krupp. The 9 cm guns were placed in unarmored gun ports, two in the bow and four in the stern. The 9 cm guns had a range of elevation from -7° to +15°, and 21° firing arcs from their ports.

The ship's armored belt was placed on the waterline and was composed of wrought iron plate that was 229 mm (9 in) thick in the central portion of the ship, where it protected the ship's machinery spaces. Toward the bow and stern, the belt was reduced to 114 mm (4.5 in). The belt extended for 2.12 m (6 ft 11 in) above the waterline and 1.45 m (4 ft 9 in) below the line. The deck was protected with only a thin sheet of iron, as was customary for capital ships of the period. The main battery casemate had 152 to 178 mm (6 to 7 in) of iron plating. A major advantage casemate ships like Custoza had over broadside ironclads was the reduced weight of the smaller battery; Custoza had enough buoyancy in the midships section alone to support the weight of the ship.

== Service history ==
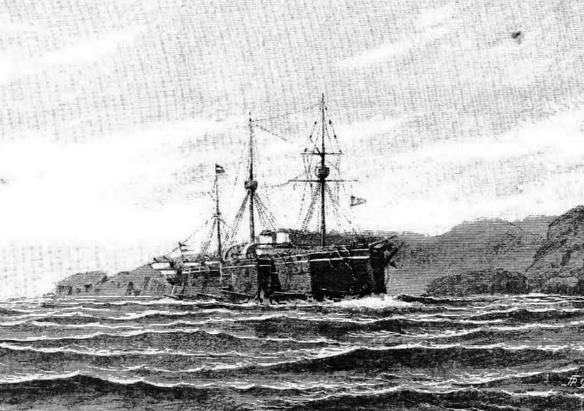
Illustration of Custoza underway in 1899

Custoza was laid down at the STT shipyard in Trieste on 17 November 1869. Her completed hull was launched on 20 August 1872, and she was completed on 18 September 1874. Her first sea trials were conducted over the course of 11–13 February 1875. The ship was named for the Battle of Custoza, an Austrian victory over the Italian army in the Third Italian War of Independence fought in 1866. The government placed a low priority on naval activities, particularly in the 1870s; as a result, the shortage of funds precluded an active fleet policy. The ironclad fleet, including Custoza, was kept out of service in Pola, laid up in reserve; the only vessels to see significant service in the 1870s were several screw frigates sent abroad. The ship's sailing rig was cut down to a schooner rig in 1877.

In 1880, Custoza, the ironclad Prinz Eugen, and the unarmored frigate Laudon took part in an international naval demonstration against the Ottoman Empire to force the Ottomans to transfer the city of Ulcinj to Montenegro in accordance with the terms of the 1878 Congress of Berlin. Custoza remained in commission the following year, along with four smaller vessels. In 1882, the ship received a battery of new quick-firing guns, including four 47 mm (1.9 in) guns, five 47 mm Hotchkiss revolver cannon, and a pair of 25 mm (0.98 in) machine guns. She was also fitted with four 35 cm (14 in) torpedo tubes. At some point before 1887, the ship received anti-torpedo nets.

She participated in the annual fleet maneuvers in 1888, along with the ironclads Don Juan d'Austria, Kaiser Max, Prinz Eugen, and Tegetthoff, and the cruisers Panther, Meteor, and Leopard, under the command of Rear Admiral Manfroni von Manfort. Custoza and the other three ironclads were joined by Prinz Eugen, Panther, and Leopard for a visit to Barcelona, Spain, to take part in the opening ceremonies for the Barcelona Universal Exposition. This was the largest squadron of the Austro-Hungarian Navy that had operated outside the Adriatic. There, the Spanish Queen Maria Christina and Archduke Charles Stephen of Austria inspected both Custoza and Tegetthoff. The following year, the ship took part in a set of major training exercises with five other ironclads, several cruisers, and smaller vessels.

Custoza in the late 1870s

The ship had been reduced to the II Reserve by 1895. From 1902, she was employed as a training ship for naval cadets, a role she filled until 1914. That year, she was converted into a barracks ship, a role she filled until 1920. She was ceded to Italy as a war prize that year under the terms of the Treaty of Saint-Germain-en-Laye. She was immediately broken up in Italy.
