= SMS Kronprinzessin Erzherzogin Stephanie =

Ironclad warship of the Austro-Hungarian Navy

- Kronprinzessin Erzherzogin Stephanie

Class overview
- Preceded by: Kronprinz Erzherzog Rudolf
- Succeeded by: Monarch-class coastal defense ship

History

Austro-Hungarian Empire
- Name: Kronprinzessin Erzherzogin Stephanie
- Namesake: Stephanie, Crown Princess of Austria
- Builder: Stabilimento Tecnico Triestino
- Laid down: 12 November 1884
- Launched: 14 April 1887
- Commissioned: 11 July 1889
- Decommissioned: 1905
- Fate: Ceded to Italy as war prize, 1920 broken up, 1926

General characteristics
- Type: Barbette ship
- Displacement: 5,075 long tons (5,156 t)
- Length: 87.24 m (286 ft 3 in) o/a
- Beam: 17.06 m (56 ft)
- Draft: 6.6 m (21 ft 8 in)
- Installed power: 8,000 ihp (6,000 kW)
- Propulsion: 2 × compound steam engines; 2 × screw propellers
- Speed: 17 knots (31 km/h; 20 mph)
- Crew: 430
- Armament: 2 × 30.5 cm MRK L/35 (12 in) guns; 6 × 15 cm MRK L/35 (6 inch) guns; 9 × 47 mm (1.9 in) QF guns; 2 × 37 mm (1.5 in) QF guns; 4 × 40 cm (15.7 in) torpedo tubes
- Armor: Belt: 229 mm (9 in); Conning tower: 50 mm (2 in); Barbettes: 283 mm (11.1 in)

SMS Kronprinzessin Erzherzogin Stephanie was an ironclad warship built for the Austro-Hungarian Navy in the 1880s, the last vessel of that type to be built for Austria-Hungary. The ship, named for Archduchess Stephanie, Crown Princess of Austria, was laid down in November 1884, was launched in April 1887 and completed in July 1889. She was armed with a pair of 30.5-centimeter (12 in) guns in open barbettes and had a top speed of 17 knots (31 km/h; 20 mph). Her service was limited, in large part due to the rapid pace of naval development in the 1890s, which quickly rendered her obsolescent. As a result, her career was generally limited to routine training and the occasional visit to foreign countries. In 1897, she took part in an international naval demonstration to force a compromise over Greek and Ottoman claims to the island of Crete. Kronprinzessin Erzherzogin Stephanie was decommissioned in 1905, hulked in 1910, and converted into a barracks ship in 1914. After Austria-Hungary's defeat in World War I, the ship was transferred to Italy as a war prize and was eventually broken up for scrap in 1926.

== Design ==
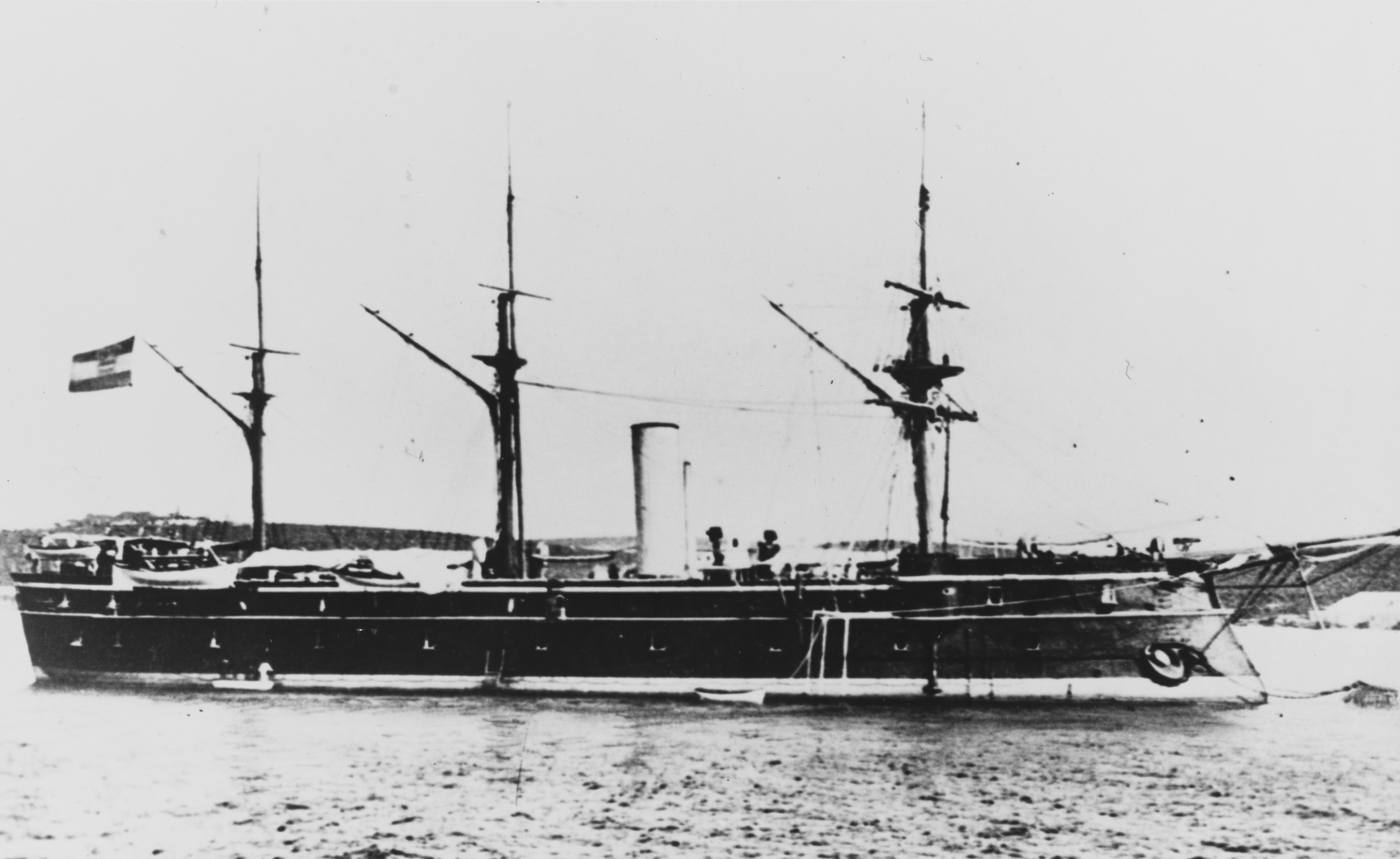
Erzherzog Ferdinand Max, the vessel of which Kronprinzessin Erzherzogin Stephanie was purportedly a reconstruction

In the decades that followed the Austrian victory at the Battle of Lissa in 1866, naval expenditure in the Austro-Hungarian Empire were drastically reduced, in large part due to the veto power the Hungarian half of the empire held. Surrounded by potentially hostile countries powers on land, the Austro-Hungarian Empire was more concerned with these threats, and so naval development was not prioritized. Admiral Friedrich von Pöck argued for several years to improve the strength of the Austro-Hungarian fleet, finally winning authorization to build the center battery ship Tegetthoff in 1875. He spent another six years trying in vain to secure a sister ship to Tegetthoff. In 1881, he called for a fleet of eleven armored warships. Pöck's successor, Maximilian Daublebsky von Sterneck, ultimately had to resort to budgetary sleight of hand, appropriating funds that had been allocated to modernize the ironclad Erzherzog Ferdinand Max to build an entirely new vessel. He attempted to conceal the deception by referring to the ship officially as Ferdinand Max, though the actual Ferdinand Max was still anchored in Pola as a school ship.

According to Conway's All the World's Fighting Ships, the design for the new ship was prepared by Josef Kuchinka, the Director of Naval Construction for the Austro-Hungarian Navy, but the naval historian R. F. Scheltema de Heere credits the naval engineer Moriz Soyka with the work. A second ship, Kronprinz Erzherzog Rudolf, was authorized at the same time. The ships were broadly similar, though Kronprinzessin Erzherzogin Stephanie was significantly smaller and carried one less main battery gun compared to the other vessel. The designs for both ships were heavily influenced by foreign ships like the French ironclads Duguesclin and Amiral Duperré, both of which featured a similar arrangement of the main battery guns that Kuchinka used for his new ships. Chronically starved of funding, the navy was forced to accept significant compromises in the size—and therefore capabilities—of Kronprinz Erzherzog Rudolf and Kronprinzessin Erzherzogin Stephanie, particularly compared to the far larger and more heavily armed Amiral Duperré that inspired their design. Scheltema de Heere severely criticized the decision to build two ships of markedly different size and power at the same time, stating "Either you need three guns or you can do with two, but one unit larger than the other is nonsense."

=== General characteristics and machinery ===
Kronprinzessin Erzherzogin Stephanie was 85.36 meters (280 ft 1 in) long between perpendiculars and 87.24 m (286 ft 3 in) long at the waterline. She had a beam of 17.06 m (56 ft) at the waterline and a maximum breadth of 19.09 m (62 ft 8 in). The ship displaced 4,860 long tons (4,940 t) empty, 5,070.60 long tons (5,151.97 t) normally, and 5,542 long tons (5,631 t) at full load. Her draft ranged from 6.41 m (21 ft) empty, to 6.95 m (22 ft 10 in) normally, and to 7 m (23 ft) fully laden. Her hull was constructed with transverse and longitudinal steel frames and was extensively subdivided into watertight compartments to improve the ship's resistance to flooding. The ship was equipped with a ram bow that was manufactured in Germany by Krupp. Kronprinzessin Erzherzogin Stephanie had a short forecastle deck and a raised sterncastle, and a relatively small superstructure that consisted of a conning tower with a bridge atop it. She was fitted with two pole masts equipped with fighting tops for some of her light guns. Her crew number 430 officers and enlisted men.

The ship was powered by a pair of 3-cylinder compound steam engines driving two 4-bladed screw propellers that were 4.88 m (16 ft) in diameter; the engines were built by Maudslay, Sons and Field of Britain. The number and type of the coal-fired boilers that provided steam for the engines have not survived, though they were trunked into two funnels. Her propulsion system was rated to provide 8,000 indicated horsepower (6,000 kW) for a top speed of 17 knots (31 km/h; 20 mph), though she failed to reach her design speed in service. During her initial trials, which were carried out at a displacement of 5,160 long tons (5,240 t), the ship reached a top speed of 15.93 knots (29.50 km/h; 18.33 mph) from 8,038 ihp (5,994 kW).

=== Armament and armor ===
Line drawing of Kronprinzessin Erzherzogin Stephanie showing the arrangement of the guns and armor

Kronprinzessin Erzherzogin Stephanie was armed with a main battery of two 30.5-centimeter (12 in) MRK 35-caliber guns mounted singly in an open barbette. They were placed forward in sponsons over the battery deck to maximize end-on fire. The guns were manufactured by Krupp, while the carriages that carried them were built by Armstrong Mitchell & Co. The guns fired a 450-kilogram (990 lb) shell using a 140 kg (310 lb) charge of brown powder, which produced a muzzle velocity of 530 meters per second (1,700 ft/s). While the open barbettes provided a wide field of fire for the slow-firing guns, they were rapidly rendered obsolete by the proliferation of rapid-firing light guns, originally intended as defenses against torpedo boats, but were quickly put to use to attack unprotected gun crews. Further, quick-firing (QF) technology was soon to be applied to large-caliber artillery pieces. Each gun had a stock of 68 shells.

The main battery was supported by a secondary battery of six 15 cm (5.9 in) 35-caliber guns, also built by Krupp. These were mounted in gun ports amidships, three on each side, and they were supplied with a total of 408 shells. She carried nine 47 mm (1.9 in) QF guns for close-range defense against torpedo boats; seven were 44-caliber guns and the other two were shorter 33-caliber pieces, all built by Hotchkiss. Her gun armament was rounded out by a pair of 37 mm (1.5 in) 44-caliber QF guns and a pair of 7 cm (2.8 in) 15-caliber landing guns for use by landing parties. As was customary for capital ships of the period, she carried four 40 cm (15.7 in) torpedo tubes; one was mounted in the bow, another in the stern, and one on each broadside.

Kronprinzessin Erzherzogin Stephanie was protected with compound armor manufactured by the Dillinger Hütte works in Germany. The ship was protected by an armored belt that consisted of three strakes of armor plate along the length of the hull. Amidships, where it protected the ship's ammunition magazines and propulsion machinery spaces, the upper strake was 140 mm (5.5 in) thick, while the two lower strakes were 229 mm (9 in) thick. The top strake of the bow section was 102 mm (4 in), while the lower two sections increased slightly to 108 mm (4.3 in). The aft section of belt consisted of a 127 mm (5 in) upper strake and two 152 mm (6 in) strakes below. The entire length of the belt was backed with teak timbers, 204 mm (8 in) thick for the bow and stern sections and 293 mm (11.5 in) amidships. According to Conway's All the World's Fighting Ships, the barbette for the main battery was 283 mm (11.1 in) thick, while Scheltema de Heere cites a thickness of just 152 mm. The conning tower had sides that were 50 mm (2 in) thick. The armor weighed 986.97 long tons (1,002.81 t), about a fifth of the ship's total displacement.

== Service history ==
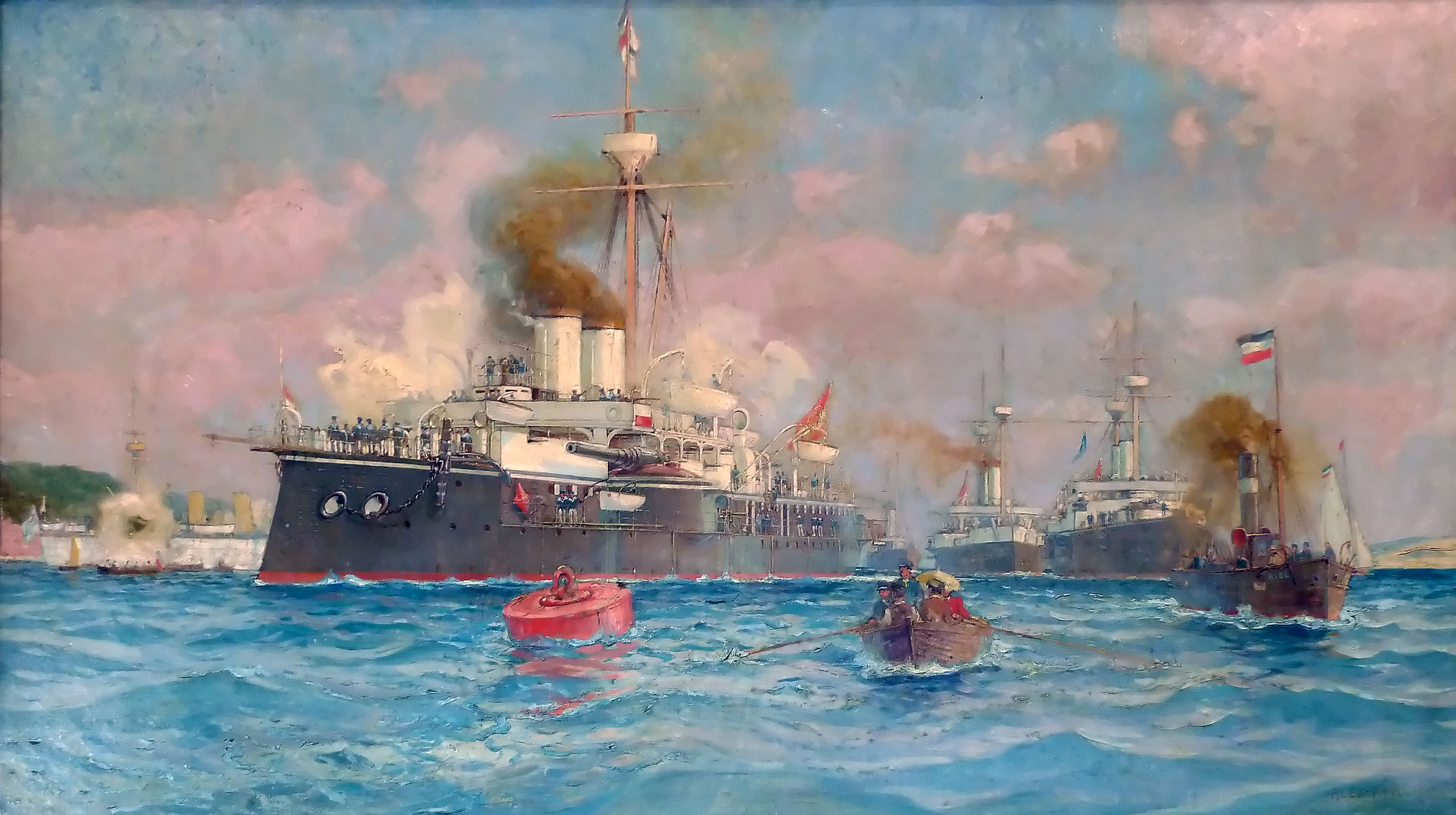
Austro-Hungarian squadron in Kiel, Germany; Kronprinzessin Erzherzogin Stephanie is the rearmost vessel

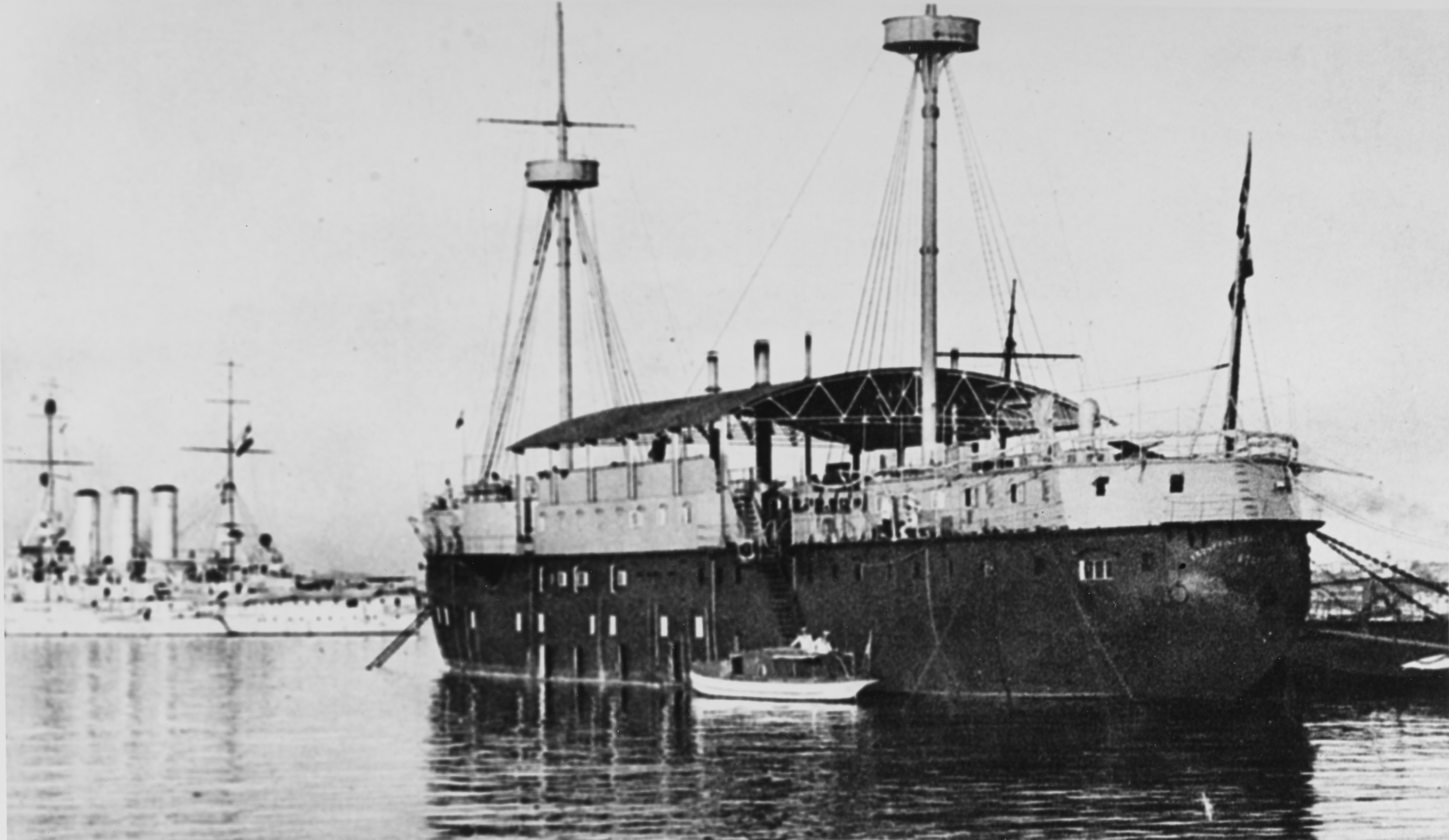
Kronprinzessin Erzherzogin Stephanie hulked in Pola in 1916

Kronprinzessin Erzherzogin Stephanie was built by the Stabilimento Tecnico Triestino shipyard in Trieste. Her keel was laid down on 12 November 1884, the last ironclad to be laid down for the Austro-Hungarian Navy. She was launched on 14 April 1887 and completed in July 1889. She was commissioned for sea trials on 11 July. The following year, the German emperor, Kaiser Wilhelm II, invited the Austro-Hungarian fleet to take part in the annual fleet training exercises in August. Kronprinzessin Erzherzogin Stephanie, the ironclad Kronprinz Erzherzog Rudolf, and the protected cruiser Kaiser Franz Joseph I were sent to Germany under the command of Rear Admiral Johann von Hinke. While en route, the squadron made visits in Gibraltar and Britain; during the latter stop, the ships took part in the Cowes Regatta, where they were reviewed by Queen Victoria. The ships also stopped in Copenhagen, Denmark and Karlskrona, Sweden. During the voyage back to Austria-Hungary, the squadron visited Cherbourg, France and Palermo, Italy.

Celebrations to honor the 400th anniversary of Christopher Columbus's first trans-Atlantic voyage were held in several countries; Kronprinzessin Erzherzogin Stephanie, Kronprinz Erzherzog Rudolf, and Kaiser Franz Joseph I represented Austria-Hungary during the ceremonies in Genoa, Italy, Columbus's birthplace. During the 1893 fleet maneuvers, Kronprinzessin Erzherzogin Stephanie was mobilized to train alongside the ironclads Kronprinz Erzherzog Rudolf, Prinz Eugen, Kaiser Max, and Don Juan d'Austria, among other vessels.

In February 1897, Kronprinzessin Erzherzogin Stephanie deployed to Crete to serve in the International Squadron, a multinational force made up of ships of the Austro-Hungarian Navy, French Navy, Imperial German Navy, Italian Royal Navy (Regia Marina), Imperial Russian Navy, and British Royal Navy that intervened in the 1897–1898 Greek uprising on Crete against rule by the Ottoman Empire. She arrived as part of an Austro-Hungarian contingent that also included the armored cruiser Kaiserin und Königin Maria Theresia, the torpedo cruisers Tiger, Leopard, and Sebenico, three destroyers, and eight torpedo boats, the third-largest contingent in the International Squadron after those of the United Kingdom and the Kingdom of Italy. The International Squadron operated off Crete until December 1898, but Austria-Hungary, displeased with the decision to create an autonomous Cretan State under the suzerainty of the Ottoman Empire, withdrew its ships in March 1898.

By 1898, the Austro-Hungarian Navy regarded Kronprinzessin Erzherzogin Stephanie as a second-rate vessel after less than 10 years in service. The rapid pace of naval development in the late 19th century had quickly rendered her obsolescent. She was decommissioned in 1905, and in 1908, the Austro-Hungarian Navy attempted to sell the ship, Kronprinz Erzherzog Rudolf, and Tegetthoff to Uruguay in an attempt to raise funds for new projects, but the deal fell through. In 1910, she was hulked and became a barracks ship for the mine warfare school in 1914, and served in this role for the duration of World War I. Following the conclusion of the conflict in 1918, Kronprinzessin Erzherzogin Stephanie was ceded to Italy as a war prize in 1920 and eventually broken up for scrap in 1926.
