= Kaiser Max-class ironclad (1875) =

Ironclad warship class of the Austro-Hungarian Navy

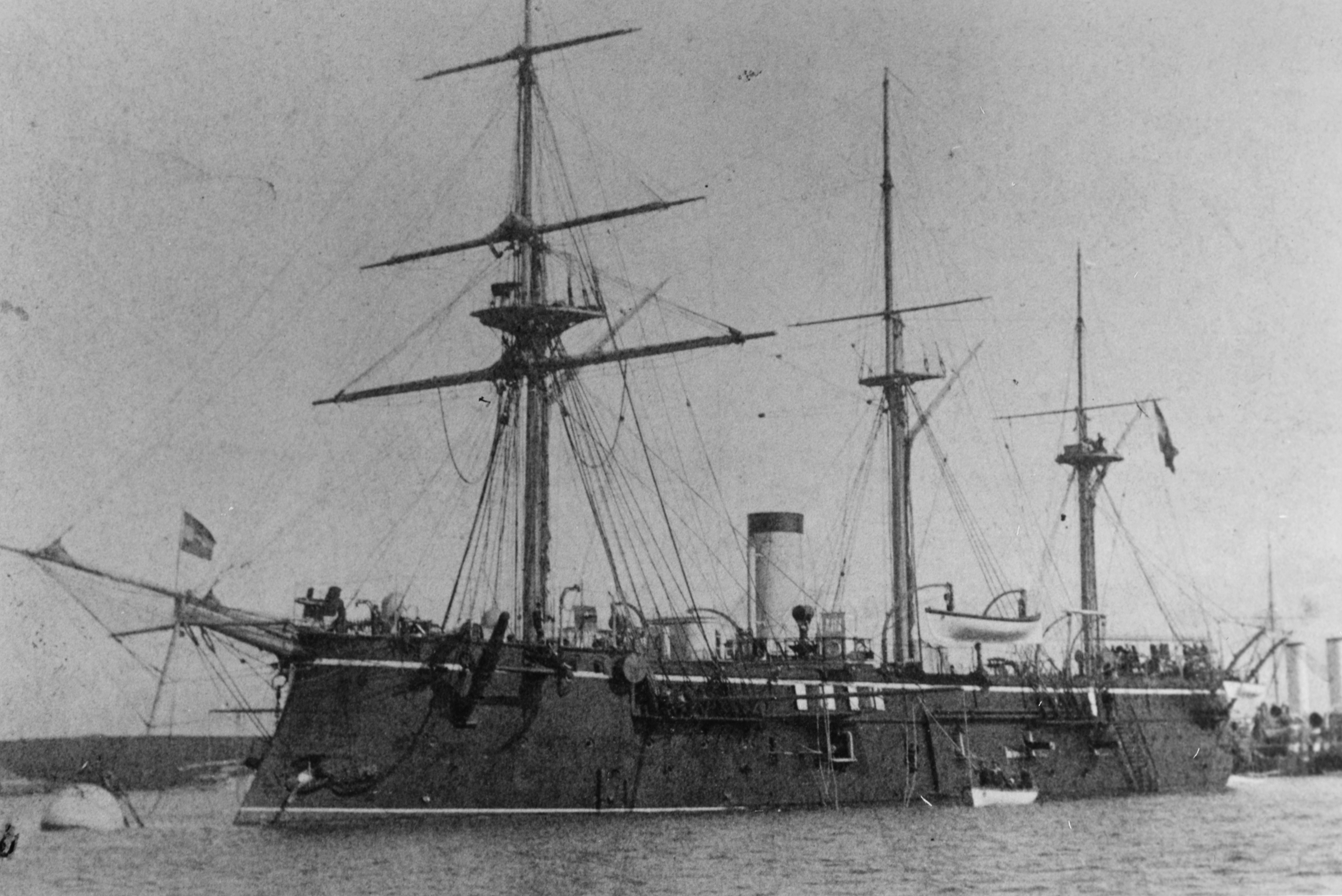
- Kaiser Max c. 1880–1889

Class overview
- Operators: Austro-Hungarian Navy
- Preceded by: SMS Kaiser
- Succeeded by: SMS Tegetthoff
- Built: 1874–1878
- In commission: 1876–1912
- Completed: 3
- Lost: 1
- Scrapped: 2

General characteristics
- Type: Casemate ship
- Displacement: 3,548 long tons (3,605 t)
- Length: 75.87 m (248 ft 11 in) o/a; 73.23 m (240 ft 3 in) lwl
- Beam: 15.25 m (50 ft)
- Draft: 6.15 m (20 ft 2 in)
- Installed power: 2,755 ihp (2,054 kW)
- Propulsion: 1 × marine steam engine; 1 × screw propeller
- Speed: 13.28 knots (24.59 km/h; 15.28 mph)
- Crew: 400
- Armament: 8 × 21 cm (8.3 in) guns; 4 × 9 cm (3.5 in) guns; 2 × 7 cm (2.8 in) guns; 6 × 47 mm (1.9 in) QF guns; 3 × 47 mm (1.9 in) Hotchkiss revolver cannon; 2 × 25 mm (0.98 in) guns; 4 × 35 cm (13.8 in) torpedo tubes
- Armor: Belt: 203 mm (8 in); Casemate: 125 mm (4.9 in)

The Kaiser Max class of ironclad warships was a group of three casemate ships built for the Austro-Hungarian Navy in the 1870s: Kaiser Max, Don Juan d'Austria, and Prinz Eugen. The three ships were ostensibly the same vessels as the earlier Kaiser Max class, though they were in fact entire new vessels. Only parts of the earlier ships' machinery, armor plating, and other equipment were reused in the new ironclads. The ships were all laid down in 1874; the first two were launched in 1875 and completed in 1876, while work on Prinz Eugen proceeded much more slowly. She was launched in 1877 and completed in 1878. The three ships were armed with a battery of eight 21-centimeter (8.3 in) guns mounted in a central, armored casemate, and were capable of a top speed of 13.28 knots (24.59 km/h; 15.28 mph).

The ships had fairly uneventful careers, owing in part to the restricted naval budgets of the 1870s and 1880s, which precluded an active fleet policy. The three ships made one major overseas cruise to Spain in 1888 to take part in the Barcelona Universal Exposition. They were withdrawn from service in the early 1900s and converted for secondary roles; Kaiser Max and Don Juan d'Austria became barracks ships and Prinz Eugen became a repair ship and was renamed Vulkan. After World War I, Don Juan d'Austria sank under unclear circumstances while the other two ships were seized by Italy. Kaiser Max was transferred to the Royal Yugoslav Navy in the postwar peace negotiations and renamed Tivat. Italy refused to turn Vulkan over to Yugoslavia, however. The ultimate fate of both vessels is unclear.

== Design ==
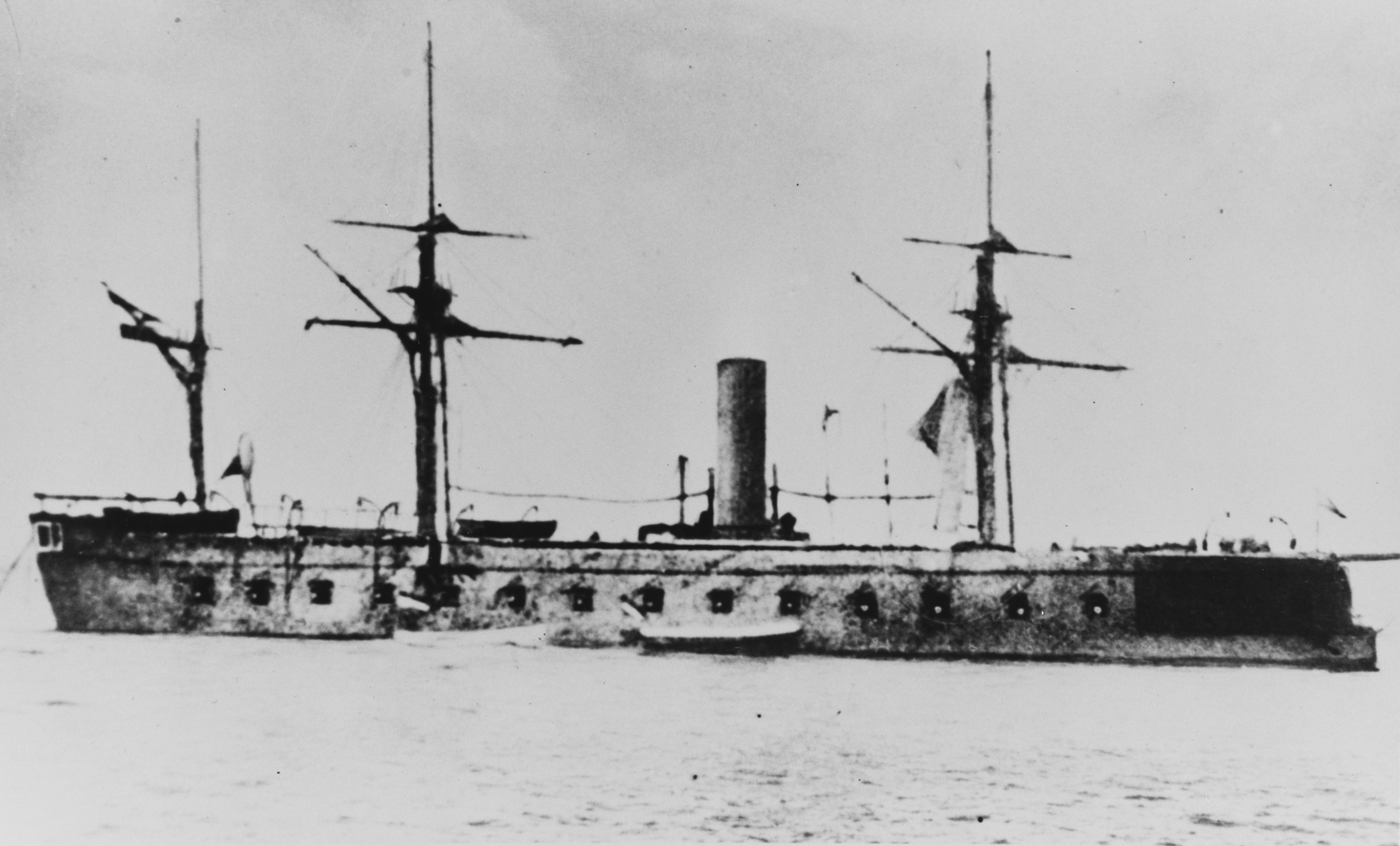
Prinz Eugen of the earlier Kaiser Max class

In the early 1870s, the head of the Austro-Hungarian Navy, Friedrich von Pöck, repeatedly tried to secure funding from parliament for new ironclad warships, but the government, preoccupied with rebuilding the Austro-Hungarian Army after its crushing defeat at the Battle of Königgrätz in 1866, refused to divert funds to the navy's budget for new ships. In addition, obstruction from the Hungarian half of the empire, which was less concerned with naval matters, added an additional obstacle for the navy in its attempts to improve its fighting strength.

Reconstruction projects were uncontroversial, however, and so Pöck requested funds to rebuild the old Kaiser Max-class ironclads, intending instead to use the money to build new ships. The new vessels would be built to similar dimensions as the earlier vessels, and some material, including the engines, armor plate, and various fittings, would be reused to save money. To complete the deception, he assigned the ships the same names, which has led to some confusion in subsequent histories, including accepting Pöck's lie that they were the same vessels, despite noting the different dimensions of the hulls. Part of the confusion owes to the records in the Austrian state and military archives, which refer to the ships as simple conversions, not new constructions.

The design for the new ships was prepared by Chief Engineer Josef von Romako, who had also designed the earlier Kaiser Maxes. The "reconstructions" proved to be very economical, with the three new ships costing as much as had been spent on the ironclad Erzherzog Albrecht. The project was not without critics, however; the naval historian R. F. Scheltema de Heere describes the vessels as "hopelessly obsolete".

=== General characteristics and machinery ===
The ships of the Kaiser Max class were 75.87 meters (248 ft 11 in) long overall and 73.23 m (240 ft 3 in) long at the waterline. They had a beam of 15.25 m (50 ft) and an average draft of 6.15 m (20 ft 2 in). The ships displaced 3,548 long tons (3,605 t). Each vessel had a crew that ranged from 400 to 440 officers and enlisted men. As was common for ironclads of the period, they had a pronounced ram bow. The ships had a short forecastle deck that terminated at the foremast and a short sterncastle deck that began just aft of the mizzenmast. As completed, the ships had no significant superstructure, but during a modernization later in their careers, a small conning tower was erected. The ships were originally fitted with a three-masted barquentine rig with an area of 1,633.15 square meters (17,579.1 sq ft), but in 1880 the rigging was cut down to 1,156.6 m^{2} (12,450 sq ft). By the 1890s, the ships had their rigging removed altogether and instead carried three masts with fighting tops for light guns.

Their propulsion system consisted of one horizontal, single-expansion, 2-cylinder steam engine that had been salvaged from the earlier Kaiser Maxes. The engine drove a single screw propeller that was 5.64 m (18.5 ft) in diameter. Steam was provided by five coal-fired boilers with thirty fireboxes, which were trunked into a single funnel. The engines were rated to produce a top speed of 12 knots (22 km/h; 14 mph) from 2,755 indicated horsepower (2,054 kW), but Kaiser Max reached a maximum of 13.38 knots (24.78 km/h; 15.40 mph) during her initial trials. Each ship had a storage capacity of 380 long tons (390 t) of coal.

=== Armament and armor ===
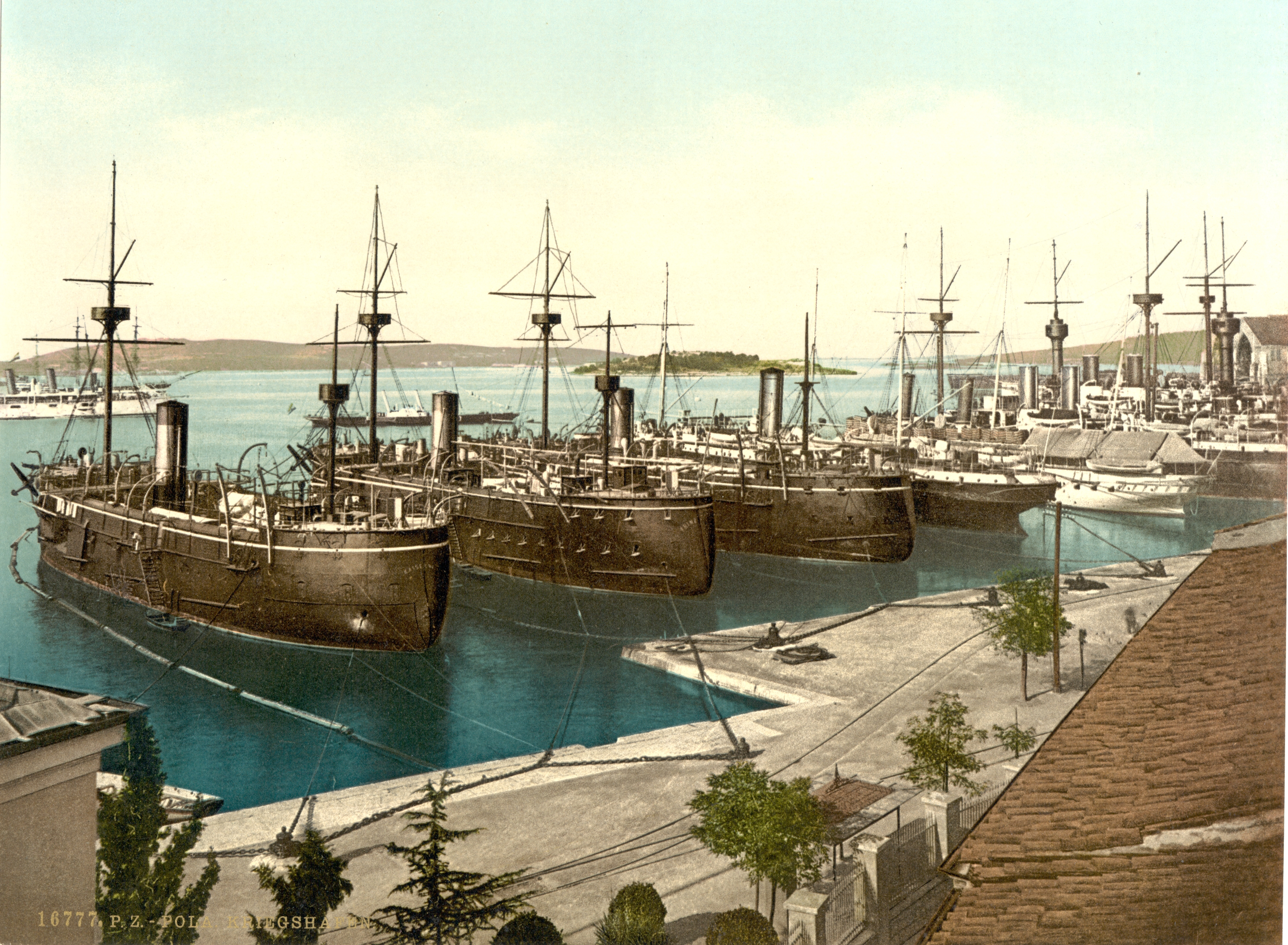
Kaiser Max (left), Prinz Eugen (center), and Don Juan d'Austria (right) in Pola

The Kaiser Max-class ships were casemate ships, which concentrated the main battery in a centrally located armored casemate, which allowed for limited end-on fire, though only forward, unlike earlier ironclads. Their battery of eight 21-centimeter (8.3 in) 20-caliber (cal.) guns manufactured by Krupp were mounted four on each broadside, with the forwardmost guns on each side in an angled gun port. The other three were capable of firing only limited arc to the side. They also carried four 9 cm (3.5 in) 24-cal. guns, two 7 cm (2.8 in) 15-cal. landing guns, six 47 mm (1.9 in) 35-cal. quick-firing guns, three 47 mm (1.9 in) Hotchkiss revolver cannon, and two 25 mm (0.98 in) guns. Each ship of the Kaiser Max class also had four 35 cm (13.8 in) torpedo tubes, one in the bow, one in the stern, and one on each broadside.

The ships' armor protection consisted of an armored belt that was 203 mm (8 in) thick and was capped with 115 mm (4.5 in) thick transverse bulkheads on either end of the citadel. Only the two strakes of the belt armor were newly manufactured; the rest of the iron used to protect the casemate deck came from the earlier Kaiser Max class. The casemate battery was protected with 125 mm (4.9 in) thick plates. The new belt armor consisted of Bessemer steel.

== Ships ==
Name	Builder	Laid down	Launched	Completed
Kaiser Max	Stabilimento Tecnico Triestino, Trieste	14 February 1874	28 December 1875	26 October 1876
Don Juan d'Austria	Stabilimento Tecnico Triestino, Trieste	14 February 1874	25 October 1875	26 June 1876
Prinz Eugen	Pola Naval Arsenal, Pola	October 1874	7 September 1877	November 1878

== Service history ==
Don Juan d'Austria as modernized, c. 1898

The three ships spent the 1870s laid up in Pola; budgetary issues prevented the ironclad fleet from being active. In 1881, Prinz Eugen was mobilized for the first time to take part in an international naval demonstration against the Ottoman Empire to force it to transfer the city of Ulcinj to Montenegro in accordance with the terms of the 1878 Congress of Berlin. In 1888, all three ships traveled to Barcelona, Spain, with several other major warships to take part in the opening ceremonies for the Barcelona Universal Exposition. This was the largest squadron of the Austro-Hungarian Navy that had operated outside the Adriatic up to that point. The three ships participated in fleet training exercises in June and July 1889.

The three Kaiser Maxes were stricken from the naval register after the turn of the century to free up funds for new construction projects. Kaiser Max and Don Juan d'Austria were deleted from the list in December and June 1904, respectively, though Prinz Eugen lingered on until December 1912. The first two ships became floating barracks and Prinz Eugen was converted into a repair ship and renamed Vulkan. All three members of the class remained in the navy's inventory through World War I; Italy seized Kaiser Max and Vulkan, though both were awarded to the Royal Yugoslav Navy in the postwar peace negotiations. Italy refused to relinquish Vulkan, the fate of which is unknown, but Kaiser Max was transferred to Yugoslavia and renamed Tivat. The ship was either scrapped in 1924, or kept in the Yugoslav inventory until the country was overrun in the Axis invasion during World War II, her fate after falling back into Italian hands unknown. Don Juan d'Austria, meanwhile, sank under uncertain circumstances in 1919 before she could be seized by the victorious Allied powers.
