= SMS Don Juan d'Austria (1875) =

Austro-Hungarian Navy ironclad warship

- Don Juan d'Austria in her original configuration

History

Austro-Hungarian Empire
- Name: Don Juan d'Austria
- Namesake: John of Austria
- Builder: Stabilimento Tecnico Triestino
- Laid down: 14 February 1874
- Launched: 25 October 1875
- Commissioned: 26 June 1876
- Stricken: 29 June 1904
- Fate: Sank, 1919

General characteristics
- Class & type: Kaiser Max class
- Displacement: 3,548 long tons (3,605 t)
- Length: 75.87 m (248 ft 11 in) o/a; 73.23 m (240 ft 3 in) lwl
- Beam: 15.25 m (50 ft)
- Draft: 6.15 m (20 ft 2 in)
- Installed power: 2,755 ihp (2,054 kW)
- Propulsion: 1 × marine steam engine; 1 × screw propeller
- Speed: 13.28 knots (24.59 km/h; 15.28 mph)
- Crew: 400
- Armament: 8 × 21 cm (8.3 in) guns; 4 × 9 cm (3.5 in) guns; 2 × 7 cm (2.8 in) guns; 6 × 47 mm (1.9 in) QF guns; 3 × 47 mm (1.9 in) Hotchkiss revolver cannon; 2 × 25 mm (0.98 in) guns; 4 × 35 cm (13.8 in) torpedo tubes
- Armor: Belt: 203 mm (8 in); Casemate: 125 mm (4.9 in)

SMS Don Juan d'Austria was an ironclad warship built for the Austro-Hungarian Navy in the 1870s, the second of the three ships of the Kaiser Max class. The ship was purportedly the same vessel that had been laid down in 1861, and had simply been reconstructed. This was a fiction, however; the head of the Austro-Hungarian Navy could not secure funding for new ships, but reconstruction projects were uncontroversial, so he "rebuilt" the three earlier Kaiser Max-class ironclads. Only the engines and parts of the armor plate were reused in the new Don Juan d'Austria, which was laid down in February 1874, launched in December 1875, and commissioned in October 1876. The ship's career was fairly limited, in part due to slender naval budgets that prevented much active use. She made foreign visits and took part in limited training exercises in the 1880s and 1890s. Long since obsolete, Don Juan d'Austria was removed from service in 1904 and used as a barracks ship through World War I. After the war, she sank under unclear circumstances.

== Design ==
Don Juan d'Austria as modernized, c. 1898

Faced with perennial refusal from the Austro-Hungarian parliaments to provide funding for new ironclad warships, the chief of the Austro-Hungarian Navy, Friedrich von Pöck, resorted to subterfuge to acquire the needed vessels. He proposed "rebuilding" the existing three Kaiser Max-class ironclads, since such maintenance costs were easier to secure approval. In reality, the three old broadside ironclads were dismantled and three, larger central-battery ships were constructed. To complete the deception, the ships' names were carried over, and some materials from the old ships were incorporated into the new vessels.

Don Juan d'Austria was 75.87 meters (248 ft 11 in) long overall and 73.23 m (240 ft 3 in) long at the waterline; she had a beam of 15.25 m (50 ft) and an average draft of 6.15 m (20 ft 2 in). She displaced 3,548 long tons (3,605 t). As was common for ironclads of the period, she had a pronounced ram bow. She had a crew of 400 officers and men.

Her propulsion system consisted of one single-expansion marine steam engine that drove a single screw propeller. The number and type of her coal-fired boilers have not survived, but they were vented through a single funnel placed slightly forward of amidships. Her engine produced a top speed of 13.28 knots (24.59 km/h; 15.28 mph) from 2,755 indicated horsepower (2,054 kW). The ship was fitted with a three-masted sailing rig to supplement the steam engines.

Don Juan d'Austria was a casemate ship, and she was armed with a main battery of eight 21-centimeter (8.3 in) 20-caliber (cal.) guns manufactured by Krupp, mounted in a central casemate, four on each broadside. She also carried four 9 cm (3.5 in) 24-cal. guns, two 7 cm (2.8 in) 15-cal. landing guns, six 47 mm (1.9 in) 35-cal. quick-firing guns, three 47 mm (1.9 in) Hotchkiss revolver cannon, and two 25 mm (0.98 in) guns. Don Juan d'Austria also had four 35 cm (13.8 in) torpedo tubes, one in the bow, one in the stern, and one on each broadside.

The ship's armor consisted of an armored belt that was 203 mm (8 in) thick and was capped with 115 mm (4.5 in) thick transverse bulkheads on either end of the citadel. The casemate battery was protected with 125 mm (4.9 in) thick plates.

== Service history ==
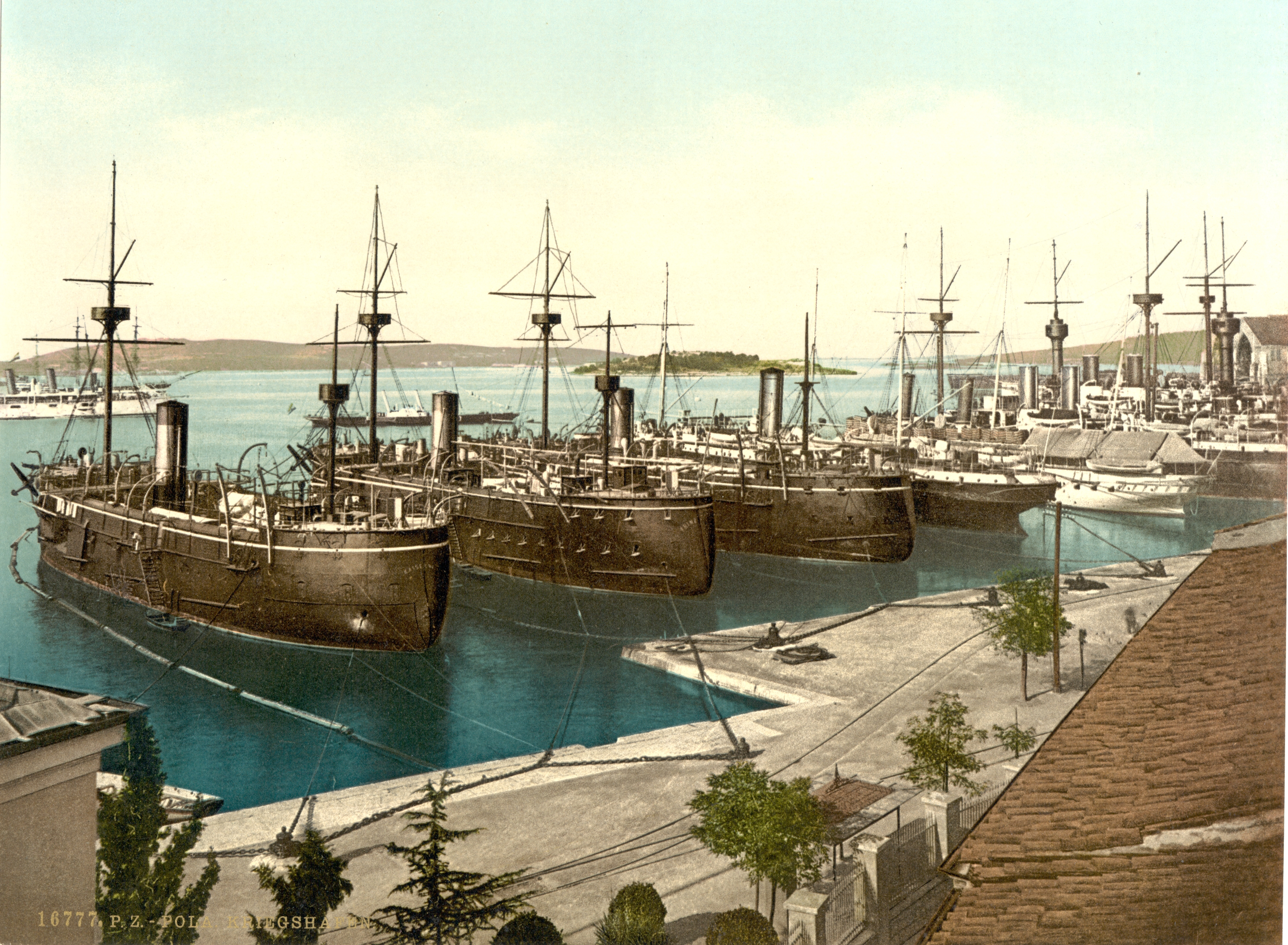
Kaiser Max (left), Prinz Eugen (center), and Don Juan d'Austria (right) in Pola

The keel for Don Juan d'Austria was laid down at the Stabilimento Tecnico Triestino shipyard on 14 February 1874. The ship was ostensibly the same vessel that had been laid down in 1861, as the Austro-Hungarian parliament had approved a so-called reconstruction program of that Don Juan d'Austria. The head of the Austro-Hungarian Navy, Vice Admiral Friedrich von Pöck, had resorted to subterfuge to circumvent parliamentary hostility to new ironclad construction; he requested funds to modernize the earlier vessel, but in fact, he had that vessel broken up, with only the machinery, parts of the armor plate, and other miscellaneous equipment being incorporated into the new ship. She was launched on 25 October 1875 and completed by 26 June 1876, when she was commissioned into the Austro-Hungarian fleet. The ship began her sea trials on 29 August 1876.

The government placed a low priority on naval activities, particularly in the 1870s; as a result, the shortage of funds precluded an active fleet policy. The ironclad fleet, including Custoza, was kept out of service in Pola, laid up in reserve; the only vessels to see significant service in the 1870s were several screw frigates sent abroad. In 1880, Don Juan d'Austria had her sailing rig reduced. Don Juan d'Austria and an Austro-Hungarian squadron that included the ironclads Custoza, Tegetthoff, Kaiser Max, and Prinz Eugen and the torpedo cruisers Panther and Leopard traveled to Barcelona, Spain, to take part in the opening ceremonies for the Barcelona Universal Exposition of 1888. This was the largest squadron of the Austro-Hungarian Navy that had operated outside the Adriatic. The same year, she participated in the annual fleet maneuvers in 1888, along with the ironclads Kaiser Max, Custoza, Prinz Eugen, and Tegetthoff, and the cruisers Panther, Leopard, and Meteor, under the command of Rear Admiral Manfroni von Manfort.

In June and July 1889, Don Juan d'Austria participated in fleet training exercises, which also included the ironclads Custoza, Erzherzog Albrecht, Tegetthoff, Prinz Eugen, and Kaiser Max. During the 1893 fleet maneuvers, Don Juan d'Austria was mobilized to train alongside the ironclads Kronprinz Erzherzog Rudolf, Kronprinzessin Erzherzogin Stephanie, Prinz Eugen, and Kaiser Max, among other vessels. A new construction program in the late 1890s and early 1900s required the Austro-Hungarian Navy to discard old, obsolete vessels to reduce annual budgets. These ships were largely reused in secondary roles. Don Juan d'Austria was stricken from the naval register on 29 June 1904 and converted into a barracks ship the following year. She was based in Pola and used by torpedo boat crews through World War I. The ship sank after the war in 1919 under unclear circumstances.
