= SMS Tegetthoff (1878) =

Ironclad warship of the Austro-Hungarian Navy

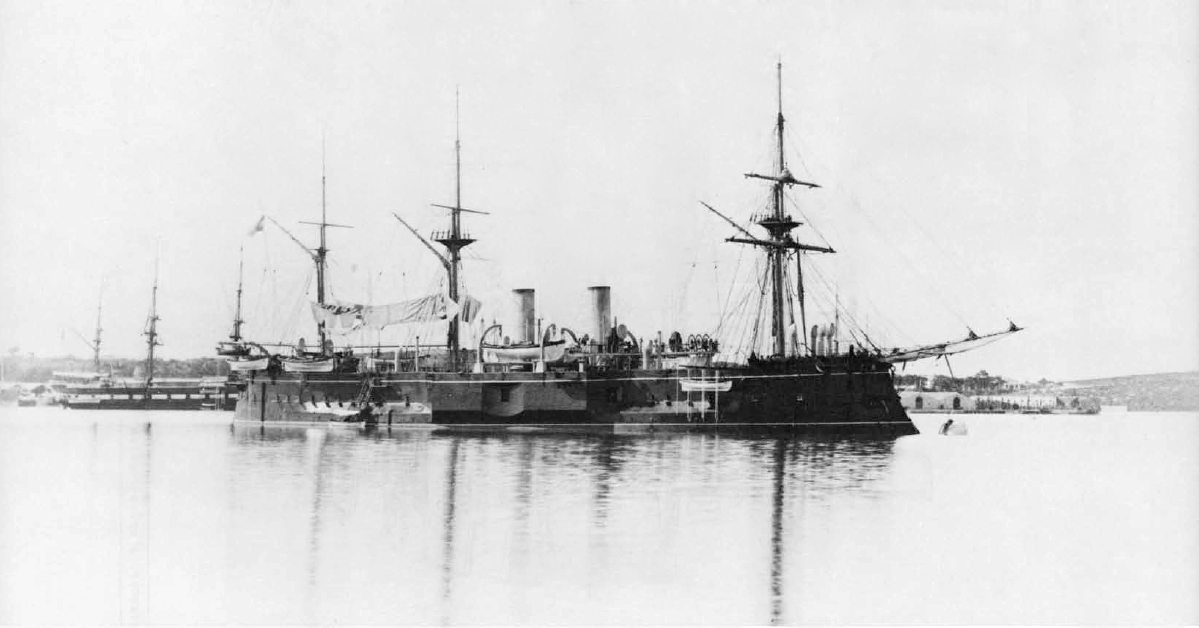
- Tegetthoff in her original configuration

Class overview
- Preceded by: Kaiser Max class
- Succeeded by: Kronprinz Erzherzog Rudolf

History

Austro-Hungarian Empire
- Name: SMS Tegetthoff
- Namesake: Wilhelm von Tegetthoff
- Builder: Stabilimento Tecnico Triestino, Trieste
- Laid down: 1 April 1876
- Launched: 15 October 1878
- Completed: 1881
- Commissioned: September 1882
- Renamed: Mars, 1912
- Reclassified: Harbor guard ship, 1906
- Stricken: 1906
- Fate: Broken up in Italy, 1920

General characteristics
- Type: Central-battery ironclad
- Displacement: 7,390 long tons (7,510 t)
- Length: 92.4 m (303 ft 2 in)
- Beam: 19.1 m (62 ft 8 in)
- Draft: 7.6 m (24 ft 11 in)
- Installed power: 6,706 ihp (5,001 kW); 8 × Scotch marine boilers
- Propulsion: 1 × compound steam engine; 1 × screw propeller
- Speed: 13 knots (24 km/h; 15 mph)
- Range: 3,300 nmi (6,100 km; 3,800 mi) at 10 knots (19 km/h; 12 mph)
- Complement: 525
- Armament: 6 × 280 mm (11 in) Krupp breech-loading guns; 6 × 89 mm (3.5 in) guns; 2 × 70 mm (2.8 in) guns; 9 × 47 mm (1.9 in) guns
- Armor: Waterline belt: 230–356 mm (9–14 in); Battery: 127–305 mm (5–12 in); Bulkheads: 254–300 mm (10.0–11.8 in); Decks: 76 mm (3 in); Conning tower: 178 mm (7 in)

SMS Tegetthoff was an ironclad warship of the Austro-Hungarian Navy. She was built by the Stabilimento Tecnico Triestino shipyard in Trieste, between April 1876 and October 1881. She was armed with a main battery of six 28 cm (11 in) guns mounted in a central-battery. The ship had a limited career, and did not see action. In 1897, she was reduced to a guard ship in Pola, and in 1912 she was renamed Mars. She served as a training ship after 1917, and after the end of World War I, she was surrendered as a war prize to Italy, which sold her for scrapping in 1920.

== Design ==
Tegetthoff was a central battery ship designed by Chief Engineer Josef von Romako. The ship's namesake, Admiral Wilhelm von Tegetthoff, victor of the Battle of Lissa, had proposed building four new ironclads. These were to be completed by 1878, but poor economic conditions in the early 1870s forced the Austro-Hungarian government to cut back the naval budget. Admiral Friedrich von Pöck, who succeeded Tegetthoff as the head of naval administration, had attempted to secure funding for two new ships, to be named Tegetthoff and Erzherzog Karl from 1871. Pöck finally succeeded in convincing parliament to allocate funds for the first ship in 1875. He continued to try to convince the parliament to build a sister ship for Tegetthoff until 1880, without success. Austro-Hungarian industry was incapable of supporting the construction of the ship, and significant components had to be ordered from foreign manufacturers, including guns from Germany and armor plating from Britain.

Romako made numerous improvements over earlier central battery ships like Erzherzog Karl and Custoza, including refining the hull shape to reduce the need for curved armor plate. The arrangement of the main battery was altered considerably; whereas the earlier ships had carried guns on two decks, Tegetthoff carried hers on a single deck, and the gun ports were arranged in such a way that the guns could be trained side to side without having to move them to another port. The naval historian R. F. Scheltema de Heere considers Tegetthoff to be "the only sensible casemate ship ever built", which "must be considered a stroke of genius."

=== General characteristics ===
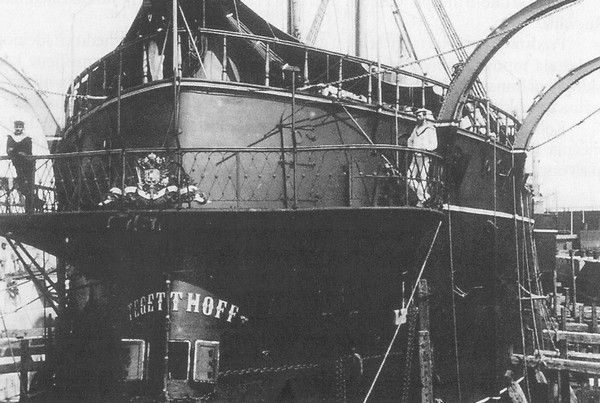
Tegetthoff in drydock

Tegetthoff was 89.39 meters (293.3 ft) long at the waterline and 92.46 m (303.3 ft) long overall, and she had a beam of 21.78 m (71.5 ft). The ship displaced 6,492 long tons (6,596 t) empty, 7,431 long tons (7,550 t) normally, and up to 7,820 long tons (7,950 t) at full load. During stability tests, it was determined that the ship's maximum displacement was 7,939.47 long tons (8,066.87 t). When empty, the ship had a draft of 7.16 m (23.5 ft), at normal loading it increased to 7.573 m (24.85 ft), and at full load, the ship had a draft of 7.88 m (25.9 ft).

As was standard for capital ships of the period, Tegetthoff was fitted with a pronounced ram bow. She had short forecastle and sterncastle decks. Tegetthoff was the first ship in the Austrian Navy to be built with an all-steel hull, which allowed for a considerable savings in weight. Steering was controlled with a single rudder, from an unprotected position atop the conning tower or from a battle conning position below decks, behind the ship's heavy side armor. Tegetthoff had a transverse metacentric height of 1.615 m (5 ft 3.6 in). The ship's crew numbered 525 officers and men.

As built, the ship was powered by a single 2-cylinder, vertical compound steam engine that drove a single two-bladed screw propeller that was 7.16 m (23.5 ft) in diameter. Steam was provided by nine fire-tube boilers with three fireboxes apiece that were vented through a pair of funnels on the centerline amidships. She was initially fitted with a three-masted sailing rig, though this was removed during the modernization, and two heavy fighting masts were installed in its place.

The propulsion system was rated to produce 1,200 nominal horsepower, but during her initial trials at around normal displacement in 1881, the engines reached 5,231 indicated horsepower (3,901 kW), which gave Tegetthoff a top speed of 14 knots (26 km/h; 16 mph). Two years later, another round of trials were carried out with the ship overloaded to 7,918 long tons (8,045 t), and she nevertheless managed 6,706 ihp (5,001 kW) for 13.97 knots (25.87 km/h; 16.08 mph).

=== Armament and armor ===
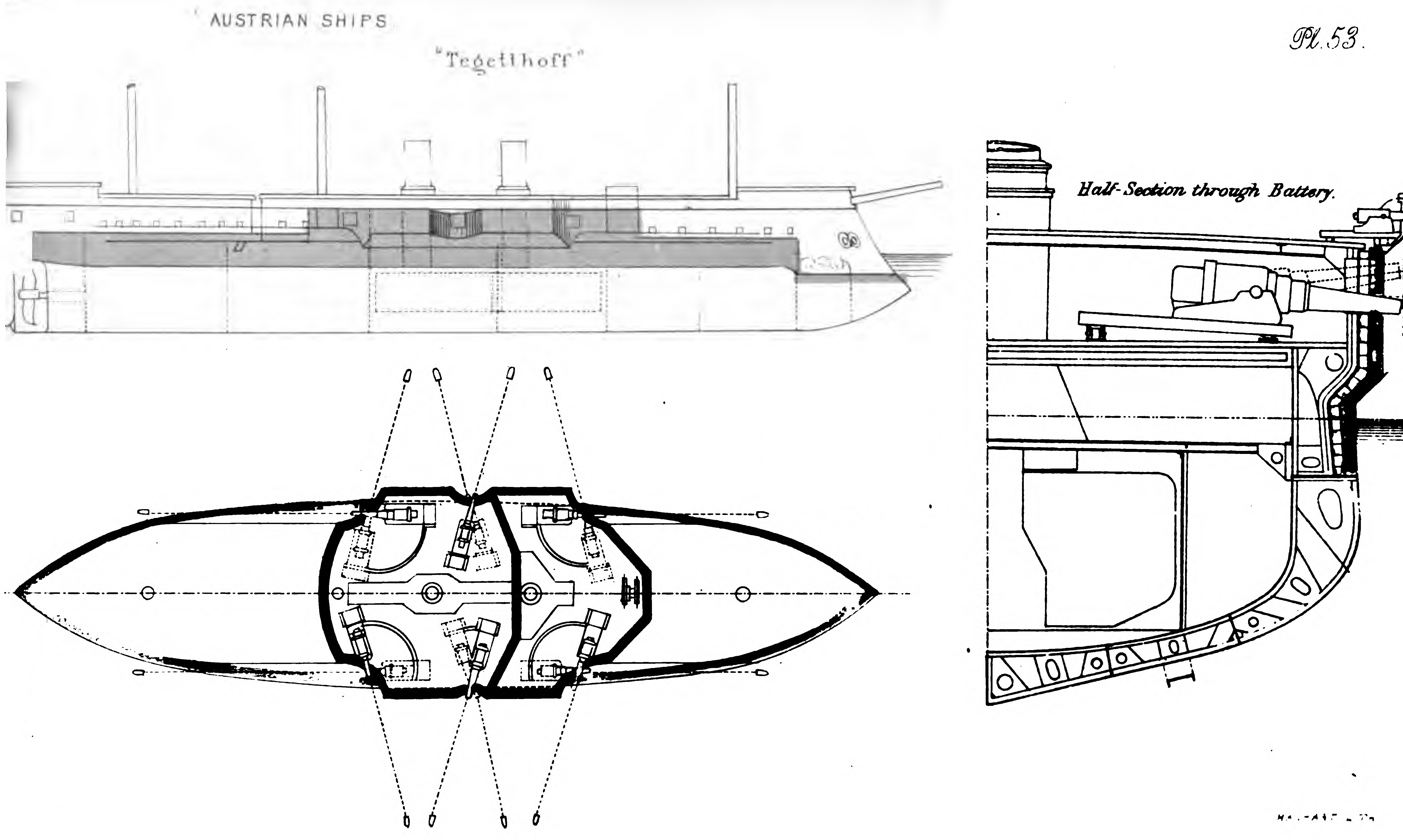
Plan, profile, and cross-section of Tegetthoff, as depicted in Brassey's Naval Annual in 1887

Tegetthoff was initially equipped with a main battery of six 28-centimeter (11 in) L/18 breech-loading guns manufactured by Krupp. (Note: "L/18" refers to the length (Länge) of the gun in terms of calibers; in this case, the gun was 18 calibers long.) These guns were mounted in a central battery amidships, and were intended to be used during pursuit and ramming attempts. Each gun had a range of elevation from -5° to +8.25°, and the forward guns could fire directly ahead. The aft guns could be fired directly astern, while the center pair had more limited firing arcs. The ammunition magazine was located directly below the main battery. The ship also carried six 9 cm (3.5 in) L/24 breech-loaders, two 7 cm (2.8 in) L/15 breech-loaders, and four 47 mm (1.9 in) quick-firing (QF) guns. All of these guns were carried in individual pivot mounts on the upper deck, and in the case of the 47 mm guns, in fighting tops on the masts.

The main armored belt consisted of 356 mm (14 in) thick armor plate in the central section, and the end bulkheads of the armored citadel were 254 to 305 mm (10 to 12 in) thick. On either end of the citadel, the belt tapered slightly to 330 mm (13 in). The armor plate for the main battery casemate ranged in thickness from 127 to 330 mm (5 to 13 in). The conning tower had sides that were 127 to 178 mm (5 to 7 in) thick. Tegetthoff's armor plate amounted to 2,122.5 long tons (2,156.6 t), more than a quarter of the ship's total displacement.

=== Modifications ===
In the mid-1890s, Tegetthoff was extensively modernized. Her boilers were replaced with eight new Scotch marine boilers. After her reconstruction in the early 1890s, her propulsion system was replaced with a pair of 3-cylinder triple expansion engines built by the German firm Schichau-Werke. These were rated at 8,160 ihp (6,080 kW), for a top speed of 15.32 kn (28.37 km/h; 17.63 mph) on trials. Her crew was increased to between 568 and 575. Also during the modernization, the main battery was replaced with 24 cm (9.4 in) L/35 C/86 guns from Krupp. (Note: "C/86" refers to the year the gun was designed (Construktionsjahr).) The secondary guns now consisted of five 15 cm (5.9 in) L/35 QF guns, two 66 mm (2.6 in) L/18 guns, nine 47 mm L/44 QF guns, six 47 mm L/33 machine guns, and a pair of 8 mm (0.31 in) machine guns. Tegetthoff was also equipped with two 35 cm (13.8 in) torpedo tubes, one in the bow and one in the stern.

== Service history ==
Tegetthoff in Pola in the late 1880s

Tegetthoff was laid down on 1 April 1876 at the Stabilimento Tecnico Triestino shipyard in Trieste. The ship was launched on 15 October 1878, and completed in 1881. Supervision of the ship's construction was entrusted to the engineer Carl Tullinger, who had previously been sent to Amsterdam to observe the ship model basin that had been built there, the second example to be built in the world. According to Lawrence Sondhaus, Tegetthoff began her sea trials in October 1881, but Scheltema de Heere, citing records from the Austrian archives, provides a date of 5 August 1882 as the beginning of her trials. The ship was ready for commissioning in September 1882; Kaiser Franz Joseph attended the commissioning of the ship in Pola. Financial difficulties had again delayed the ship's completion; the parliament finally voted to allocate funds to finish the ship in November 1881. At the time, she was the largest and most powerful ship in the Austro-Hungarian fleet, and she would keep that distinction until after the turn of the century. She was, nevertheless, a political compromise, and was much smaller than foreign casemate ships, particularly British and French vessels.

Tegetthoff's career was rather limited, in large part due to significant problems with her engines. For the first decade of her career, she was assigned to the Active Squadron, and her crew could only keep her engines fully operational in the years 1883, 1887, and 1888. Tegetthoff and an Austro-Hungarian squadron that included the ironclads Custoza, Kaiser Max, Don Juan d'Austria, and Prinz Eugen and the torpedo cruisers Panther and Leopard traveled to Barcelona, Spain, in 1888 to take part in the opening ceremonies for the Barcelona Universal Exposition. This was the largest squadron of the Austro-Hungarian Navy that had operated outside the Adriatic. The same year, she participated in the annual fleet maneuvers in 1888, along with the ironclads Don Juan d'Austria, Kaiser Max, Prinz Eugen, and Custoza, and the cruisers Panther, Leopard, and Meteor, under the command of Rear Admiral Manfroni von Manfort.

In June and July 1889, Tegetthoff participated in fleet training exercises, which also included the ironclads Custoza, Erzherzog Albrecht, Kaiser Max, Prinz Eugen, and Don Juan d'Austria. In 1893–1894, she was modernized and had her propulsion system updated and her armament was replaced with newer guns. Her engines were replaced with more reliable models manufactured by the German firm Schichau-Werke. By this time, she was the only remotely modern ironclad in the Austrian fleet, apart from the two newly built barbette ships Kronprinz Erzherzog Rudolf and Kronprinzessin Erzherzogin Stephanie. Admiral Maximilian Daublebsky von Sterneck had replaced Pöck, and unable to secure funding for capital ships, instead tried to modernize the Austro-Hungarian fleet by embracing the Jeune École doctrine.

After 1897 she was used as a guard ship in Pola. During the summer maneuvers of June 1901, she served in the reserve squadron. The other major ships in the squadron included the new armored cruiser Kaiser Karl VI and the protected cruiser SMS Kaiser Franz Joseph I. In 1912 Tegetthoff was renamed Mars, so that her original name could be used on a new battleship launched that year. She remained in service as a guard ship after the outbreak of World War I in August 1914. In 1917, she was used as a school ship for midshipmen, and the following year she was reduced to a hulk. Following the end of World War I, the ship was surrendered to Italy, where she was broken up by 1920.
