= Kaiser Max-class ironclad (1862) =

Ironclad warship class of the Austro-Hungarian Navy

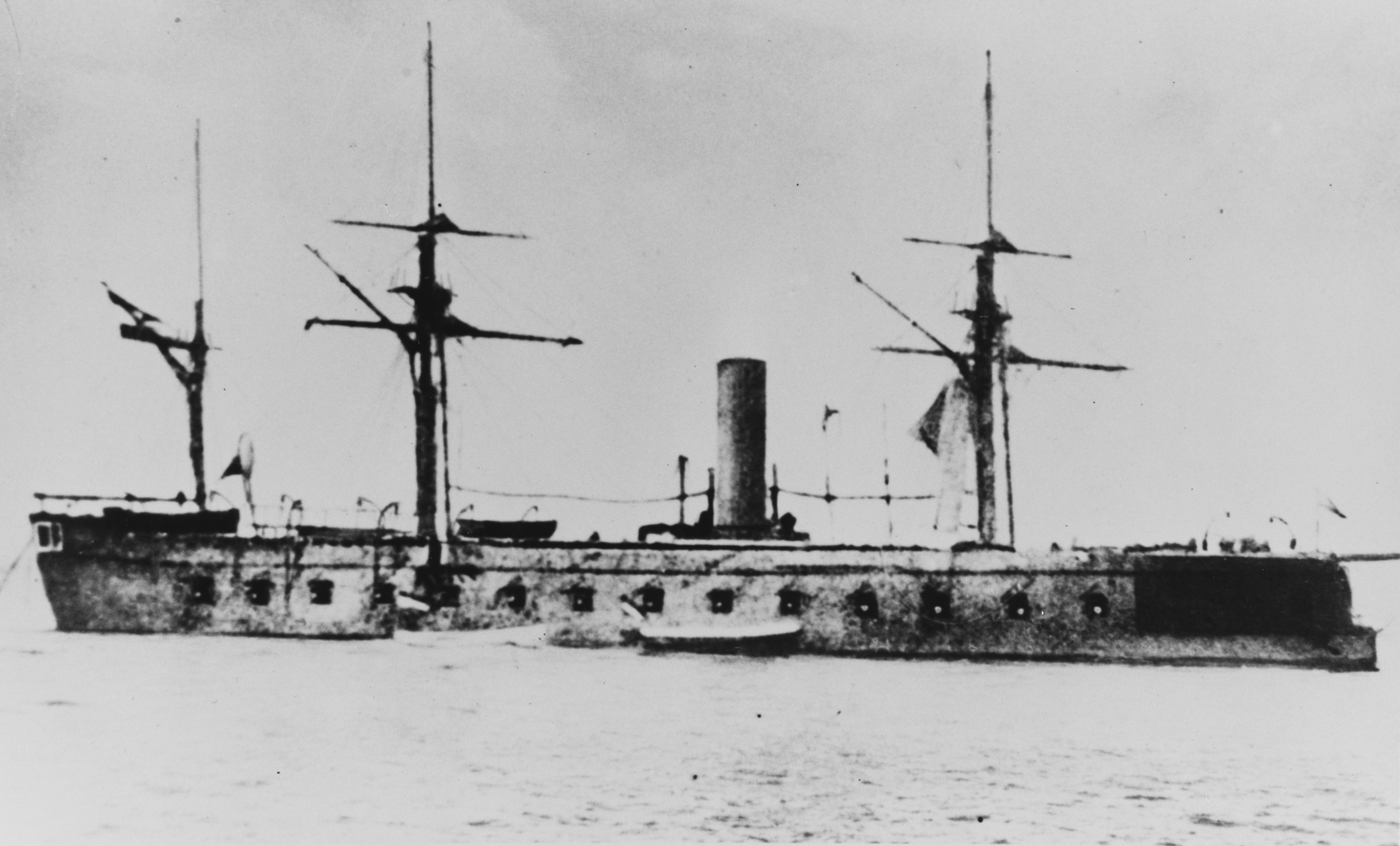
- Photo of Prinz Eugen before 1867

Class overview
- Operators: Austro-Hungarian Navy
- Preceded by: Drache class
- Succeeded by: Erzherzog Ferdinand Max class
- Built: 1861–1863
- In commission: 1863–1873
- Completed: 3
- Scrapped: 3

General characteristics
- Type: Ironclad warship
- Displacement: 3,588 long tons (3,646 t)
- Length: 70.78 m (232 ft 3 in) pp
- Beam: 10 m (32 ft 10 in)
- Draft: 6.32 m (20 ft 9 in)
- Installed power: 1,926 indicated horsepower (1,436 kW)
- Propulsion: 1 × marine steam engine; 1 × screw propeller
- Speed: 11.4 knots (21.1 km/h; 13.1 mph)
- Range: 1,200 nautical miles (2,200 km; 1,400 mi) at 10 knots (19 km/h; 12 mph)
- Crew: 386
- Armament: 16 × 48-pounder guns; 15 × 24-pounder guns; 1 × 12-pounder gun; 1 × 6-pounder gun
- Armor: Belt: 110 mm (4.3 in)

The Kaiser Max class of broadside ironclads was a group of three vessels built for the Austro-Hungarian Navy in the 1860s. The class consisted of Kaiser Max, the lead ship, Prinz Eugen, and Don Juan d'Austria. They were an improved version of the preceding Drache class, being larger, carrying a larger gun battery, and having more powerful engines. The three ships were all laid down in 1861, launched in 1862, and completed in 1863.

Don Juan d'Austria took part in the Second Schleswig War in 1864 but did not see combat. Two years later, Austria was attacked by Prussia and Italy in the Seven Weeks' War; a major naval engagement was fought against Italy at the Battle of Lissa in July 1866, where all three ships saw action. After the war, they were modernized, but did not see further active service. In poor condition by 1873, the Navy decided to discard the ships. But because parliament refused to budget funds to build replacements, the commander of the Navy, Friedrich von Pöck requested permission to "rebuild" the three Kaiser Maxes, which was granted. In fact, the three ships were broken up, with only their engines, armor plate, and some other equipment being reused in the new ships.

== Design ==
Following the launch of the French Gloire, the world's first ironclad warship, the Austrian Navy began a major ironclad construction program under the direction of Archduke Ferdinand Max, the Marinekommandant (naval commander) and brother of Kaiser Franz Josef I, the emperor of Austria. The first two ships, the Drache class, were ordered rather hastily in response to the construction of two similar vessels for the Royal Sardinian Navy in 1860, sparking the Austro-Italian ironclad arms race. The Kingdom of Sardinia soon unified most of Italy early the following year, and the expanded Italian Regia Marina (Royal Navy) became Austria's principal naval threat. But to secure funding for further expansion of the Austrian fleet to counter the growing strength of the Regia Marina, Ferdinand Max needed to convince the Reichsrat (Imperial Council) to authorize funds for more ships.

In early 1861, Ferdinand Max promulgated a memorandum laying out his construction proposal. In it, he argued that the advent of ironclad warships, which had rendered wooden ships obsolescent, had cleared the slate for the world's naval powers. By building a fleet of nine ironclads, Austria could achieve a fleet that was a third the size of the French Navy, then the second-largest fleet in the world. It would be more than capable of defeating the Regia Marina (under its known construction plans), and it would make Austria an attractive ally to Britain, France's traditional rival. For the 1862 fiscal year, Ferdinand Max requested funding for three new ironclads, and to convert the sail frigates SMS Novara and SMS Schwarzenberg to screw frigates. The Reichsrat rejected funding the proposal later in 1861, but in October, Franz Joseph intervened and authorized the navy to place orders for the new ships, which became the Kaiser Max class. These ships were designed by the Director of Naval Construction Josef von Romako; he based the design for the three new ships on the Drache class, but enlarged it and incorporated more powerful engines. The new ships also carried more guns.

=== General characteristics and machinery ===
The Kaiser Max-class ships were 70.78 meters (232 ft 3 in) long between perpendiculars; they had a beam of 10 m (32 ft 10 in) and an average draft of 6.32 m (20 ft 9 in). They displaced 3,588 long tons (3,646 t). Wooden hulled vessels, they proved to be very wet forward and had to have their bows rebuilt in 1867. Each ship originally had a bow figurehead, which was removed during the reconstruction. They were also very unstable ships, pitching badly and having very bad seakeeping. The ships had a crew of 386.

Their propulsion system consisted of one single-expansion, 2-cylinder, horizontal steam engine that drove a single screw propeller. The number and type of their coal-fired boilers have not survived, though they were trunked into a single funnel located amidships. The engines were rated 11 knots (20 km/h; 13 mph) from 1,900 indicated horsepower (1,400 kW); on trials, Kaiser Max slightly exceeded those figures, reaching 11.4 knots (21.1 km/h; 13.1 mph) from 1,926 ihp (1,436 kW). Don Juan d'Austria was capable of only 9 knots (17 km/h; 10 mph). They were fitted with a three-masted rig to supplement the steam engines.

=== Armament and armor ===
The ships of the Kaiser Max class were broadside ironclads. Kaiser Max and Prinz Eugen were armed with a main battery of sixteen 48-pounder muzzle-loading guns, while Don Juan d'Austria received fourteen of the guns. The ships also carried fifteen 24-pounder 15 cm (5.9 in) rifled muzzle-loading guns manufactured by Wahrendorff. They also carried two smaller guns, one 12-pounder and one 6-pounder. In 1867, the ships were rearmed with a battery of twelve 7 in (178 mm) muzzle-loaders manufactured by Armstrong and two 3 in (76 mm) guns. The ships' hulls were sheathed with wrought iron armor that was 110 mm (4.3 in) thick.

== Ships ==
Name	Builder	Laid down	Launched	Completed
Kaiser Max	Stabilimento Tecnico Triestino, Trieste	Oct 1861	14 March 1862	1863
Don Juan d'Austria	Stabilimento Tecnico Triestino, Trieste	Oct 1861	26 July 1862	1863
Prinz Eugen	Stabilimento Tecnico Triestino, Trieste	Oct 1861	14 June 1862	March 1863

== Service history ==
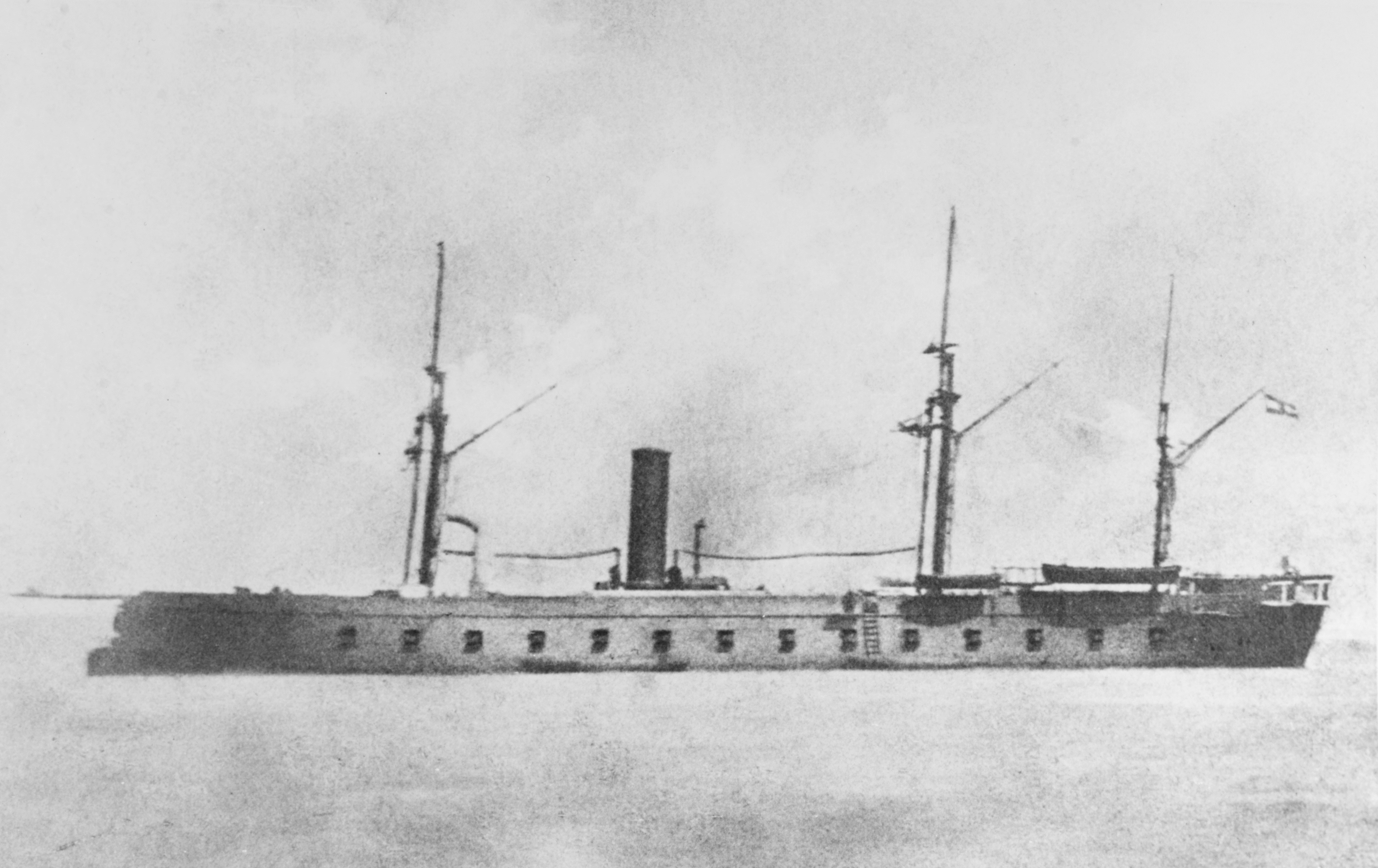
Illustration of Kaiser Max, c. 1866

During the Second Schleswig War of 1864, Don Juan d'Austria was deployed with the ship of the line Kaiser and two other vessels to the North Sea, but arrived too late to take part in any fighting, then-Commodore Wilhelm von Tegetthoff having already inflicted a strategic defeat on the Danish squadron at the Battle of Heligoland. All three ships saw action during the Seven Weeks' War that pitted Austria against Prussia and Italy two years later. The war at sea culminated at the Battle of Lissa in July 1866, where all three ships were heavily engaged, though they were not seriously damaged and inflicted little on their Italian opponents. Neither side's ships carried guns strong enough to defeat their opponents armor plating. After the war, the ships were disarmed and laid up.

In 1867, the ships were drydocked to correct some of their handling deficiencies, and install their new rifled guns. They did not return to active service after the work was completed, however. Severely reduced naval budgets owing to Hungarian disinterest—the Austrian Empire having been replaced by the Dual Monarchy in the postwar Ausgleich—in naval matters prevented the Austro-Hungarian fleet from taking an active policy. As the ships were badly rotted and thoroughly obsolete by the early 1870s, Rear Admiral Friedrich von Pöck, then the commander of the fleet, proposed that the ships be "rebuilt". The ships were in fact stricken from the naval register in 1873 and broken up for scrap, but the subterfuge allowed Pöck to build three new ships, also named Kaiser Max, Don Juan d'Austria, and Prinz Eugen, during a period where parliament steadfastly refused to approve funding for new ironclads. Some parts of the ships were reused, to include the engines but not the boilers, armor plate, and other miscellaneous equipment to save construction costs.
