= List of cruisers of Austria-Hungary =

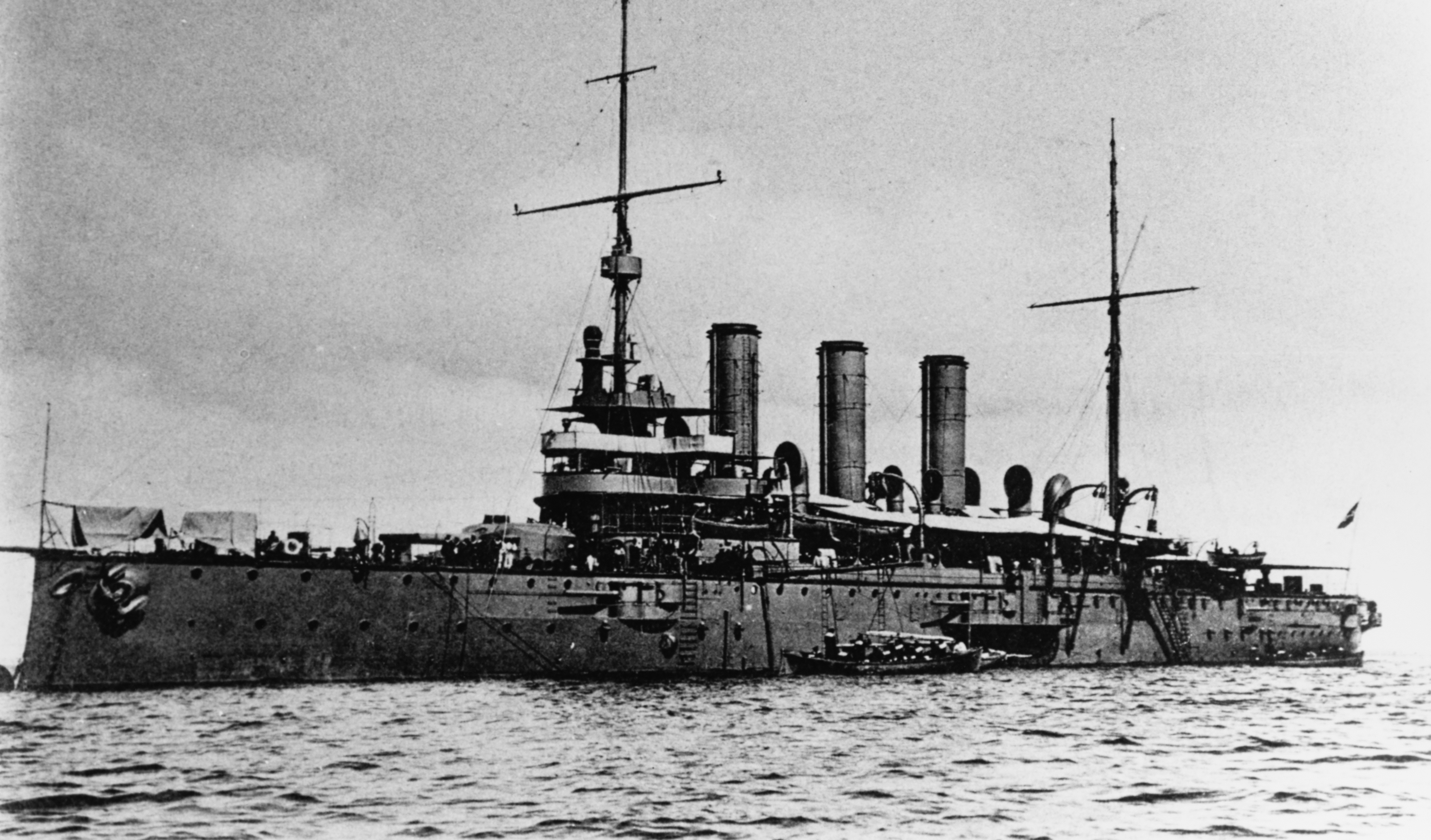
The armored cruiser SMS Kaiser Karl VI

Between the 1870s and 1910s, the Austro-Hungarian Navy built a series of cruisers of various types, including small torpedo cruisers, protected cruisers, fast scout cruisers and large armored cruisers. The first modern cruisers were the three Zara class begun in the late 1870s; a fourth vessel, Lussin, followed in the early 1880s. These ships proved to be unsatisfactory in service, and so to gain experience building effective vessels, the Navy ordered the two Panther-class cruisers from Britain. These were used as the basis for the domestically-built Tiger. Toward the end of the 1880s, the Navy shifted from building small torpedo cruisers to larger protected and armored cruisers, the first of which were the two Kaiser Franz Joseph I-class cruisers. These provided the basis for the armored cruisers Kaiserin und Königin Maria Theresia, Kaiser Karl VI, and Sankt Georg, built between 1891 and 1905.

In the mid-1890s, the three Zenta-class cruisers were built; these proved to be the last protected cruisers of the Austro-Hungarian fleet. In the mid-1900s, the Navy started building scout cruisers, starting with Admiral Spaun, which proved to be a disappointment owing to her unreliable engines. The subsequent design, the Novara class, rectified the problem and they shouldered much of the burden of the Adriatic Campaign during World War I. They were the last class of cruisers completed before the war, as the Ersatz Zenta class was cancelled after the outbreak of hostilities, just two months after they had been authorized.

Key
| Armament | The number and type of the primary armament |
| Armor | The thickness of the belt or deck armor |
| Displacement | Ship displacement at full combat load |
| Propulsion | Number of shafts, type of propulsion system, and top speed/horsepower generated |
| Service | The dates work began and finished on the ship and its ultimate fate |
| Laid down | The date the keel began to be assembled |
| Commissioned | The date the ship was commissioned |

== Torpedo cruisers ==
=== Zara class ===
Zara early in her career

Unable to secure funding for new ironclad warships, Vice Admiral Friedrich von Pöck, the Marinekommandant (Navy Commander) of the Austro-Hungarian Navy, resorted to developing less expensive torpedo cruisers armed with the new Whitehead torpedoes that had been developed in Austria-Hungary in the 1860s as a way to strengthen the fleet. The design staff considered a number of designs, ranging from large, heavily-armored vessels with torpedoes and large-caliber guns, to small ships armed only with torpedoes. They ultimately settled on smaller vessels that were modeled on the German aviso Zieten, which had proven to be a success for the Imperial German Navy. The new ships were to serve as fleet scouts and flotilla leaders for smaller torpedo boats. Josef von Romako, the Austro-Hungarian chief naval architect, prepared the design, which ultimately failed to meet expectations, primarily the result of an insufficiently high speed.

The three Zaras saw little active use during their careers, since their low speed precluded them from being used in their intended roles. Instead, they spent most of their existence in reserve, being reactivated periodically for exercises. The only major operation in which any members of the class participated came in 1897 during the Greco-Turkish War, where Sebenico was sent to enforce a blockade of the island as part of an international squadron. They were used as training ships during this period, until the start of World War I in July 1914, when they became harbor guard ships. The ships saw no action during the war, though Zara was badly damaged by a mine in 1917. All three vessels were surrendered to Italy after the conflict as war prizes and were then broken up.

| Ship | Armament | Armor | Displacement | Propulsion | Service | | |
| Ship | Armament | Armor | Displacement | Propulsion | Laid down | Commissioned | Fate |
|---|---|---|---|---|---|---|---|
| SMS Zara | 4 × 9 cm (3.5 in) guns 3 × 35 cm (13.8 in) torpedo tubes | — | 838 long tons (851 t) | | 1 August 1878 | 13 June 1881 | Ceded to Italy as a war prize, scrapped in 1920 |
| SMS Spalato | 4 × 9 cm (3.5 in) guns 3 × 35 cm (13.8 in) torpedo tubes | — | 838 long tons (851 t) | | September 1878 | September 1881 | Ceded to Italy as a war prize, scrapped in 1920 |
| SMS Sebenico | 4 × 9 cm guns 1 × 35 cm torpedo tube | — | 882.6 long tons (896.8 t) | | 29 November 1880 | December 1882 | Ceded to Italy as a war prize, scrapped in 1920 |

=== Lussin ===
Lussin early in her career

Pöck ordered a fourth torpedo cruiser, which Romako designed while Zara was undergoing sea trials. He used the Zaras as the basic starting point, but lengthened the hull to incorporate finer lines and thus improved hydrodynamics and included a more powerful engine. Projected to reach a speed of 17 knots (31 km/h; 20 mph), Lussin failed to reach her intended speed owing to problems with her propulsion system; her boilers did not produce sufficient power and her engine room was poorly ventilated. By the time Lussin entered service, Pöck had died and his successor, Maximilian Daublebsky von Sterneck, decided to order future torpedo cruisers from more experienced foreign shipyards.

Lussin took part in an international blockade of Greece in 1886 as part of an attempt by the Great Powers to stop a war between Greece and the Ottoman Empire. Like the Zaras, her slow speed prevented her from being used as intended, and after spending most of the next three years out of service, in 1889 she was reduced to a training ship. She saw limited activity in the annual fleet maneuvers into the early 1900s. Between 1903 and 1909, she served as the station ship for Teodo. She was rebuilt into an admiralty yacht between 1909 and 1913. During World War I, she was used as a barracks ship for German U-boat crews in Pola. She was seized by Italy, renamed Sorrento, and modernized for use as a depot ship for MAS boats, serving in that role until 1928, when she was broken up.

| Ship | Armament | Armor | Displacement | Propulsion | Service | | |
| Ship | Armament | Armor | Displacement | Propulsion | Laid down | Commissioned | Fate |
|---|---|---|---|---|---|---|---|
| SMS Lussin | 4 × 15 cm (5.9 in) guns 1 × 35 cm torpedo tube | Deck: 19 mm (0.75 in) | 995.25 long tons (1,011.22 t) | | | | Ceded to Italy as a war prize, commissioned as Sorrento, scrapped after 1928 |

=== Panther class ===
Panther in port

By the time Sterneck became the head of the Austro-Hungarian Navy in 1884, the fleet was technologically backward as a result of chronic under-funding. The refusal of the Imperial Council of Austria and the Diet of Hungary to grant larger naval budgets forced Sterneck to continue Pöck's policy of pursuing cheaper methods to defend the Austro-Hungarian coast, including torpedo cruisers. He requested authorization to build three new cruisers, which Kaiser Franz Josef I approved that year. As the domestically produced Zara and Lussin designs had been failures, Sterneck opted to order the two ships of the Panther class from the British shipbuilder Armstrong Whitworth. The Austro-Hungarian naval architect Siegfried Popper was sent to oversee the project to gain experience in designing ships of the type. They were the first cruiser-type ships of the Austro-Hungarian fleet to discard sailing rigs. The decision to build a force of torpedo-armed warships instead of capital ships represented a doctrinal shift led by Sterneck away from traditional theories to the Jeune École (Young School), which favored smaller, cheaper vessels.

Both vessels were successful additions to the Austro-Hungarian Navy, operating with the main fleet for their first years in service; they also conducted several long-distance training voyages. In 1896, Panther was sent on a major training cruise to the Pacific Ocean in 1896 and Leopard joined the international squadron off Crete in 1897. Both ships made several voyages to Asia and Africa over the next decade, and one of the ships was on station in East Asian waters at all times between 1907 and 1910. They served with the Coastal Defense Special Group during World War I and Panther bombarded Montenegrin forces in 1916. Britain seized both ships as war prizes and sold to them ship breakers in Italy in 1920.

| Ship | Armament | Armor | Displacement | Propulsion | Service | | |
| Ship | Armament | Armor | Displacement | Propulsion | Laid down | Commissioned | Fate |
|---|---|---|---|---|---|---|---|
| SMS Panther | 4 × 12 cm guns 4 × 35.6 cm (14 in) torpedo tubes | Deck: 12 mm (0.47 in) | 1,557 long tons (1,582 t) | Two compound steam engines, 18 knots (33 km/h; 21 mph) | 29 October 1884 | 31 December 1885 | Ceded to Britain as a war prize, scrapped in 1920 |
| SMS Leopard | 4 × 12 cm guns 4 × 35.6 cm (14 in) torpedo tubes | Deck: 12 mm (0.47 in) | 1,557 long tons (1,582 t) | Two compound steam engines, 18 knots (33 km/h; 21 mph) | January 1885 | 31 March 1886 | Ceded to Britain as a war prize, scrapped in 1920 |

=== Tiger ===
Tiger shortly after her completion

Having secured experience with the Panther class, Sterneck ordered the third of his projected cruisers to be built domestically. In 1885, Popper was tasked with designing the vessel that was to be based on the Panthers with modest improvements. The hull was lengthened to incorporate finer lines, which gave the ship a slightly higher top speed than the Panthers (though both designs were nominally 18-knot ships, Tiger exceeded her design speed by more than a knot on trials). She carried the same armament as the Panther-class, albeit with domestically-produced 35 cm torpedo tubes instead of the slightly larger 35.6 cm tubes of the British-built ships.

Tiger served with the fleet for the first several years of her career, and in 1890 took part in a major cruise to visit Germany, Great Britain, and other countries in northern Europe. She was overhauled in 1896 and participated in the international squadron at Crete in 1897. Between 1905 and 1906, she was converted into a yacht and was then renamed Lacroma. In 1916, she was reduced to a barracks ship in Pola for German U-boat crews In the final days of the war, the Austro-Hungarian Navy attempted to transfer more modern vessels, including Lacroma, to the State of Slovenes, Croats and Serbs to avoid their seizure by the Allies. The ship was nevertheless taken by Italy as a prize, thereafter being scrapped in 1920.

| Ship | Armament | Armor | Displacement | Propulsion | Service | | |
| Ship | Armament | Armor | Displacement | Propulsion | Laid down | Commissioned | Fate |
|---|---|---|---|---|---|---|---|
| SMS Tiger | 4 × 12 cm guns 4 × 35 cm torpedo tubes | — | 1,657 to 1,680 long tons (1,684 to 1,707 t) | Two compound steam engines, 18 kn | 5 October 1886 | March 1888 | Ceded to Italy as a war prize, scrapped in 1920 |

== Protected cruisers ==
=== Kaiser Franz Joseph I class ===
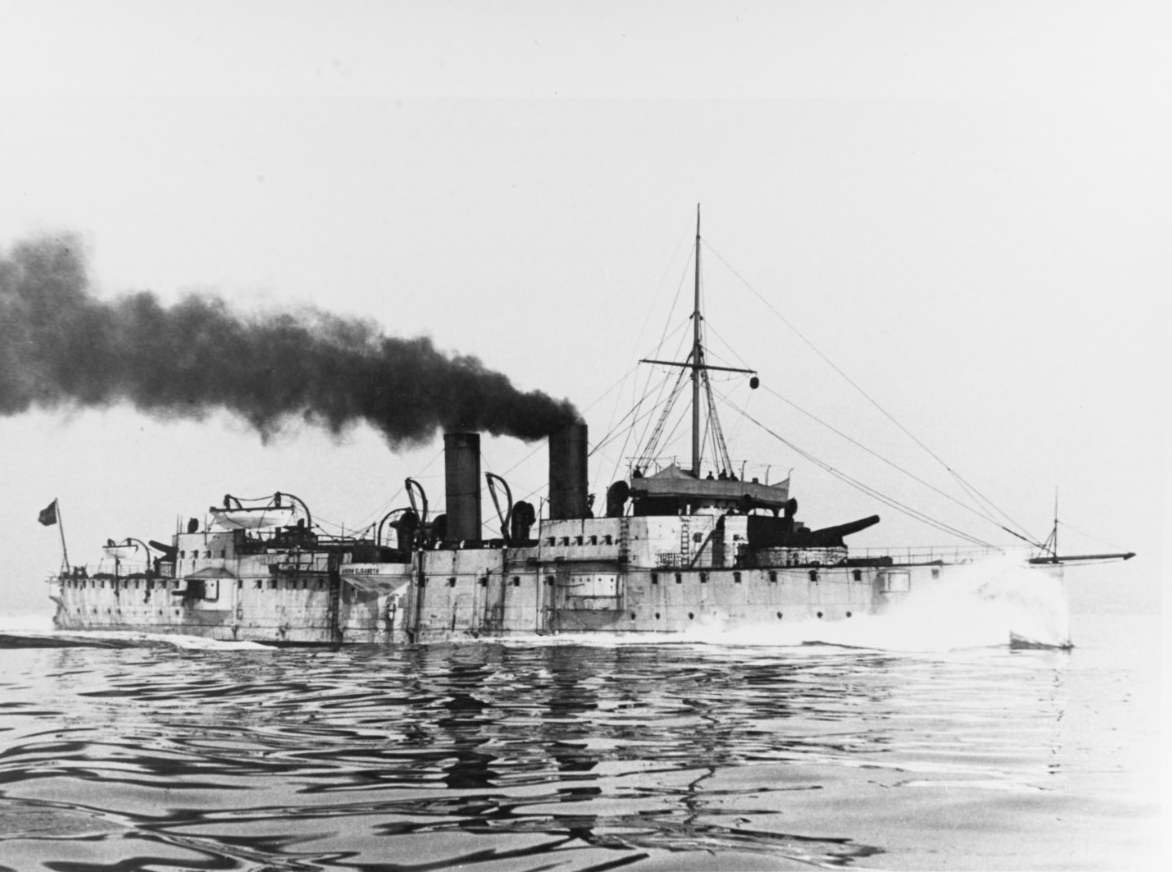
Kaiserin Elisabeth conducting sea trials

During the design process for the Panther class, Sterneck predicted that larger vessels, of around 3,500 long tons (3,600 t) and armed with large-caliber guns, would be necessary in the future. Having secured approval for the three torpedo cruisers, he next requested funding for a pair of vessels to meet the requirements for the larger vessels. His design was modeled on the Italian protected cruisers Giovanni Bausan and the Etna class; the Austrian and Hungarian parliaments were pleased at the low cost of the vessels—half that of contemporary ironclad warships—and authorized two vessels for the 1888 and 1889 fiscal year to replace the obsolete ironclads Lissa and Kaiser. Like their Italian counterparts, Kaiser Franz Joseph I and Kaiserin Elisabeth carried a pair of 24 cm (9.4 in) guns in open barbettes to give them the ability to engage hostile capital ships, while retaining the high speed necessary to operate with the torpedo cruisers. In service, the ships proved to be incapable of performing the duties Sterneck envisioned, and moreover the Jeune École doctrine had fallen out of favor; while a third member of the class had been authorized, it was never built.

After entering service in 1890, Kaiser Franz Joseph I served with the fleet in home waters, including the voyage to northern Europe with Tiger in 1890, while Kaiserin Elisabeth made a circumnavigation of the globe in 1892–1893 with Archduke Franz Ferdinand aboard. Both ships visited Germany for the opening of the Kaiser Wilhelm Canal in 1895. Kaiser Franz Joseph I went to East Asia in 1897 before returning to take part in the international squadron off Crete and Kaiserin Elisabeth was sent to China to help suppress the Boxer Uprising in 1899. After the rebellion, Austria-Hungary received a concession in Tianjin, which prompted the Navy to keep one of the two members of the class on station through the 1910s. Kaiserin Elisabeth was there at the start of World War I and she moved to join German forces in Qingdao; during the ensuing siege, she was disarmed to strengthen the land defenses of the port and her crew went ashore to fight as infantry. The ship was ultimately scuttled to avoid capture by the Allied forces. Kaiser Franz Joseph I, meanwhile, was used as a guard ship in Cattaro Bay for the duration of the war. After the Cattaro Mutiny in early 1918, the vessel was reduced to a barracks ship. She sank in Cattaro Bay in 1919 before she had been allocated to the Allies, and was eventually scrapped in 1967.

| Ship | Armament | Armor | Displacement | Propulsion | Service | | |
| Ship | Armament | Armor | Displacement | Propulsion | Laid down | Commissioned | Fate |
|---|---|---|---|---|---|---|---|
| SMS Kaiser Franz Joseph I | 2 × 24 cm (9.4 in) K L/35 guns | Belt: 57 mm (2.2 in) | 4,494 long tons (4,566 t) | Two triple-expansion engines, 19 kn (35 km/h; 22 mph) | 3 January 1888 | 2 July 1890 | Ceded to France as a war prize, foundered in 1919 |
| SMS Kaiserin Elisabeth | 2 × 24 cm (9.4 in) K L/35 guns | Belt: 57 mm (2.2 in) | 4,494 long tons (4,566 t) | Two triple-expansion engines, 19 kn (35 km/h; 22 mph) | July 1888 | 21 January 1892 | Scuttled in Qingdao, 2 November 1914 |

=== Zenta class ===
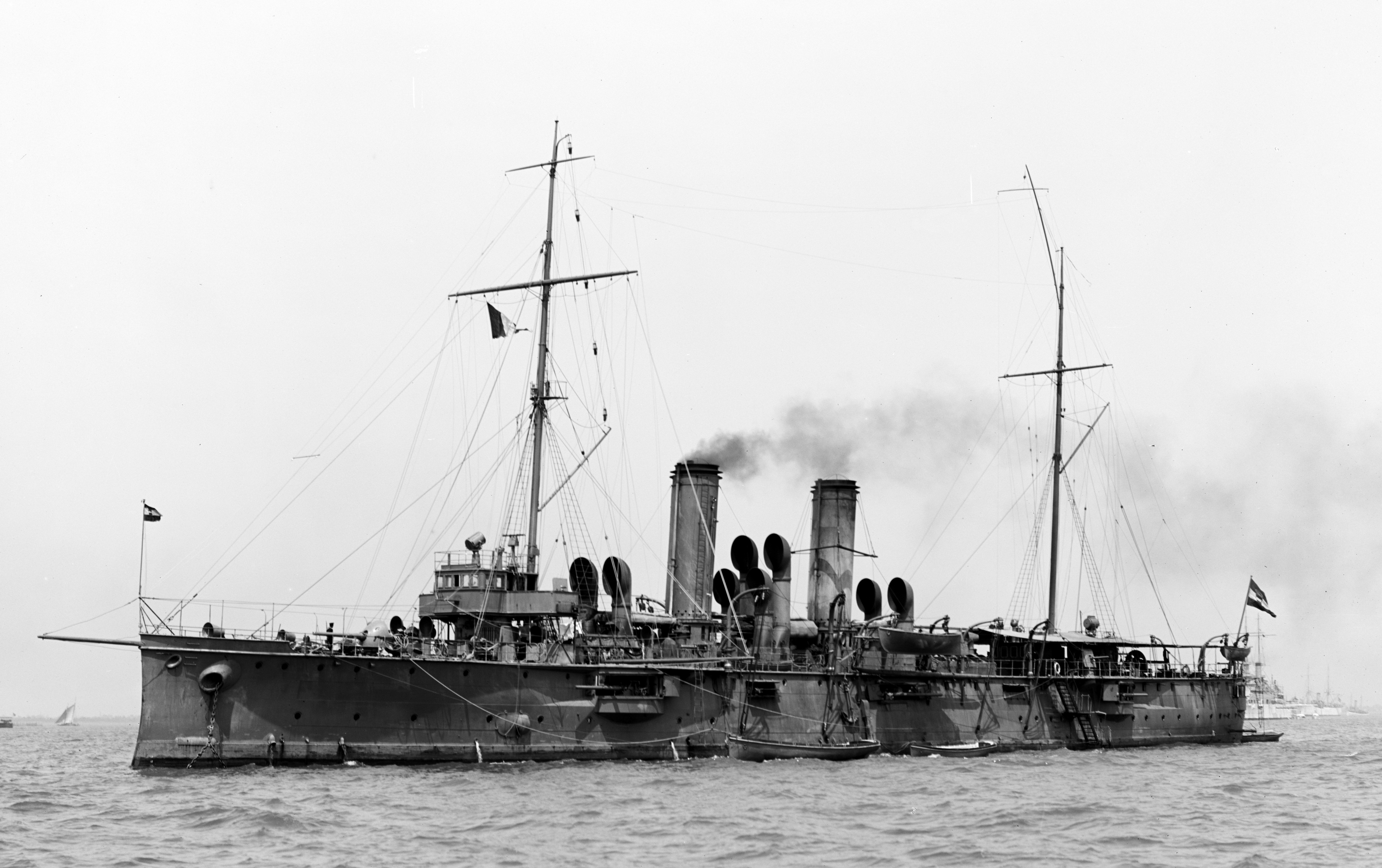
Aspern during her visit to the United States in 1907

| Ship | Armament | Armor | Displacement | Propulsion | Service | | |
| Ship | Armament | Armor | Displacement | Propulsion | Laid down | Commissioned | Fate |
|---|---|---|---|---|---|---|---|
| SMS Zenta | 8 × 12 cm (4.7 in) guns | Belt: 25 mm (0.98 in) | 2,503 to 2,625 long tons (2,543 to 2,667 t) | Two triple expansion engines, 20.8 kn (38.5 km/h; 23.9 mph) | 8 August 1896 | 28 May 1899 | Sunk at the Battle of Antivari, 16 August 1914 |
| SMS Aspern | 8 × 12 cm (4.7 in) guns | Belt: 25 mm (0.98 in) | 2,503 to 2,625 long tons (2,543 to 2,667 t) | Two triple expansion engines, 20.8 kn (38.5 km/h; 23.9 mph) | 4 October 1897 | 29 May 1900 | Ceded to Britain as a war prize, scrapped in 1920 |
| SMS Szigetvár | 8 × 12 cm (4.7 in) guns | Belt: 25 mm (0.98 in) | 2,503 to 2,625 long tons (2,543 to 2,667 t) | Two triple expansion engines, 20.8 kn (38.5 km/h; 23.9 mph) | 25 May 1899 | 30 September 1901 | Ceded to Britain as a war prize, scrapped in 1920 |

== Armored cruisers ==
=== Kaiserin und Königin Maria Theresia ===
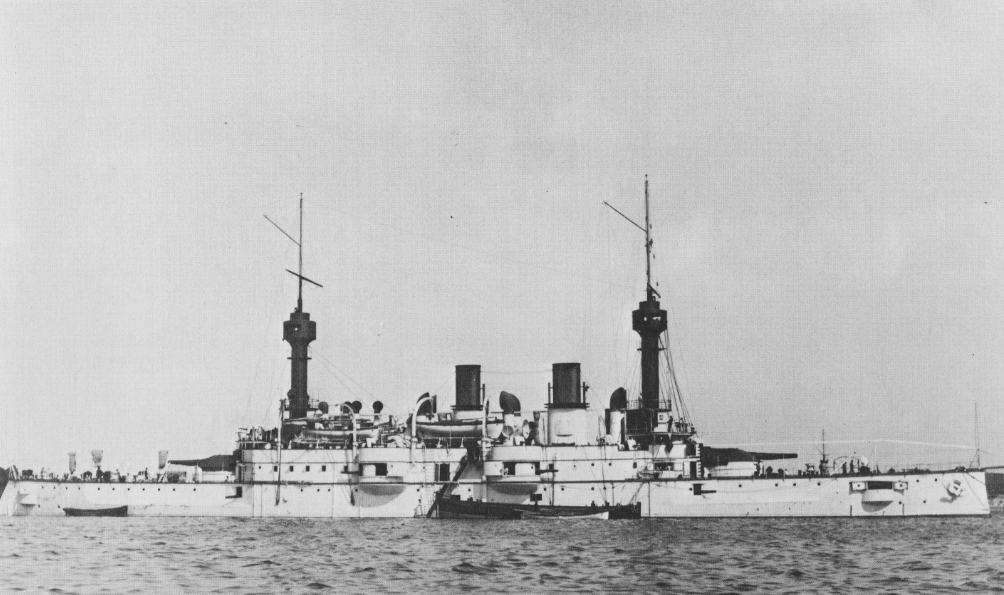
Kaiserin und Königin Maria Theresia c. 1898–1900

After the Kaiser Franz Joseph I class of protected cruisers had entered service and proved to be disappointments, the Austro-Hungarian Navy decided abandon the Jeune École doctrine and return to traditional fleet plans centered on large, heavily armored vessels. The first of these became the armored cruiser Kaiserin und Königin Maria Theresia. The new ship was intended to fill some of the roles of a battleship, because the chronically small naval budgets prevented the Navy from building as many capital ships as it wanted. The Navy solicited designs from five British shipyards, but ultimately awarded the contract to the domestic firm Stabilimento Tecnico Triestino. The ship was initially to be armed with a battery of six 15 cm (5.9 in) guns, but the armament was increased by two of those guns, along with a pair of 24-centimeter (9.4 in) guns.

Early in the ship's career, she was frequently sent abroad, including a trip to Germany for the opening of the Kaiser Wilhelm Canal in 1895. In 1898, she was sent to Cuba to evacuate Austro-Hungarian nationals during the Spanish–American War; while there, she was nearly attacked by American warships who mistook her for the similarly-named Spanish cruiser Infanta Maria Teresa. She participated in the European suppression of the Boxer Uprising in China in 1901. During World War I she was used as a guard ship in Šibenik until 1916, when she became a barracks ship. After Austria-Hungary's defeat, she was awarded to Britain as a war prize and was broken up for scrap in 1920.

| Ship | Armament | Armor | Displacement | Propulsion | Service | | |
| Ship | Armament | Armor | Displacement | Propulsion | Laid down | Commissioned | Fate |
|---|---|---|---|---|---|---|---|
| SMS Kaiserin und Königin Maria Theresia | 2 × 24 cm K L/35 guns | Belt: 100 mm (3.9 in) | 6,026 long tons (6,123 t) | Two triple-expansion engines, 19.35 knots (36 km/h; 22 mph) | 1 July 1891 | November 1894 | Ceded to Britain as a war prize, scrapped in 1920 |

=== Kaiser Karl VI ===
Kaiser Karl VI in 1917

The follow-on to Kaiserin und Königin Maria Theresia was based heavily on that ship, the primary improvements being significantly strengthened armor protection and a newer model of 24 cm gun, along with more powerful machinery that gave a knot and a half increase in speed.

Kaiser Karl VI served with the main fleet for the majority of her active career. In 1910, she made a major trans-Atlantic cruise to represent Austria-Hungary at Argentina's centennial celebration of the country's independence. During World War I, the ship participated in the defense of Cattaro Bay, which included a length artillery duel between Kaiser Karl VI and other Austro-Hungarian warships and Montenegrin and French artillery batteries in the heights around the port. Kaiser Karl VI was at the center of the Cattaro Mutiny in January 1918 that culminated in the execution of four of the ringleaders, along with the decommissioning of Kaiser Karl VI and the dispersal of her restive crew. Like her predecessor, she was awarded to Britain after the war and sold for scrap in Italy.

| Ship | Armament | Armor | Displacement | Propulsion | Service | | |
| Ship | Armament | Armor | Displacement | Propulsion | Laid down | Commissioned | Fate |
|---|---|---|---|---|---|---|---|
| SMS Kaiser Karl VI | 2 × 24 cm K L/40 guns | Belt: 220 mm (8.7 in) | 6,864 long tons (6,974 t) | Two triple-expansion engines, 20.83 knots (38.58 km/h; 23.97 mph) | 1 June 1896 | 23 May 1900 | Ceded to Britain as a war prize, scrapped in 1920 |

=== Sankt Georg ===
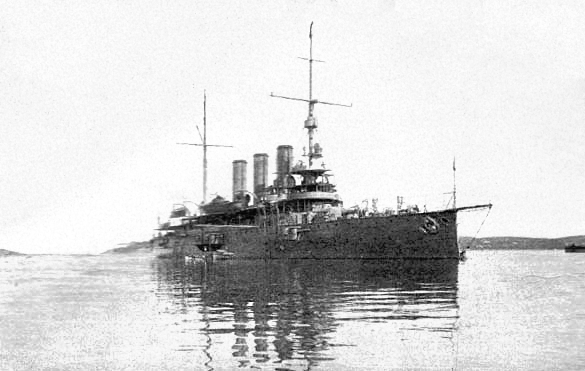
Sankt Georg, c. 1914

The third and final armored cruiser, Sankt Georg, was another iterative improvement on the previous vessels. The ship carried a much more powerful secondary battery that included five 19 cm (7.5 in) guns in place of four of the 15 cm guns. She also had new engines that gave her over a knot increase in speed over Kaiser Karl VI.

Like her predecessor, Sankt Georg served with the fleet for the bulk of her career. In 1907, she visited the United States with the protected cruiser Aspern. During World War I, she was based in Cattaro with the most modern cruisers of the fleet, though she was too slow to take an active role in the raids against Entente forces. She sortied in May 1917 to rescue the three Novara-class cruisers during the Battle of the Strait of Otranto; her appearance forced the British and Italian vessels pursuing the Novaras to break off the chase. Sankt Georg was also involved in the Cattaro Mutiny, during which her captain was killed by the mutineers. After the war, she was surrendered to Britain and scrapped in Italy.

| Ship | Armament | Armor | Displacement | Propulsion | Service | | |
| Ship | Armament | Armor | Displacement | Propulsion | Laid down | Commissioned | Fate |
|---|---|---|---|---|---|---|---|
| SMS Sankt Georg | 2 × 24 cm K L/40 guns | Belt: 210 mm (8.3 in) | 8,070 long tons (8,200 t) | Two triple-expansion engines, 22 knots (41 km/h; 25 mph) | 11 March 1901 | 21 July 1905 | Ceded to Britain as a war prize, scrapped in 1920 |

== Scout cruisers ==
=== Admiral Spaun ===
Admiral Spaun at sea

In the early 1900s, Austria-Hungary entered a brief hiatus in cruiser construction; on 1 May 1906, a set of design requirements was issued for a new design. The ship was to displace 3,500 t (3,400 long tons; 3,900 short tons) normally, and should be faster than contemporary cruisers of foreign navies. It should also have slightly better armor protection, which necessitated a weaker armament. The design, which was finalized by 1908, also incorporated steam turbines, the first time the new type of engines were used in a major Austro-Hungarian warship.

Admiral Spaun's turbines proved to be very difficult in service, which greatly reduced her activity during the war. Without a reliable propulsion system, she could not join the three Novaras on their raids in the southern Adriatic, but she still saw action in less dangerous operations. After the war, she was ceded to Britain for reparations and was broken up in Italy in 1920.

| Ship | Armament | Armor | Displacement | Propulsion | Service | | |
| Ship | Armament | Armor | Displacement | Propulsion | Laid down | Commissioned | Fate |
|---|---|---|---|---|---|---|---|
| SMS Admiral Spaun | 7 × 10-centimeter (3.9 in) guns | Belt: 60 mm (2.4 in) | 4,000 long tons (4,100 t) | Six steam turbines, 27.07 kn (50.13 km/h; 31.15 mph) | 30 May 1908 | 15 November 1910 | Ceded to Britain as a war prize, scrapped in 1920 |

=== Novara class ===
Saida underway in 1914

The next three cruisers built by Austria-Hungary were iterative developments of Admiral Spaun, the primary improvements being more powerful turbines that allowed fewer engines to be used and a strengthened gun battery. The weight savings from the reduced number of turbines was also used to reinforce the hull structure. Unlike Admiral Spaun, the Novaras' engines were very reliable and provided a high speed that proved to be very useful during the war. As a result, they formed the backbone of the naval war in the Adriatic, conducting a number of raids against enemy forces in the southern Adriatic. These culminated in the Battle of the Strait of Otranto in May 1917, the largest naval battle of the Adriatic Campaign.

After the war, all three ships were surrendered to the Entente, with Saida and Helgoland going to Italy as Venezia and Brindisi, respectively, and Novara to France as Thionville. They served in the navies of their respective owners into the early 1930s, when they were withdrawn from service, thereafter being used for subsidiary duties. The two Italian ships were scrapped in 1937, but Thionville survived as a barracks ship until 1941, when she too was broken up.

| Ship | Armament | Armor | Displacement | Propulsion | Service | | |
| Ship | Armament | Armor | Displacement | Propulsion | Laid down | Commissioned | Fate |
|---|---|---|---|---|---|---|---|
| SMS Saida | 9 × 10 cm guns | Belt: 60 mm | 4,017 long tons (4,081 t) | Two steam turbines, 27 knots (50 km/h; 31 mph) | 9 September 1911 | 1 August 1914 | Ceded to Italy as a war prize, commissioned as Venezia, scrapped in 1937 |
| SMS Helgoland | 9 × 10 cm guns | Belt: 60 mm | 4,017 long tons (4,081 t) | Two steam turbines, 27 knots (50 km/h; 31 mph) | 28 October 1911 | 5 September 1914 | Ceded to Italy as a war prize, commissioned as Brindisi, scrapped in 1937 |
| SMS Novara | 9 × 10 cm guns | Belt: 60 mm | 4,017 long tons (4,081 t) | Two steam turbines, 27 knots (50 km/h; 31 mph) | 9 December 1912 | 10 January 1915 | Ceded to France as a war prize, commissioned as Thionville, scrapped in 1941 |

== Light cruisers ==
=== Ersatz Zenta class ===
As tensions in Europe rose in the early 1910s from the Italo-Turkish War and the Balkan Wars, Vice Admiral Anton Haus, the new Marinekommandant, was able to use the growing risk of war to convince the government to fund a large construction program in 1913 that included three new scout cruisers. Since they were intended to replace the aging Zenta class, the first vessel was designated Ersatz Zenta. The budget was approved on 28 May 1914, with work on the first vessel slated to begin on 1 July. The new ships were based on experience gained from the preceding Novara-class cruisers, though a greater emphasis was placed on armament, with a greater number and caliber of main guns. The outbreak of World War I just two months after their authorization delayed their keel laying. The other two were to have followed on 1 July 1915, but work never began on any of the ships. All building projects were suspended in August 1914, to be completed after the successful conclusion of the war.

In December 1915, the Navy's high command requested that the design be reworked to incorporate the wartime experience of the Austro-Hungarian fleet and its German allies. The design was radically changed, with the original 12 cm guns replaced with a pair of 19 cm (7.5 in) guns and six or eight 15 cm (5.9 in) guns. Belt armor was also considerably strengthened, to 150 mm (5.9 in), as actions with British and French warships had demonstrated the smaller gun to be insufficiently powerful. Work never started on the new design either, as most of the shipyard workers who were to have built them had been drafted into the Austro-Hungarian Army.

| Ship | Armament | Armor | Displacement | Propulsion | Service | | |
| Ship | Armament | Armor | Displacement | Propulsion | Laid down | Commissioned | Fate |
|---|---|---|---|---|---|---|---|
| K | 14 × 12 cm guns | Belt: 20 mm (0.79 in) | 5,611 long tons (5,701 t) | Two steam turbines, 30.1 kn (55.7 km/h; 34.6 mph) | — | — | Work never begun |
| L | 14 × 12 cm guns | Belt: 20 mm (0.79 in) | 5,611 long tons (5,701 t) | Two steam turbines, 30.1 kn (55.7 km/h; 34.6 mph) | — | — | Work never begun |
| M | 14 × 12 cm guns | Belt: 20 mm (0.79 in) | 5,611 long tons (5,701 t) | Two steam turbines, 30.1 kn (55.7 km/h; 34.6 mph) | — | — | Work never begun |

== See also ==
- List of battleships of Austria-Hungary
- List of ironclad warships of Austria-Hungary
- List of ships of Austria-Hungary
