= SMS Lussin =

Torpedo cruiser of the Austro-Hungarian Navy

- SMS Lussin early in her career

Class overview
- Preceded by: Zara class
- Succeeded by: Panther class

History

Austro-Hungarian Empire
- Name: Lussin
- Builder: Stabilimento Tecnico Triestino
- Laid down: September 1882
- Launched: 22 December 1883
- Completed: 12 July 1884
- Fate: Ceded to Italy, 1920

History

Italy
- Name: Sorrento
- Acquired: 1920
- Commissioned: 11 September 1924
- Stricken: 1928
- Fate: Broken up

General characteristics
- Type: Torpedo cruiser
- Displacement: 1,011.17 metric tons (995.20 long tons; 1,114.62 short tons) normal; 1,122.5 t (1,104.8 long tons; 1,237.3 short tons) full load
- Length: 79.75 meters (261 ft 8 in) loa
- Beam: 8.42 m (27 ft 7 in)
- Draft: 4.06 m (13 ft 4 in)
- Installed power: five cylindrical boilers; 1,767.5 PS (1,743.3 ihp)
- Propulsion: 2 × compound steam engines
- Speed: 12.95 knots (23.98 km/h; 14.90 mph)
- Range: 850 nautical miles (1,570 km; 980 mi) at 11 knots (20 km/h; 13 mph)
- Armament: 2 × 15 cm (5.9 in) guns; 1 × 66 mm (2.6 in)/18 landing gun; 1 × 13.8 in (350 mm) torpedo tube
- Armor: Deck: 19 mm (0.75 in)

SMS Lussin was a torpedo cruiser of the Austro-Hungarian Navy, a modified version of the preceding Zara class. As envisaged by the Marinekommandant (Navy Commander), Vice Admiral Friedrich von Pöck, Lussin would be the leader of a flotilla of torpedo boats, with the additional capability of carrying out scouting duties. The ship proved to be too slow and too lightly armed for either of these tasks, so she spent the majority of her career as a training ship for engine and boiler room personnel, along with occasional stints with the main fleet for training exercises. She took part in only one significant operation, an international blockade of Greece in 1886 to prevent the country from declaring war on the Ottoman Empire. In 1910–1913, Lussin was rebuilt as an admiralty yacht, and she spent World War I as a barracks ship for German U-boat crews based in Pola. After the war, she was ceded to Italy as a war prize, renamed Sorrento, and briefly saw service as a mother ship for MAS boats from 1924 to 1928, when she was discarded.

== Design ==
In the early 1880s, Vice Admiral Friedrich von Pöck, the head of the Marinesektion (Admiralty), ordered four torpedo cruisers. Pöck was unable to secure funding for new ironclads, and so he turned to less expensive vessels to modernize the fleet. The ships would fill several roles, including scouting for the ironclad fleet and leading flotillas of torpedo boats. The first three of the new vessels—the Zara class—were built to the same basic design.

While SMS Zara was still undergoing sea trials, Josef von Romako began design work on a fourth cruiser, along with the engineer A. Waldvogel. Romako outlined his plan in a meeting with the design staff on 10 June 1881. The new ship was to have a longer hull for finer lines, particularly in the aft part of the hull, to allow it to reach higher speeds. The preceding Zara-class cruisers had been unable to reach their design speed, so Romako hoped to rectify the problem with Lussin. The longer hull, with a propulsion system rated at 3,600 metric horsepower (3,600 ihp) should produce a top speed of 17 knots (31 km/h; 20 mph) according to Waldvogel. After lengthy negotiations, The Marinesektion assigned construction of the ship to Stabilimento Tecnico Triestino on 22 September 1881.

As neither Lussin or the earlier Zara-class cruisers met the requirements of the Marinesektion, Vice Admiral Maximilian Daublebsky von Sterneck, who had replaced Pöck in November 1883, decided that further torpedo cruisers would be ordered from more experienced, foreign shipyards. The first of these new vessels, the Panther class, were ordered from the British firm Armstrong Whitworth in 1884.

=== Characteristics ===
Lussin was 79.75 meters (261 ft 8 in) long overall and 69.9 m (229 ft) long between perpendiculars. She had a beam of 8.42 m (27 ft 7 in) and a draft of 4.06 m (13 ft 4 in) normally and 4.3 m (14 ft 1 in) fully loaded. She displaced 1,011.17 metric tons (995.20 long tons; 1,114.62 short tons) as designed and up to 1,122.5 t (1,104.8 long tons; 1,237.3 short tons) fully laden.

Propulsion was supplied by two 2-cylinder compound steam engines with five cylindrical boilers, producing 1,767.5 metric horsepower (1,743.3 ihp) for an average speed of 12.14 knots (22.48 km/h; 13.97 mph). At a speed of 11 knots (20 km/h; 13 mph), she could steam for 850 nautical miles (1,570 km; 980 mi). On speed trials, Lussin reached just 12.95 knots (23.98 km/h; 14.90 mph) from 1,765.5 metric horsepower (1,741.3 ihp), less than half the power Waldvogel had stated was necessary to reach the design speed. Speed under sail was 12 knots (22 km/h; 14 mph). The engine rooms were poorly ventilated, and after two hours of operation they would be so overheated that the crew had to cool the machinery with water.

The ship was armed with two 15-centimeter (5.9 in) 21-caliber (cal.) guns in single mounts and one 66 mm (2.6 in)/18 landing gun. Five 47 mm (1.9 in) quick-firing guns were added in 1887. She was also armed with one 35 cm (14 in) torpedo tubes submerged in the bow. The ship was protected by an armored deck that was 19 mm (0.75 in) thick.

== Service history ==
=== Construction – 1895 ===
Lussin, probably early in her career

The keel for Lussin was laid down at the Stabilimento Tecnico Triestino shipyard at San Rocco in September 1882. She was scheduled to be launched on 13 September 1883, but delays in the completion of her hull pushed her launching to 22 December. Completion of the ship was delayed further by a strike of the workers at the STT shipyard; this was the first time a strike had delayed the construction of a vessel for the Austro-Hungarian Navy. After her engines and boilers were installed, she was towed to Pola on 12 July 1884 by the paddle steamer Triton. In early October, she began sea trials, and on 21 February 1885, she completed her speed tests. She was commissioned for service the following day, and from 27 March to 30 April embarked on a cruise in the southern Adriatic Sea before operating with the main Austro-Hungarian ironclad squadron until it was disbanded for the year on 17 July.

The ship took part in an international naval demonstration in mid-1886 aimed at preventing a war between Greece and the Ottoman Empire. Lussin joined the ironclad Kaiser Max, six torpedo boats, and several wooden vessels for the operation. After Greece refused to demobilize, the international fleet blockaded several Greek ports; Lussin and the rest of the Austro-Hungarian squadron blockaded Volos in May, and by June, the Greek government had conceded; Lussin's period of service in Greek waters lasted from 7 May to 19 June. By 23 June, she had returned to Pola, where she was decommissioned the next day. She was reactivated for service with the training squadron from 8 May to 6 June 1887, but she spent the following year in reserve. Too slow to perform the duties of a fleet scout or a torpedo-boat flotilla leader, Lussin was removed from frontline service in 1890. Lussin was reclassified as a training ship for engine-room personnel in 1889, and for boiler-room personnel the next year.

The ship continued to take part in the annual fleet maneuvers, including serving with the summer training squadron from 10 May to 29 June 1890. She also participated in the exercises for 1891. The ship conducted a new round of trials in 1892; on 22 August she made 12.14 knots (22.48 km/h; 13.97 mph) from 981 ihp (995 PS). On 2 September, she towed the brigs Camäleon and Arthemisia from Pola to Šibenik, and on 19–20 September towed the brig Bravo from Pola to Šibenik. In 1893, Lussin continued in service as a training ship and she was also assigned to the Torpedo-boat Division. On 7 November, she collided with the torpedo boat Tb 22 in the Hvar Channel. From 1 May to 15 August 1894, the ship served with the training squadron, with the rest of that year and 1895 filled with her routine training duties. On 18 February 1895, the ship ran aground on the northern end of the island of Koločep, and had to be towed free by the cruiser Sebenico on the 24th.

=== 1896–1928 ===
Lussin on 25 January 1917 in Pola

In 1896, the ship received new boilers. She returned to her previous duty as a training ship for engine and boiler room crews the following year, which lasted through most of 1898. On 1 October 1898, she became a mother ship for torpedo boats, which lasted until 30 March 1899. The year 1900 was spent in reserve, and she was reactivated on 23 February 1901 for training duties, which lasted until 10 May. Another stint in the reserve lasted until 1 January 1903, when she was reactivated for service as a station ship in Teodo. She served in this capacity until 27 November 1909; three days later, she was decommissioned. On 30 December, the Marinesektion instructed the Marinetechnisches Komitee (MTK – Naval Technical Committee) to examine how Lussin should be modified so it could be rebuilt to replace the old paddle steamer Fantasie as an admiralty yacht. The MTK determined that the ship should receive new diesel engines, and on 5 April 1910, work began on dismantling her old propulsion system. Her old coal-burning steam engines were replaced with a pair of MAN diesel engines rated at 1,800 brake horsepower (1,300 kW), which produced a speed of 14 knots (26 km/h; 16 mph). The reconstruction work ended in 1913 and she was recommissioned in her new role.

After the outbreak of World War I, Lussin was converted once again, in 1916, as a barracks ship for German U-boat crews based in Pola. After Austria-Hungary's defeat, the ship was surrendered to Italy as a war prize in 1920, who renamed her Sorrento. In Italian service, she was rearmed with four 7.6 cm (3 in) 40-cal. anti-aircraft guns. In her new configuration, she displaced 989 t (973 long tons; 1,090 short tons) normally and 1,052 t (1,035 long tons; 1,160 short tons) fully loaded, and she was able to reach 14.7 knots (27.2 km/h; 16.9 mph) from 3,255 bhp (2,427 kW). She was recommissioned on 11 September 1924 with a crew of 3 officers and 42 men as a depot ship for MAS motor torpedo boats. Sorrento was stricken from the naval register in 1928 and sold for scrap.
