= Friedrich von Pöck =

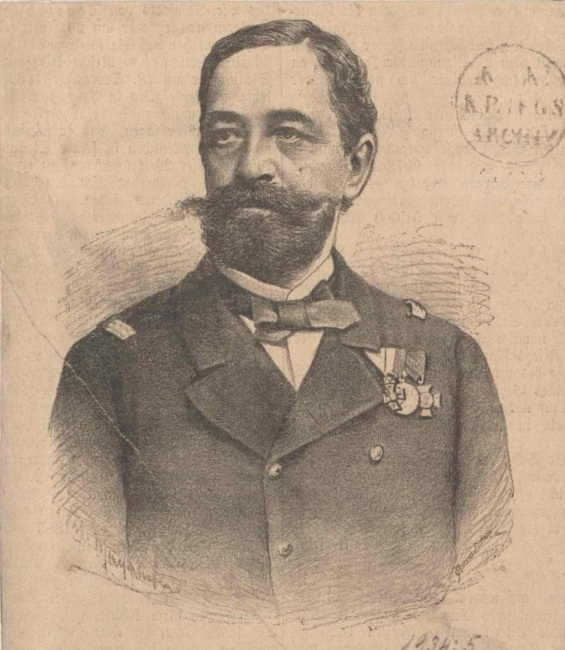
- Born: 19 August 1825; Szobotist, Komitat Neutra, Austrian Empire (now Sobotište in Slovakia)
- Died: 25 September 1884 (aged 59); Feldhof, Austria-Hungary (modern Austria)
- Military career
- Allegiance: Austrian Empire; Austria-Hungary
- Branch: Austro-Hungarian Navy
- Service years: 1843–1883
- Rank: Admiral
- Conflicts: Second Schleswig War; Austro-Prussian War

Friedrich von Pöck (19 August 1825 – 25 September 1884) was an Austro-Hungarian admiral and commander of the Austro-Hungarian Navy. In this role, he held the positions as Marinekommandant and Chief of the Marinesektion from 1871 to his retirement in 1883. He had previously commanded the ship of the line Kaiser during the Second Schleswig War in 1864, though he saw no action. During the Austro-Prussian War, he served as the adjutant to Archduke Albrecht during his campaign to defend Venice from the Italian army. He replaced Wilhelm von Tegetthoff, the popular victor of the Battle of Lissa, who died in 1871. Unlike his predecessor, Pöck was unable to leverage his uneventful naval career to secure funding from the frequently hostile Austro-Hungarian parliament, resulting in more than a decade of stagnation for the fleet. Nevertheless, he did introduce the use of torpedo-armed vessels and began developing tactics to use them. He also sent cruising vessels on numerous voyages abroad, which helped to show the flag overseas. In late 1883, he suffered a nervous breakdown and was forced to retire, ceding his position to Maximilian Daublebsky von Sterneck in November. Pöck died ten months later, on 25 September 1884.

== Early life and naval career ==
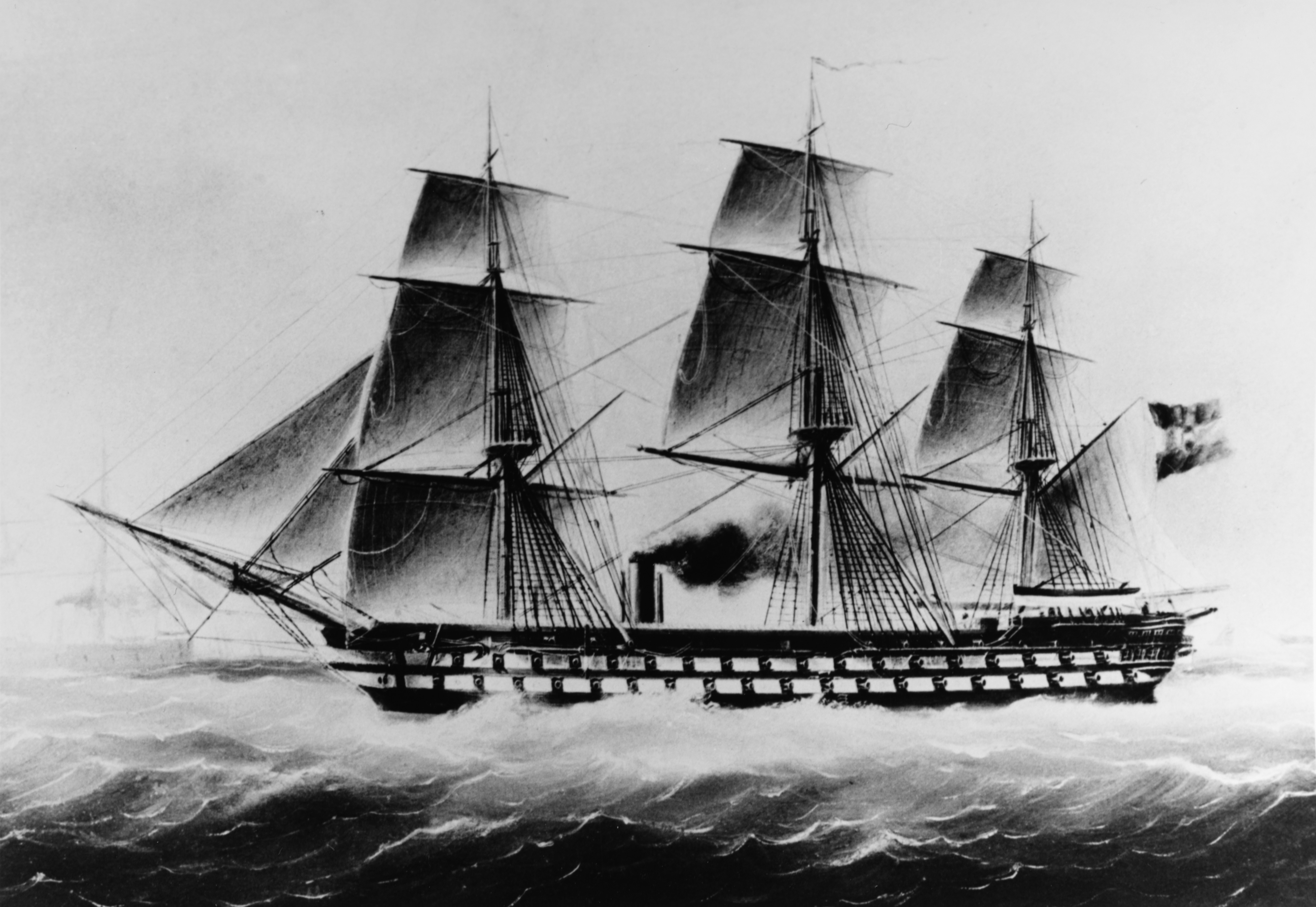
Kaiser, which Pöck commanded during the Second Schleswig War

Friedrich von Pöck was born on 19 August 1825 in Szobotist, Komitat Neutra, in the Kingdom of Hungary, then part of the Austrian Empire. He was the son of the Austrian army officer Colonel Freiherr von Pöck and his wife, Marie Freifrau Horeczky von Kraszna-Horka und Koricsan. Pöck was educated at the old Austrian naval academy in Venice, graduating in 1843. After beginning his service in the fleet, he became a protege of Admiral Bernhard von Wüllerstorf after serving as his second in command during their circumnavigation of the globe aboard the steam frigate SMS Novara in the late 1850s.

During the Second Schleswig War in 1864, he commanded the ship of the line Kaiser on a deployment to the North Sea, again under Wüllerstorf. He did not see action, as an advance squadron commanded by Captain Wilhelm von Tegetthoff had broken the Danish blockade of the northern German ports at the Battle of Heligoland. In 1865, Kaiser Franz Joseph abolished the Austrian naval ministry, placed the navy under the war ministry as the Marinesektion (Naval Section), and created the position of Marine Truppen-und Flotteninspektor (Naval Troop and Fleet Inspector) Archduke Leopold. Pöck, then holding the rank of captain, became Leopold's adjutant, along with his primary protege. Tegethoff had been promoted to the rank of rear admiral after the battle of Heligoland, ahead of several other captains, including Pöck. Accordingly, Leopold promoted Pöck to the same rank, but back-dated the promotion to before Tegetthoff's, to restore Pöck's seniority.

During the Seven Weeks' War against Prussia and Italy, Tegetthoff was placed in command of the battle fleet; Leopold was too preoccupied with command of an army corps that was to engage the Prussian Army to advocate for Pöck's command of the fleet. Pöck was instead assigned as the naval liaison for Archduke Albrecht in Venetia. Pöck replaced Tegetthoff as the fleet commander after the latter became the Navy chief, a position Pöck held until January 1870. He was then promoted to the second in command of the Navy, though he succeeded Tegetthoff after his untimely death in April 1871. This role filled two positions, with Pöck serving as the Marinekommandant and the Chief of the Marinesektion. Rear Admiral Georg von Millosicz in turn took Pöck's previous position as second in command.

== Marinekommandant ==
Pöck faced chronic budgetary problems, owing in large part due to obstructionism from Hungarians and liberal Germans in parliament, the former viewing naval matters as an Austrian concern, and the latter opposed to naval expansion in light of the reduced threat from Italy in the 1870s. Additionally, since he was not involved in Tegetthoff's victory at the Battle of Lissa in 1866, he lacked the personal prestige to command the respect of parliament. As a result, he had great difficulty securing the funding for new ironclad warships during his tenure. He finally won approval for a new ship, SMS Tegetthoff, in 1875 but he could not convince parliament to allocate funds for a sister ship he had planned to name Erzherzog Karl. Confronted with parliamentary unwillingness to strengthen the fleet further, Pöck resorted to subterfuge to acquire the funds he needed. In 1875, he asked for a budget increase to "rebuild" the three Kaiser Max-class ironclads. In fact, Pöck sold the old vessels for scrap, reusing only the machinery, armor plate, and other fittings in three new ships, which were given the same names to obscure Pöck's sleight of hand.

Throughout this period, the annual budget for the fleet continued to fall, from 9.5 million florins in 1878 to 8 million in 1880. Pöck continued to push for another new ironclad, but by 1880 his efforts were only symbolic: in his proposed budget estimates for the year, he included the ship, but did not actually allocate any funds for it. Unable to increase the strength of the ironclad fleet, Pöck turned to less expensive means to defend Austria-Hungary's coastline, including development of naval mines and self-propelled torpedoes. He ordered the first torpedo boat, Torpedoboot I, from Britain in 1875, followed by five more from Britain and four more from domestic shipyards thereafter. In the late 1870s and early 1880s, he also ordered the four torpedo cruisers Zara, Spalato, Sebenico, and Lussin.

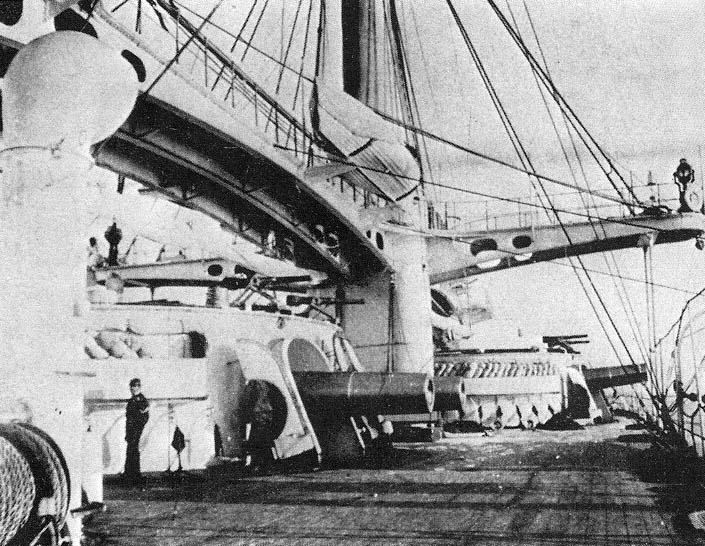
The two Duilio-class ships carried four massive 17.7 in (450 mm) guns, which caused a naval scare Pöck unsuccessfully tried to leverage for a stronger fleet

The commissioning of the very powerful Italian Duilio-class ironclads in 1880 caused a naval scare in Austria-Hungary, prompting Kaiser Franz Josef I ordered a joint army-navy commission to examine the problem. Pöck argued that the fleet would have to seek parity with the Italian fleet, which planned to build a fleet of sixteen battleships by 1888. Archduke Albrecht, then the inspector general of the army, argued that parity was impossible, and that the navy would have to focus instead on defensive weapons and tactics. In response, Pöck formulated a new fleet plan in 1881 that aimed simply to maintain the number of ironclads in service, replacing only the oldest four by 1888. Two would be replaced by new ships, and the other two would be "rebuilt" like the Kaiser Maxes a decade earlier. The plan was accepted by parliament, but they delayed its completion to 1892, which would reduce the annual expenditure from 2.15 million florins to 1.7 million.

The heaviest blow to Pöck's plans came in 1882, with the signing of the Triple Alliance with Germany and Italy, which removed the threat of a hostile Italian fleet across the Adriatic. Thereafter, funding for the new warships authorized under the 1881 program was consistently trimmed in the annual budgets. This delayed construction of a replacement for the decrepit ironclad Salamander and the "reconstruction" of Habsburg, which ultimately never took place.

To combat reduced morale in the face of quantitative stagnation with the ironclad fleet, Pöck increased the number of ships sent abroad. Unarmored cruising ships were sent to ports around the world to represent Austria-Hungary throughout the 1870s and 1880s. He also sent ships to conduct scientific explorations in the Arctic Ocean in 1872–1874 and 1882–1883. These cruises logged more time abroad for Austro-Hungarian warships than the rest of the history of the navy combined. He also began experimenting with the new torpedo boats and developing tactics to use them in battle. In September 1882, Pöck held major maneuvers to test methods to get the small craft close enough to attack larger, more powerful ironclads. Franz Josef, impressed by the exercises, promoted Pöck to full admiral.

Exhausted from more than a decade of service as the Marinekommandant and struggling with parliament, Pöck suffered a nervous breakdown in early November 1883. He was ordered to resign his commission, and his position was filled by Admiral Maximilian Daublebsky von Sterneck on 13 November. Pöck died ten months later, on 25 September 1884 in Feldhof near Graz. Pöck's efforts eventually did bear fruit, though he did not live long enough to see it. "Ersatz Salamander" (Replacement Salamander) was eventually laid down in January 1884 and commissioned in September 1889 as Kronprinz Erzherzog Rudolf. And Sterneck used Pöck's budgetary subterfuge tactic to acquire another new ironclad, Kronprinzessin Erzherzogin Stephanie, by appropriating funds Pöck had secured to rebuild Erzherzog Ferdinand Max to construct the new vessel.

== Notes ==
Military offices
Preceded by Wilhelm von Tegetthoff	Commander-in-Chief of the Austro-Hungarian Naval Fleet; 1871-1883	Succeeded by Maximilian Daublebsky von Sterneck
