= Sebenico (disambiguation) =

Sebenico is the Italian name for the city of Šibenik, Croatia.

Sebenico may also refer to:

- SMS Sebenico, an Austro-Hungarian cruiser in service 1880 to 1920
- Italian destroyer Sebenico, the 1941–1943 name of the Yugoslav ship Beograd (1937–1945)
