= Spalato (disambiguation) =

Spalato is the Italian name for the city of Split, Croatia.

Spalato may also refer to:

- Province of Spalato, a former Italian province encompassing Split
- Spalato railway, a part of the former narrow-gauge railways in Bosnia and Herzegovina
- SMS Spalato, a torpedo cruiser of the Austro-Hungarian Navy
- Italian destroyer Spalato, a previous name for the Yugoslav destroyer Split
