= Zara-class cruiser (1879) =

Torpedo cruiser class of the Austro-Hungarian Navy

- SMS Zara early in her career

Class overview
- Builders: Pola Naval Arsenal; Stabilimento Tecnico Triestino
- Operators: Austro-Hungarian Navy
- Preceded by: None
- Succeeded by: SMS Lussin
- Built: 1878–1882
- In commission: 1881–1918
- Completed: 3
- Scrapped: 3

General characteristics (Note: Figures are for Zara and Spalato)
- Type: Torpedo cruiser
- Displacement: 833 long tons (846 t)
- Length: 62.71 m (205 ft 9 in)
- Beam: 8.22 m (27 ft 0 in)
- Draft: 4.1 m (13 ft 5 in)
- Installed power: 5 × fire-tube boilers; 1,370 PS (1,350 ihp)
- Propulsion: 2 × compound steam engines; 2 × screws
- Speed: 12.63 kn (23.39 km/h; 14.53 mph)
- Crew: 13 officers; 135 enlisted men
- Armament: 4 x 87 mm (3.4 in) L/24 guns; 1 x 66 mm (2.6 in) L/15 gun; 2 x 25 mm (0.98 in) Nordenfelt guns; 4 x torpedo tubes
- Armor: Deck: 19 mm (0.75 in)

The Zara class was a class of three torpedo cruisers built for the Austro-Hungarian Navy in the late 1870s and early 1880s; they were the first large torpedo-armed warships built by Austria-Hungary. The class comprised three ships, Zara, Spalato, and Sebenico; the last vessel was built to a slightly different design, and is sometimes not counted as a member of the class. The design was prepared by Josef von Romako, the Chief Constructor of the Austro-Hungarian Navy, after a lengthy design process throughout the 1870s. The first two ships were armed with deck-mounted torpedo tubes, while Sebenico received an experimental tube in her bow, submerged below the waterline.

Despite the lengthy design process, the ships proved to be failures in service, primarily as a result of their low speed. Intended to reach a speed of at least 15 knots (28 km/h; 17 mph), none of the vessels were able to steam that fast. The changes made to Sebenico during construction were meant to address the problem, but she was unable to reach her design speed either. As a result, they saw very little active service, spending much of their careers in reserve. By the 1890s, they were reactivated for training ship duties, and in 1897 Sebenico took part in an international naval demonstration off Crete, where she sank a Greek blockade runner. Training ship duties continued through the early 1910s. During World War I, all three vessels were used as guard ships, but none saw action. After the war, they were seized as war prizes by the Allies and awarded to Italy in 1920; all were broken up immediately thereafter.

== Design ==
Through the 1870s, the Marinekommandant (Navy Commander) of the Austro-Hungarian Navy, Friedrich von Pöck, could not secure sufficient funding for construction of ironclad warships. Unable to increase the strength of the ironclad fleet, Pöck turned to less expensive means to defend Austria-Hungary's coastline, including development of naval mines and self-propelled torpedoes. In March 1872, the Torpedoversuchs-Kommission (Torpedo Testing Commission) recommended to Pöck that a new warship should be built to use the Whitehead torpedo that had been developed in Austria-Hungary in the 1860s. Pöck decided to await a report from then-Fregattenkapitän (Frigate Captain) Hermann von Spaun, the naval attache to Britain, who was observing British developments, including the construction of the torpedo gunboat HMS Vesuvius. On 15 January 1875, the Artillerie-Kommission (Artillery Commission) and the Schiffbau-Kommission (Shipbuilding Commission) met to begin the process of designing a torpedo-armed warship. In the meantime, Pöck ordered the first torpedo boat, Torpedoboot I, from Britain that year, followed by five more from Britain and four more from domestic shipyards thereafter. The commissions were primarily concerned with several fundamental concerns, including whether the ship should be armored or not, whether it would only use the Whitehead torpedoes or it would also carry towed torpedoes, the propulsion system and whether it would include a sailing rig or not, and the speed the ship should be capable of reaching.

The Schiffbau-Kommission recommended building a ship with heavy armor to protect it from enemy fire, one or two 10-centimeter (3.9 in) guns in the bow, deck-mounted launchers for the Whitehead torpedoes, and towed torpedoes to be used defensively against ramming. The launchers would be supplied with six torpedoes each. The ship would be capable of a speed of at least 15 knots (28 km/h; 17 mph) from a twin-screw propulsion system, and it would not be equipped with a sailing rig. They also created an alternate proposal for a smaller, unarmored ship with just two to four light guns, in the event that their preferred vessel could not reach the desired speed. The Artillerie-Kommission proposed a smaller design with sufficient armor and a high speed but no guns. They argued that an attempt to build what they described as a "universal battle-ship" (i.e., the Schiffbau-Kommission's first proposal) was ill-advised, since torpedoes were still in the developmental phase and a vessel of that type would be expensive and risky, considering the limited budgets of the time. The Torpedoversuchs-Kommission recommended a vessel with submerged torpedo tubes, a ram bow, deck and waterline belt armor, and two heavy gun turrets if it were possible to install them without compromising the ability of the ship to use its torpedoes effectively. Alternatively, if submerged tubes could not be made to work on the broadside, the ship should include two deck-mounted launchers with at least five torpedoes apiece, four heavy guns, and a speed sufficient just to keep pace with the ironclads of the main fleet.

On 26 March, Pöck held a meeting to discuss the proposals. A suggestion was made to await developments in torpedo technology and to incorporate the weapons into the next ironclad that they could secure funding from Parliament to build. Josef von Romako, the Chief Constructor of the Austro-Hungarian Navy, pointed out that such a vessel would have to be very large to allow it to reach high enough speeds for it to be able to use torpedoes effectively. The meeting concluded with the consensus that the new vessel should be built as a purely torpedo-armed vessel, with no armor and no heavy guns. In the meantime, Spaun made his report on British naval activities, which included the completion of Vesuvius and the introduction of twin-screw propulsion. He also reported on the construction and sea trials of the British-built torpedo-aviso SMS Zieten for the Imperial German Navy. Zieten proved to be fast and maneuverable, qualities that made her well-suited to training and development of the German torpedo warfare arm. In January 1877, Pöck decided that the new vessel should incorporate the twin-screw, 15-knot requirement from the Schiffbau-Kommission proposal. On 30 January, Shipbuilding Engineer Andressen began working on the projet, which at that time included a pair of 24 cm (9.4 in) guns in an armored casemate. Pöck pointed out that the ship should not include heavy guns, and that two 12 cm (4.7 in) guns without armor would be sufficient; the only armor the ship was to have was a curved protective deck. Andressen prepared three more designs, as seen in the table below.

Design	Displacement	Armament	Propulsion	Length	Beam	Draft
I	3,200 long tons (3,300 t)	2 × 24 cm guns 2 × machine guns 4 × torpedo tubes	8 × boilers 2 screws 16 knots (30 km/h; 18 mph); 3,600 PS (2,600 kW)	79 m (259 ft 2 in)	12.02 m (39 ft 5 in)	5.69 m (18 ft 8 in)
II	1,230 long tons (1,250 t)	2 × 24 cm guns 4 × torpedo tubes	2 screws 14 to 15 knots (26 to 28 km/h; 16 to 17 mph); 2,140 PS (1,570 kW)	60 m (196 ft 10 in)	9 m (29 ft 6 in)	4.3 m (14 ft 1 in)
III	8,846 long tons (8,988 t)	4 × 100-ton guns 4 × torpedo tubes	2 screws 13 knots (24 km/h; 15 mph); 6,600 PS (4,900 kW)	84 m (275 ft 7 in)	—	—
IV	736.6 long tons (748.4 t)	2 × 12 cm guns 4 × torpedo tubes	4 × boilers 2 screws 15 knots (28 km/h; 17 mph); 1,380 PS (1,010 kW)	52.2 m (171 ft 3 in)	8.5 m (27 ft 11 in)	5.46 m (17 ft 11 in)

Pöck rejected all of Andressen's proposals, since none of them incorporated the characteristics specified in the March 1875 meeting. Romako took over the design process in 1878, and prepared the design for Zara, construction of which began on 1 August that year. Romako based his design on the German Zieten, though the German vessel was significantly faster than the Zara class, in part because Zieten had a longer, finer hull and was more lightly built. In addition, the engines and boilers used in Zara and her sister ships could not tolerate as high a pressure as those in Zieten, and their boilers consumed coal excessively.

=== Characteristics ===
The first two ships of the Zara class—Zara and Spalato—were 62.71 meters (205 ft 9 in) long overall and 55 m (180 ft) long between perpendiculars. They had a beam of 8.22 m (27 ft 0 in) and a draft of 4.1 m (13 ft 5 in). Sebenico was built to a slightly larger design in an attempt to rectify the earlier vessels' inability to meet the designed speed. She was 64.91 m (213 ft 0 in) overall and 57.2 m (188 ft) between perpendiculars, with a beam of 8.24 m (27 ft 0 in) and a draft of 4.2 m (13 ft 9 in). Zara and Spalato displaced 833 long tons (846 t), while Sebenico was slightly heavier, at 882.6 long tons (896.8 t). Each ship had a crew of 13 officers and 135 enlisted men.

The ships' propulsion system consisted of a pair of two-cylinder vertical compound steam engines, with steam provided by five coal-fired, cylindrical fire-tube boilers. The boilers were ducted into a single funnel located amidships. The engines drove a pair of bronze screws that were 2.74 m (9 ft 0 in) in diameter. On trials, Zara reached a speed of 14.29 knots (26.47 km/h; 16.44 mph) from 1,800 metric horsepower (1,800 ihp), by far the fastest member of the class, though still below her design speed. Spalato reached a speed of 12.63 knots (23.39 km/h; 14.53 mph) from 1,370 PS (1,350 ihp), while Sebenico made 12.81 knots (23.72 km/h; 14.74 mph) from 1,598 PS (1,576 ihp). To supplement their steam engines, each vessel had an auxiliary sailing barquentine rig with two masts and a sail area of 275.6 m^{2} (2,967 sq ft).

The ships' gun armament consisted of four 9-centimeter (3.5 in) 24-caliber (cal.) guns in single mounts, along with one 7 cm (2.8 in) 15-cal. gun and two 25 mm (0.98 in) Nordenfelt guns. Zara and Spalato were also armed with four torpedo tubes. The torpedo tubes were located singly, two in the bow and at either beam in deck-mounted launchers. Sebenico instead had a single bow-mounted torpedo tube in her bow, submerged below the waterline. All three Zara-class ships were protected with a thin 19 mm (0.75 in) armored deck.

=== Modifications ===
The ships were modified extensively in an attempt to rectify their machinery problems. All three ships had their propeller shafts lengthened, and their original bronze screws were replaced with larger steel propellers, though this did not improve performance. Sebenico received the most radical alteration; her stern was lengthened slightly to allow for finer hull lines, which would improve her hydrodynamic shape, though this too failed to provide a significantly higher speed. As a result of her different hull, Sebenico is sometimes not included in the Zara class. Between 1898 and 1901, all three ships were re-boilered.

All three ships received several 47 mm (1.9 in) guns in the mid-1880s; these included a Hotchkiss revolver cannon on their bows and four single-barrel quick-firing guns. In 1897, Spalato received a wide variety of guns so she could be used with the artillery training school. These included one 12 cm (4.7 in) 40-cal. gun, two 15 cm (5.9 in) 26-cal. guns, one 47 mm 44-cal. gun, and two 37 mm (1.5 in) guns; two of the 9 cm guns were removed to make room. By 1901, many of these guns had been removed, leaving just two 12 cm guns, one 6.6 cm (2.6 in) gun, two 47 mm 44-cal. guns, and one 37 mm gun. Sebenico was similarly modified in 1903; in addition to two 12 cm guns, she acquired one 6.6 cm gun, four 47 mm 33-cal. guns, four 47 mm 44-cal. guns, two 37 mm 23-cal. guns, two 37 mm autocannon, and two 8 mm (0.31 in) machine guns. At some point before 1914, she also received a 10 cm (3.9 in) gun. In 1917, Zara's armament consisted of two 6.6 cm guns, four 47 mm 33-cal. guns and four 47 mm 44-cal. guns, along with her two bow torpedo tubes.

== Ships ==
Name	Builder	Laid down	Launched	Completed
Zara	Pola Naval Arsenal, Pola	1 August 1878	13 November 1879	13 June 1881
Spalato	Stabilimento Tecnico Triestino, Trieste	September 1878	30 August 1879	September 1881
Sebenico	Pola Naval Arsenal	29 November 1880	28 February 1882	December 1882

== Service history ==
Spalato in the 1880s or early 1890s

Owing to their poor performance and slow speed, the Zara-class cruisers did not see significant service with the fleet. They were too slow to be used as fleet scouts or flotilla leaders, and their gun armament was too weak for them to be able to protect torpedo boats from torpedo-boat destroyers. As a result, they spent most of the 1880s and 1890s laid up, being reactivated briefly for training exercises. Sebenico returned to active service in 1893, alternating between sea duty with the training squadron and harbor service as a training ship for engine-room personnel. In 1897, Spalato became assigned to the artillery school, while Zara was recommissioned for use in the torpedo school. That year, Sebenico took part in the only significant period of fleet service, when she was sent to the island of Crete to participate in an international naval demonstration during Greco-Turkish War. During the blockade, Sebenico stopped and sank a Greek vessel trying to break the blockade. Sebenico served in a variety of auxiliary roles over the following five years, before joining Spalato in the artillery school in 1903; the three ships served in their training roles until the outbreak of World War I in July 1914, at which point they became guard ships.

The ships saw no action during the war, owing in large part to the nature of the Adriatic campaign. The Austro-Hungarian Navy and its primary opponent, the Italian Navy, both adopted cautious strategies, since neither wanted to risk its fleet in the narrow waters of the Adriatic Sea, where naval mines and fast, torpedo-armed craft could operate effectively. Zara was stationed in Cattaro Bay and Sebenico protected the harbor of her namesake city, while Spalato provided local defense outside Pola. Zara was transferred from Cattaro Bay to Pola in June 1917, but while en route, suffered a serious explosion that caused significant damage to her bow. A contemporary investigation determined that it was the result of badly deteriorated chemicals in her torpedo warheads, though the naval historian René Greger reports that a mine was actually to blame. After repairs were effected, she joined the harbor defense at Pola. Sebenico was withdrawn from guard duties in 1918 and assigned to the torpedo school. All three ships were seized as war prizes by the victorious Allied powers after the war in 1918, and all three were awarded to Italy in 1920. Having no use for the vessels, the Italians immediately sold all three to ship breakers.
