= Atzgersdorf =

Coordinates: 48°08′46″N 16°17′47″E

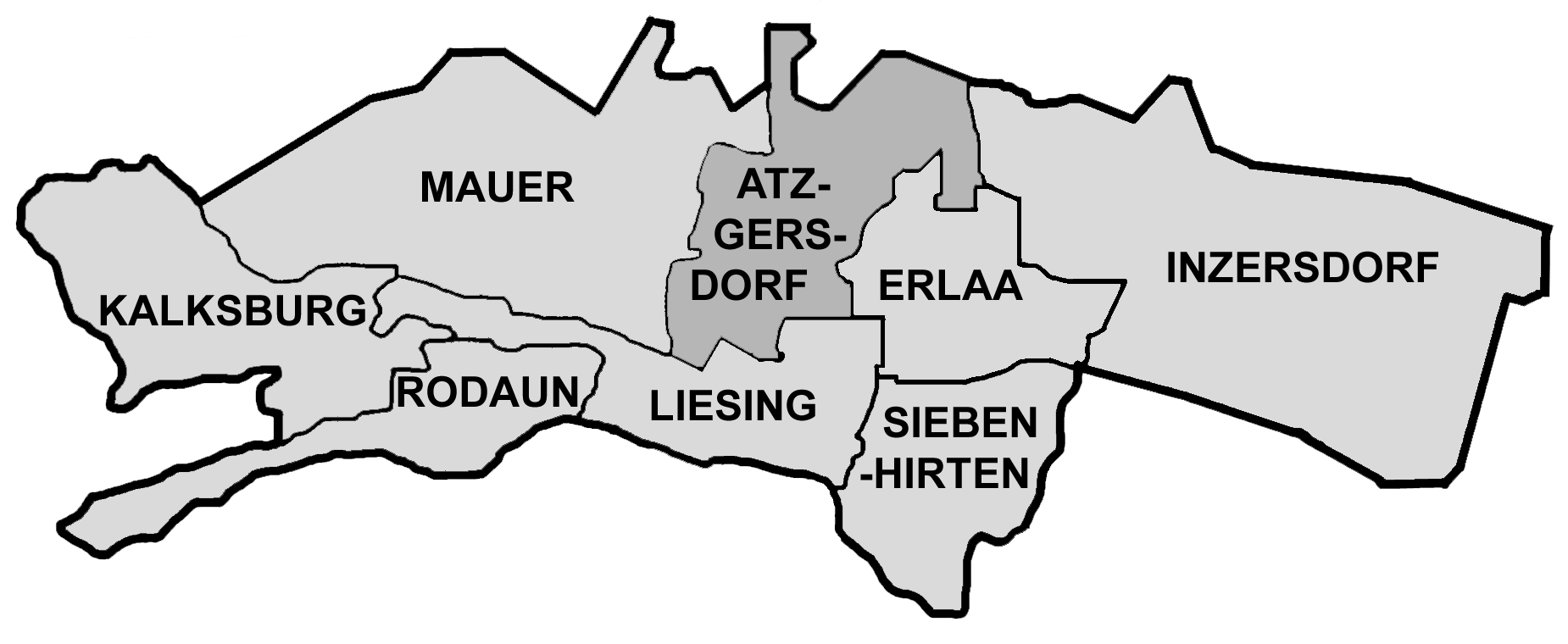
Atzgersdorf
Emblem	Map
Wappen von Atzgersdorf

Atzgersdorf (German pronunciation: [ˈat͡sɡɐsˌdɔʁf]; Central Bavarian: Atzgasduaf) is a former municipality in Lower Austria that is now a part of the 23rd Viennese district Liesing. A small part of the former municipality today is part of the 12th Viennese district Meidling.

Today, the cadastral commune Atzgersdorf has an area of 411,42 hectares. The part that belongs to Meidling has an area of 35 hectares.

== Geography ==
The east of Atzgersdorf is counted among the geological era of Holocene. The west is built on ground originating in the Pannonium, which is a subdivision of the Miocene.

== People ==
- Ludwig von Bertalanffy (1901–1972), biologist
- Hanns Hörbiger (1860–1931), engineer
- Kurt Peters (1897–1978), chemist
- Josef von Romako (1828–1882), naval officer
- Anton Romako (1832–1889), painter
- Karl Skraup (1898–1958), actor
- Leopold Vogl (born 1910), football player
