= Leopold Vogl =

Austrian footballer

Personal information
- Date of birth: 16 September 1910
- Place of birth: Atzgersdorf, Vienna, Austria
- Date of death: 16 December 1991 (aged 81)
- Place of death: Vienna, Austria
- Position: Forward

Senior career*
Years	Team	Apps	(Gls)
- Forward Atzgersdorf
- Wacker Wien
- Admira Wien
- Wiener AC

International career
1935	Austria	2	(2)

Managerial career
- 1956–1957: Austria Wien
- 1964: Austria Wien
- * Club domestic league appearances and goals

Leopold Vogl, or Vogel, (16 September 1910 – 16 December 1991) was an Austrian footballer and manager who played for a number of clubs in Austria. He featured twice for the Austria national football team in 1935, scoring two goals.

== Career statistics ==
=== International ===
Appearances and goals by national team and year
National team	Year	Apps	Goals
Austria	1935	2	2
Total		2	2

=== International goals ===
Scores and results list Austria's goal tally first.

No	Date	Venue	Opponent	Score	Result	Competition
1.	12 May 1935	Praterstadion, Vienna, Austria	Poland	2–0	5–2	Friendly
2.	12 May 1935	Praterstadion, Vienna, Austria	Poland	5–2	5–2	Friendly
