= Maximilian Daublebsky von Sterneck =

Austrian admiral (1829–1897)

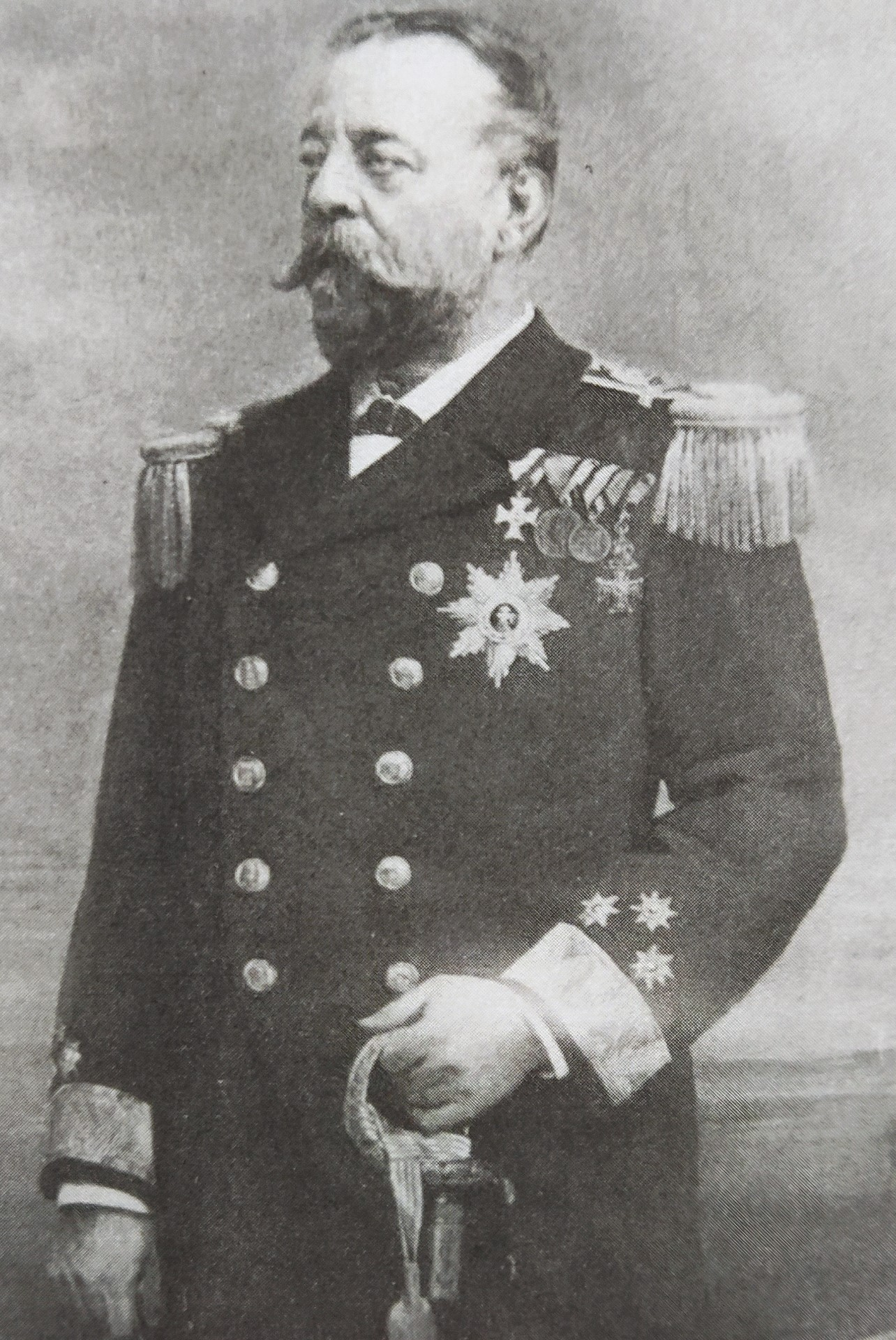
Daublebsky von Sterneck in 1888

Maximilian Daublebsky Freiherr von Sterneck zu Ehrenstein (14 February 1829 – 5 December 1897) was an Austrian admiral who served as the chief administrator of the Austro-Hungarian Navy from 1883 until his death.

== Biography ==
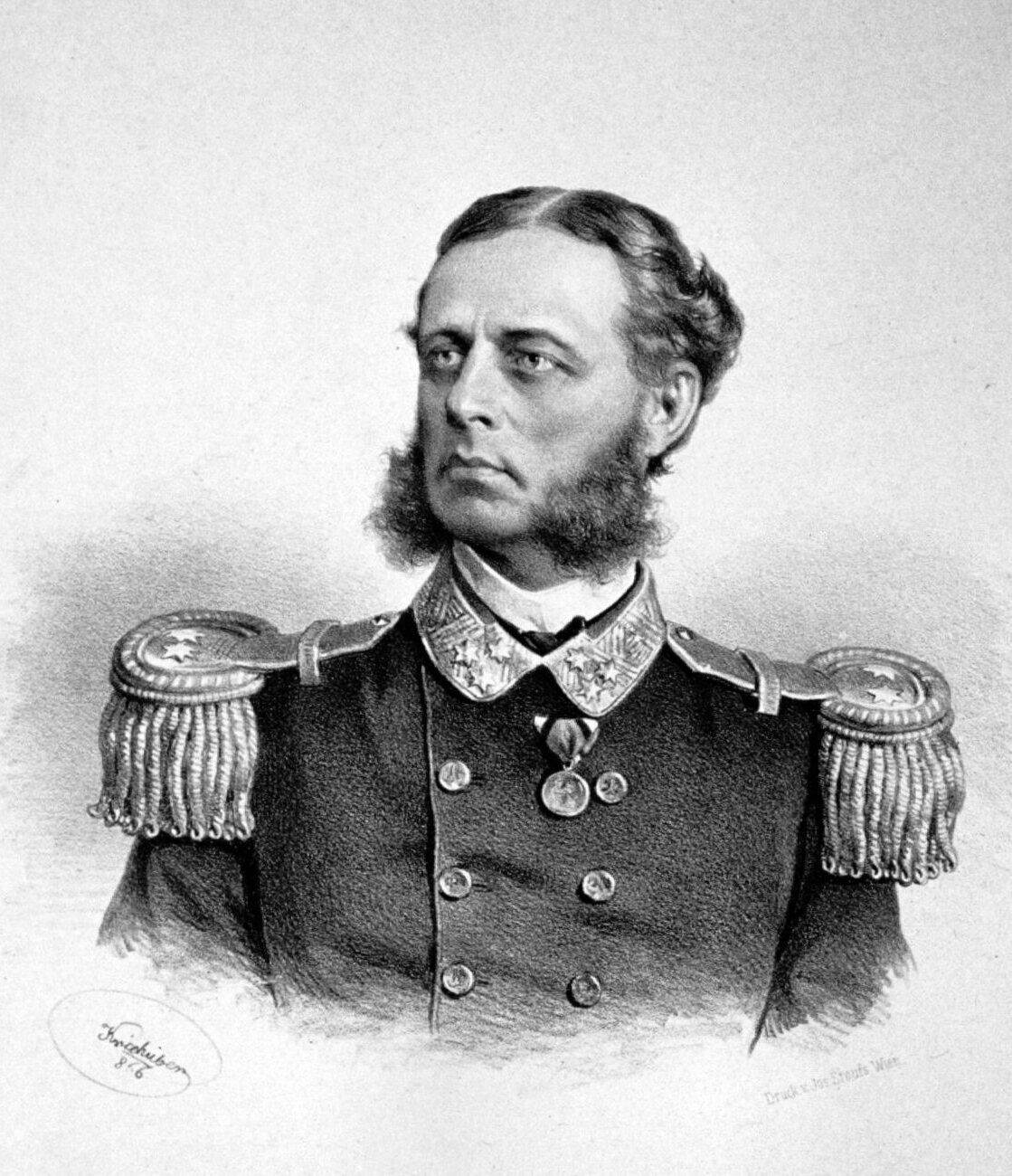
Maximilian Daublebsky von Sterneck, Lithography by Josef Kriehuber, 1866

He was born at Klagenfurt, into a family from Bohemia where they long held the office of mayor of Budweis. In 1620 they were ennobled in Austria with the addition of the German name von Sterneck. Jacob Daublebsky von Sterneck was further created Freiherr (Baron) von Sterneck zu Ehrenstein in 1792. His son Joseph settled in Carinthia and purchased the castle of Krastowitz in Klagenfurt, where his son Maximilian was born in 1829. Maximilian Daublebsky von Sterneck was educated to be an officer in the then Austrian Navy, attaining the rank of lieutenant commander (Korvettenkapitän) in 1859. He was promoted to commander (Fregattenkapitän) in 1864 and later was appointed to command the flagship Erzherzog Ferdinand Max by rear-admiral (Konteradmiral) Wilhelm von Tegetthoff.

In the Battle of Lissa (20 July 1866), Daublebsky von Sterneck succeeded in by ramming the Italian flagship Re d'Italia, which capsized and sank. For his services during the battle, he was awarded the Military Order of Maria Theresa. In an 1880 painting by Anton Romako, Daublebsky is pictured at Tegetthoff's side on the bridge during the ramming attack (Rammstosstaktik).

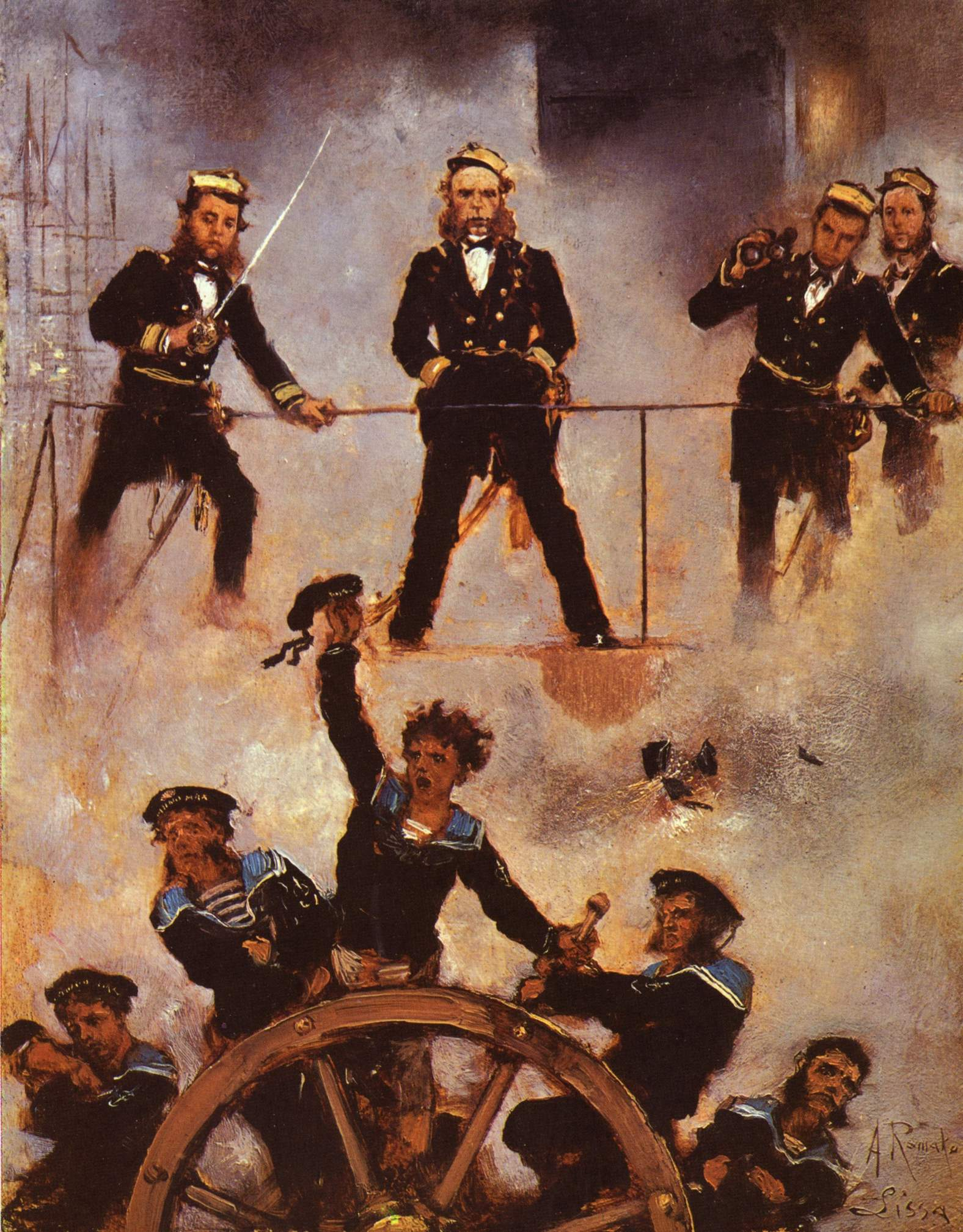
Battle of Lissa, painting by Anton Romako, 1880.

The creation of the Dual Monarchy in 1867 was accompanied by the reorganization of the naval service as the Austro-Hungarian Navy. Daublebsky von Sterneck was appointed port commander at Pola in 1869 with the rank of full captain (Linienschiffskapitän. He was promoted to Kontradmiral in 1872 and took part in the 1872-74 North Polar expedition of Julius von Payer and Karl Weyprecht as commander of the Isbjörn. It was this expedition that discovered Franz Josef Land, named for the Austrian emperor, in 1873.

Daublebsky von Sterneck was named to succeed Friedrich von Pöck as Marinekommandant (Navy Commander) and Chef der Marinesektion (Chief of the Naval Section of the War Ministry) in November 1883 with the rank of Vizeadmiral. His efforts to modernize the Navy were hamstrung by interminable political friction between the Austrian and Hungarian halves of the empire. When Sir Edward J. Reed published the second half of his profile of the Continental navies in Harper's in February 1887, he dismissed the Austro-Hungarian Navy as antiquated and omitted any tabulation of information about the fleet's ships—in sharp contrast to his description of the fleet of Austria-Hungary's principal ally, Germany.

Promoted to full admiral in 1888, Daublebsky von Sterneck persevered in his efforts to modernize the Austro-Hungarian fleet until his death in Vienna in 1897. He initiated the construction - 1891–1898 - of the navy garrison Catholic Church of Our Lady of the Sea (Italian: Madonna del Mare/German: k.u.k. Marinekirche Unserer Lieben Frau vom Meer/Croatian: Gospe od Mora) in Pola's suburb San Policarpo. His body was initially buried at the close Navy Cemetery and later interred in that church, to which Daublebsky von Sterneck had devoted much effort. His heart however was placed in the family crypt in the castle of Krastowitz. Daublebsky von Sterneck was succeeded as head of the navy by Hermann von Spaun.

== Honours ==
He received the following orders and decorations:

- Austrian Empire:
  - Knight of the Military Order of Maria Theresa, 1866
  - Knight of the Imperial Order of Leopold, with War Decoration, 1866; Grand Cross, 1893
  - Knight of the Iron Crown, 1st Class, 1887
  - Military Merit Medal ("Signum Laudis"), with Red Band
- Denmark: Grand Cross of the Dannebrog, 18 August 1890
- (Saxe-Coburg and Gotha) (Duchy of Saxe-Altenburg) (Saxe-Meiningen) Ernestine duchies: Grand Cross of the Saxe-Ernestine House Order
- French Empire: Commander of the Legion of Honour
- Kingdom of Greece: Grand Commander of the Redeemer
- Empire of Japan: Grand Cordon of the Rising Sun
- Mexican Empire: Grand Officer of the Order of Guadalupe
- Principality of Montenegro: Grand Officer of the Order of Prince Danilo I
- Ottoman Empire: Order of Osmanieh, 1st Class
- Kingdom of Prussia: Grand Cross of the Red Eagle
- Spain: Grand Cross of Naval Merit, with White Decoration, 1888
- Sweden-Norway: Commander Grand Cross of the Sword, 1 October 1890
- Grand Duchy of Tuscany: Grand Cross of Civil and Military Merit

== Literature ==
- German Wikipedia entry "Maximilian Daublebsky von Sterneck'
- Sir Edward James Reed, "The Navies of the Continent. II - The Italian, Russian, German, Austrian, and Turkish Navies. Harper's New Monthly Magazine, European Edition, February 1887.

== See also ==
- Austro-Hungarian Navy

Military offices
Preceded by Friedrich von Pöck	Commander-in-Chief of the Austro-Hungarian Naval Fleet; 1883-1897	Succeeded by Hermann von Spaun
