= SMS Sebenico =

Torpedo cruiser of the Austro-Hungarian Navy

- SMS Zara; Sebenico was similar in appearance

History

Austro-Hungarian Empire
- Name: Sebenico
- Namesake: Sebenico (Šibenik)
- Laid down: 20 July 1880
- Launched: 22 February 1882
- Commissioned: December 1882
- Fate: Ceded to Italy and scrapped, 1920

General characteristics
- Class & type: Zara class
- Displacement: 882.6 long tons (896.8 t)
- Length: 64.91 m (213 ft)
- Beam: 8.24 m (27 ft)
- Draft: 4.2 m (14 ft)
- Installed power: 5 × fire-tube boilers; 1,598 PS (1,576 ihp)
- Propulsion: 2 × compound steam engines; 2 × screws
- Speed: 12.81 knots (23.72 km/h; 14.74 mph)
- Range: 13 officers; 135 enlisted men
- Armament: 4 x 9-centimeter (3.5 in) 24-cal. guns; 1 x 7 cm (2.8 in) 15-cal. gun; 2 x 25 mm (0.98 in) Nordenfelt guns; 1 x torpedo tubes
- Armor: Deck: 19 mm (0.75 in)

SMS Sebenico was a torpedo cruiser of the Austro-Hungarian Navy, the third member of the Zara class, though built to a slightly different design to her two half-sister ships in an unsuccessful attempt to improve her speed. She was laid down in July 1880, launched in February 1882, and commissioned in December that year. Too slow to be used in her intended roles as a fleet scout and a flotilla leader, she saw little active service. She took part in an international naval demonstration off Crete in 1897, where she sank a Greek ship trying to break the blockade. Sebenico served as a training ship for the rest of her career, including with the artillery school from 1903 to 1915, and with the torpedo school until the end of World War I in 1918. Ceded to Italy as a war prize in 1920, she was then broken up for scrap.

== Design ==
Sebenico was 64.91 meters (213 ft) long overall, with a beam of 8.24 m (27 ft) and a draft of 4.2 m (13 ft 9 in). She displaced 882.6 long tons (896.8 t). The ship's propulsion system consisted of a pair of two-cylinder vertical compound steam engines, with steam provided by five cylindrical fire-tube boilers. On trials, Sebenico reached a speed of 12.81 knots (23.72 km/h; 14.74 mph) from 1,598 metric horsepower (1,576 ihp). Her crew numbered 13 officers and 135 enlisted men.

The ship's gun armament consisted of four 9-centimeter (3.5 in) 24-caliber (cal.) Breech-loading guns in single mounts, along with one 7 cm (2.8 in) 15-cal. breech-loading gun and two 25 mm (0.98 in) Nordenfelt guns. She was also armed with a single torpedo tube in the bow mounted below the waterline. Sebenico was protected with a thin 19 mm (0.75 in) armored deck.

== Service history ==
The keel for Sebenico was laid down on 20 July 1880. Chief Engineer Josef von Romako, the designer of the ships, decided to slightly lengthen Sebenico in an attempt to improve her speed over her sister ships Zara and Spalato, which had failed to reach their design speed of 15 knots (28 km/h; 17 mph). This would give Sebenico finer hull lines and thus produce a better hydrodynamic shape. On 22 February 1882, she was launched, after which her machinery was installed. Initial sea trials were conducted on 23 and 24 November, followed by additional trials from 9 to 11 December, after which she was formally commissioned into the fleet. During the latter tests, Sebenico reached a speed of 12.91 knots (23.91 km/h; 14.86 mph) at maximum power, slightly faster than Spalato but still well under the designed speed. Completion of the ship had been delayed by the redesign of the hull, which did not solve the speed problem. In early 1883, her propulsion system was rebuilt in another attempt to improve her speed, but on trials conducted on 28 July, she only made 12.81 knots (23.72 km/h; 14.74 mph) at full power and could manage an average of just 12.41 knots (22.98 km/h; 14.28 mph) for extended steaming.

On 2 January 1884, Sebenico was assigned to the main Austro-Hungarian squadron. She went to Greece on 23 January and returned to Pola on 14 May, where she was decommissioned. She spent the next nine years in reserve, during which time she had four 47 mm (1.9 in) 33-cal. quick-firing guns installed, two on each broadside. She was reactivated on 31 August 1893 for service with the training squadron, which lasted from 1 September to 31 December. This duty consisted solely of training engine-room personnel. She repeated this service from 1 May to 7 August 1894, and she went on a cruise with the training squadron to the island of Tenedos from 1 October to 3 February 1895. From 26 September, she returned to engine-room training, though this was interrupted in November with an assignment to serve as the station ship in Constantinople, the capital of the Ottoman Empire. She served in this role until 7 May 1896, followed by a return to the training squadron from 22 October to the end of the year. In January 1897, she was sent to Piraeus, Greece.

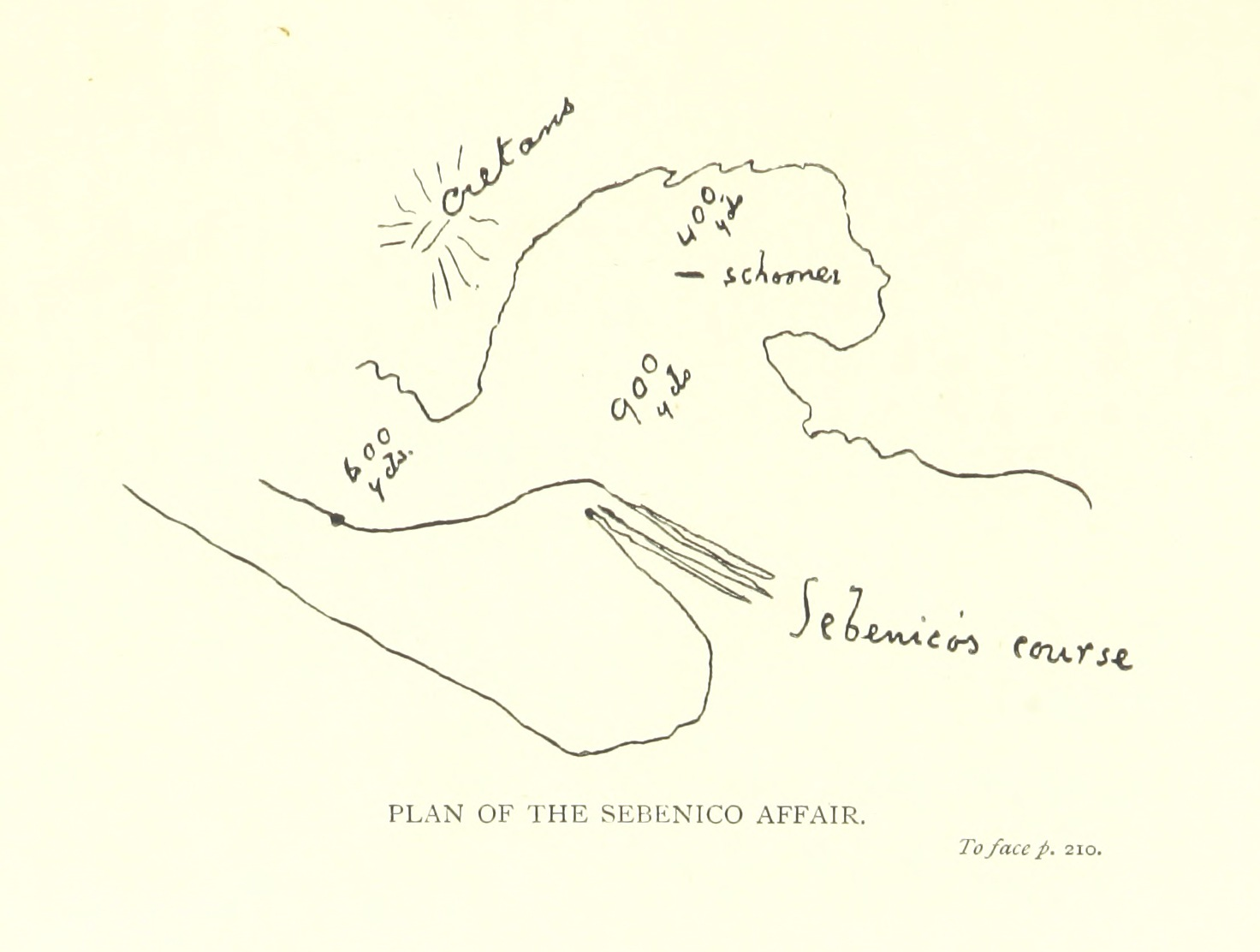
Victor Ritter Bless von Sambuchi, commander of Sebenico drew this sketch of the action of 17 March 1898

In February 1897, Sebenico deployed to Crete to serve in the International Squadron, a multinational force made up of ships of the Austro-Hungarian Navy, French Navy, Imperial German Navy, Italian Royal Navy, Imperial Russian Navy, and British Royal Navy that intervened in the 1897-1898 Greek uprising on Crete against rule by the Ottoman Empire. She arrived as part of an Austro-Hungarian contingent that also included the ironclad Kronprinzessin Erzherzogin Stephanie, the armored cruiser Kaiserin und Königin Maria Theresia, the torpedo cruisers Tiger and Leopard, three destroyers, and eight torpedo boats, the third-largest contingent in the International Squadron after those of the United Kingdom and Italy. Sebenico and the rest of the squadron arrived off Crete on 3 February 1898. On 17 March 1898, Sebenico intercepted and sank a Greek schooner trying to run the International Squadron's blockade of Crete off the island of Dia. The International Squadron operated off Crete until December 1898, but Austria-Hungary, displeased with the decision to create an autonomous Cretan State under the suzerainty of the Ottoman Empire, withdrew its ships in March 1898. Sebenico remained in service until 4 May 1898, when she was decommissioned and disarmed.

From 1898 to 1901, the ship remained out of service for re-boilering. She conducted trials on 20 May 1901 and reached a speed of 11.76 knots (21.78 km/h; 13.53 mph). She served as a boiler-room training ship from then to September, and in 1902 became a station ship in Cattaro Bay. Sebenico was converted into a tender for the artillery school in 1903. For this role, she had her armament revised, to include one 12 cm (4.7 in) gun, one 15 cm (5.9 in) gun, one 10 cm (3.9 in) gun, one 6.6 cm (2.6 in) gun, eight 47 mm guns, and two 37 mm (1.5 in) guns. On 13 January 1904, she assisted the Norddeutscher Lloyd steamship SS Calipso that had run aground off Medolino. Sebenico served with the artillery school until May 1915. During this period, after World War I broke out in July 1914, Sebenico was stationed as a guard ship in her namesake city. She was then assigned to the torpedo school in 1918, and served in that capacity to the end of the war. With Austria-Hungary's defeat, the Allies seized most of the Austro-Hungarian fleet as war prizes, and Sebenico was allocated to Italy in 1920, which scrapped her that year.
