= Anton Romako =

Austrian painter (1832–1889)

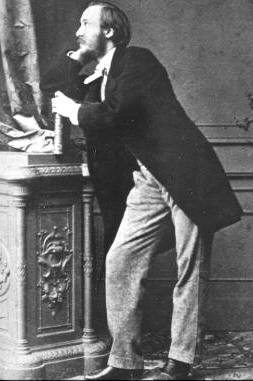
Anton Romako (ca. 1875)

Anton Romako (20 October 1832 – 8 March 1889) was an Austrian painter.

== Biography ==
Anton Romako was born in Atzgersdorf (now a cadastral commune of Liesing, Vienna), as an illegitimate son of factory owner Josef Lepper and his Czech housemaid Elisabeth Maria Anna Romako (Rhomako, Romakho, née Hromádko). His brother, Josef von Romako, became a Naval Architect-Inspector of Austro-Hungarian Navy. Romako studied painting at the Academy of Fine Arts Vienna (1847–49), but his teacher, Ferdinand Georg Waldmüller, considered him talentless. Later, he studied in Munich (1849) under Wilhelm Kaulbach, and subsequently in Venice, Rome and London. In the early 1850s, he studied privately in Vienna under Carl Rahl, whose style Romako adopted. In 1854 he began travels to Italy and Spain, and in 1857 settled in Rome as the favourite portrait, genre, and landscape painter for the local colony of foreigners.

In 1862 Romako married Sophie Köbel, the daughter of architect Karl Köbel, and the pair had five children before Sophie left Romako in 1875 for her lover. In 1876 Romako returned to Vienna but failed to re-establish himself against the style represented by Hans Makart and increasingly relied on the charity of such wealthy patrons as Count Kuefstein. He made study trips to Hungary, Italy and France, and during the years 1882 to 1884 he alternated between Paris and Geneva. Two daughters, Mathilde and Mary, committed suicide in 1887 and Romako never recovered from the shock. His last years were spent living in neglect near Vienna, where he died in poverty in 1889. Romako was buried at the Central cemetery in Vienna.

== Legacy ==
Dr. Oskar Reichel was essential in promoting Romako after his death, particularly with his 1913 show of collected works from his private collection. Reichel framed Romako as the “father” of a later artist, Oskar Kokoschka, stating that “the path from Romako leads to Kokoschka, the visionary amongst the young Viennese” in the show's introduction. Reichel also created the ongoing perception of Romako as an artist who connected the late-18th-century French school and the early-19th-century Viennese school by displaying his works between art from these two schools at the 1913 show.

Several paintings by Romako are confirmed or suspected of having been stolen from their Jewish owners in Nazi Germany, as they were purchased by art dealer Wolfgang Gurlitt, who bought several paintings from Jewish owners during this time period, and claimed to have lost his provenance records from 1933 to 1945. Paintings by Romako sold to Gurlitt include Ruine Liechtenstein, Don Quichotte, Barcarole, Herbst und Winter, Italiensche Landschaft mit Baurenhaus, The Spring, Nike With Wreath, and Nude of a Young Girl.

In 1953 a street in Atzgersdorf was named after the painter: Romakogasse. Anton Romako's painting The Battle of Lissa was selected as a motive for a recent commemorative coin: the 20 euro S.M.S. Erzherzog Ferdinand Max minted on September 15, 2004.

== Works ==
Romako painted a large number of landscape scenes (for example from Bad Gastein), influenced by the Barbizon school, but is known mostly for his portraits and historical scenes. His early works display the influence of Biedermeier realism, while the late works are painted in a nervous expressionist style which disturbed his contemporaries. More than a decade passed before his works were reconsidered and appreciated.

Nowadays Romako is seen as a trailblazing artist of the "Ringstraßenepoche" era. Many paintings of Anton Romako are shown in the Belvedere gallery in Vienna.

His famous portrait of empress Elisabeth, showing her eccentric personality, was generally rejected at the time. His best-known work, the portrait of Admiral Wilhelm von Tegetthoff during the naval Battle of Lissa, shows the admiral and a few sailors without the usual heroism at the moment when his ship Ferdinand Max is going to ram an Italian flagship.

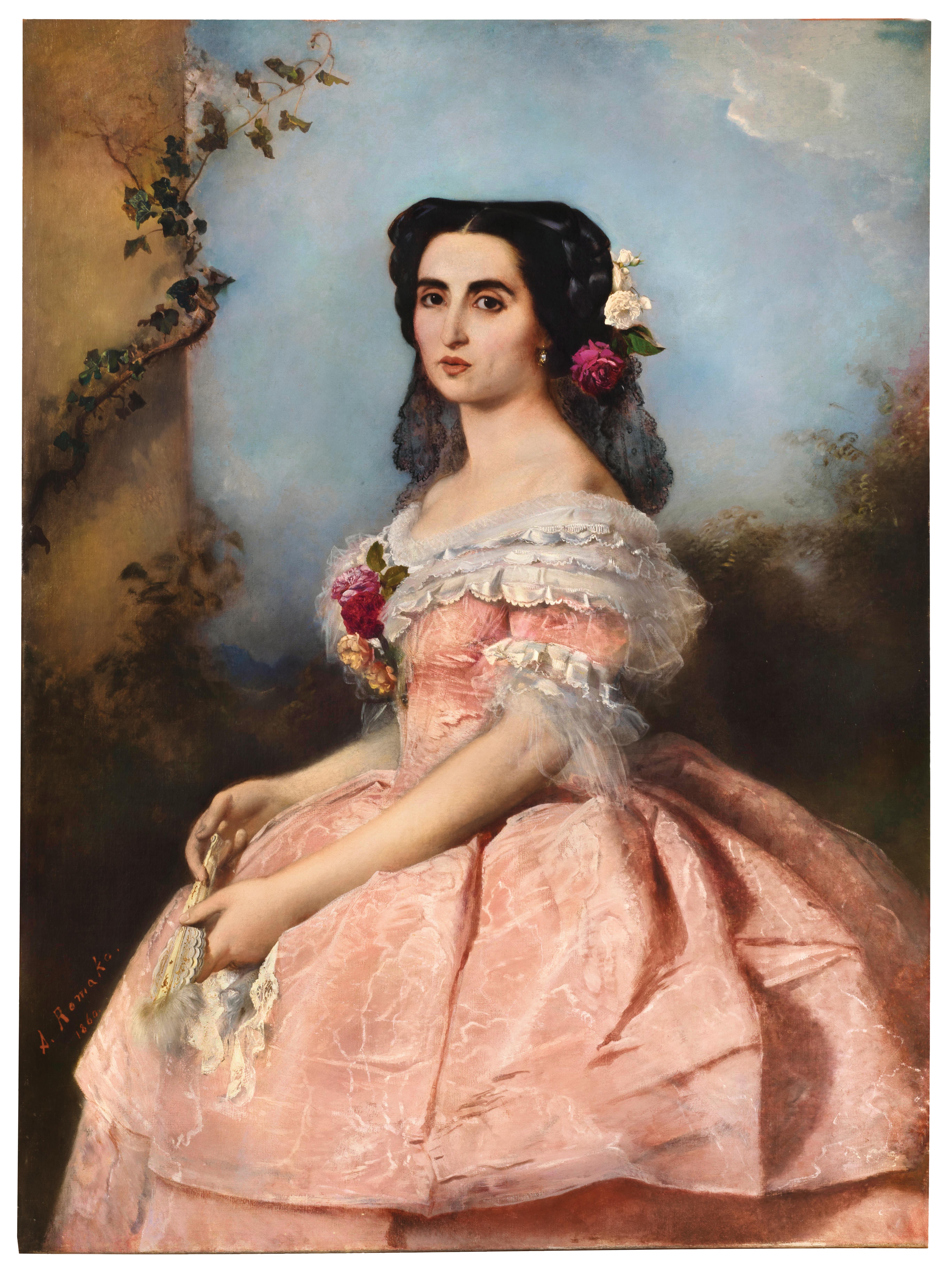
Example of his successful period in Rome (1860)

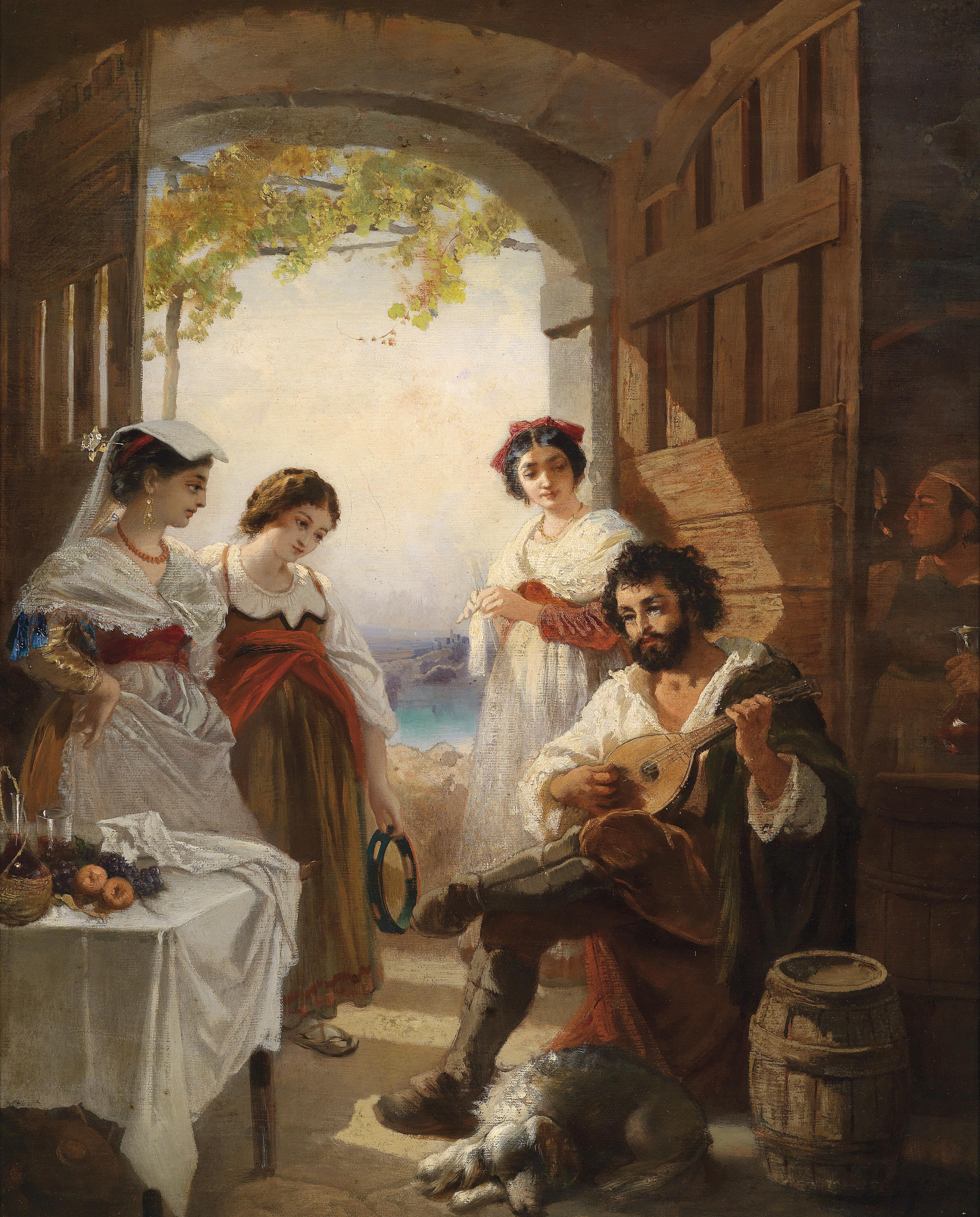
Neapolitan bar (Neapolitanische Schenke), before 1889

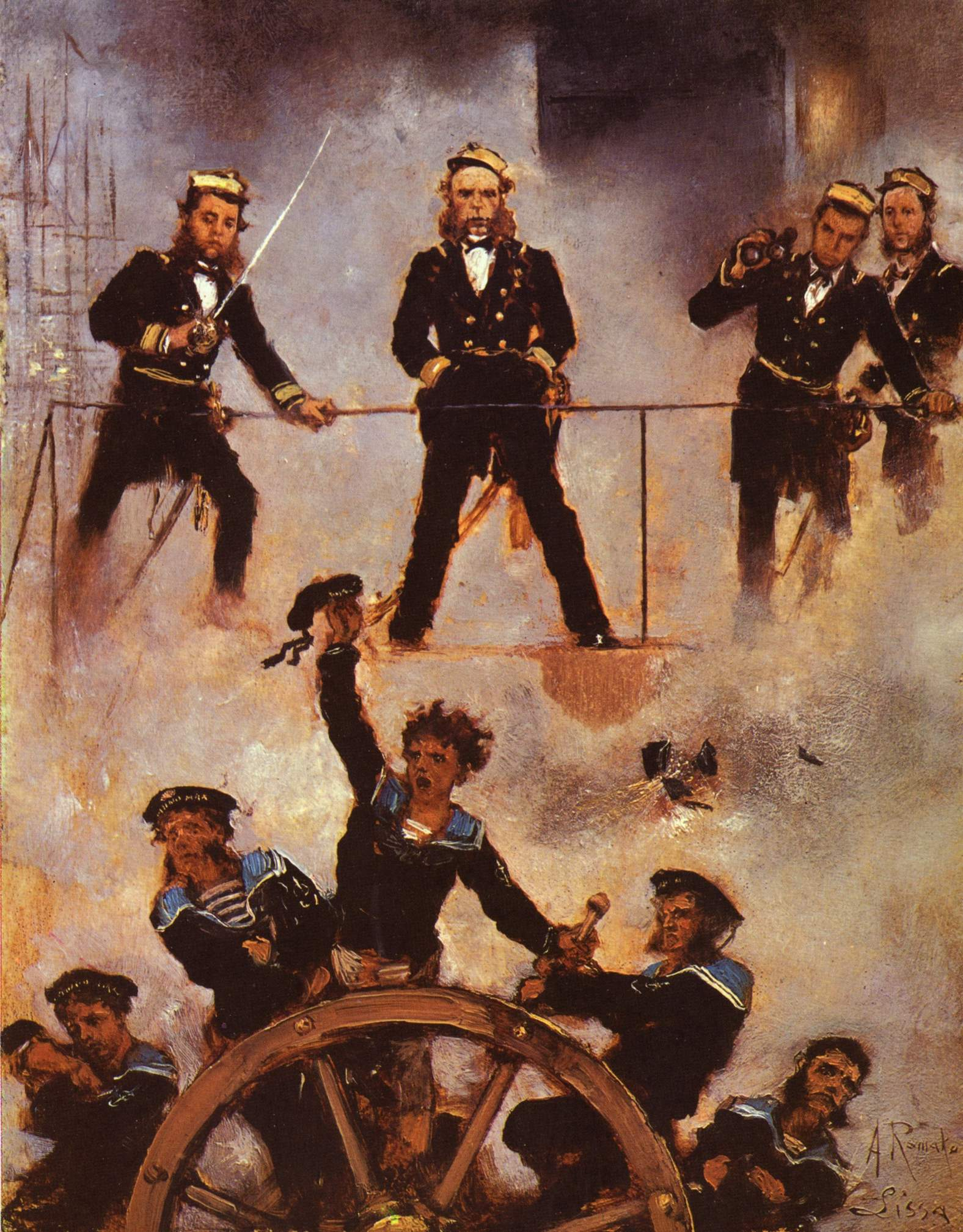
Tegethoff during the Battle of Lissa (Admiral Tegetthoff in der Seeschlacht bei Lissa II), 1878-1880

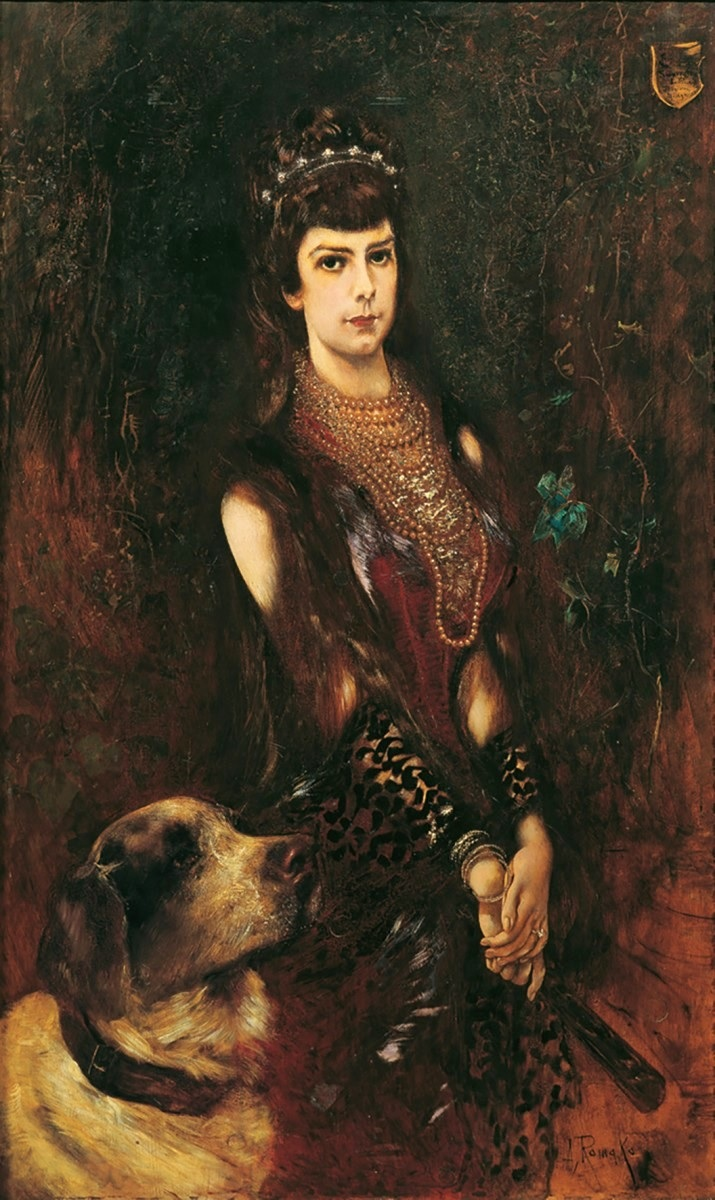
Empress Elisabeth (Kaiserin Elisabeth mit Bernhardinerhund), 1883

== List of works ==
S.M.S. Erzherzog Ferdinand Max coin inspired by a painting of Anton Romako.

- Die Eitelkeit - Porträt seiner Brau Sophie Köbel (Salzburg, Residenzgalerie), around 1860, oil on canvas, 124 x 91 cm
- Fischerknabe am Meeresstrand (Fisherboy at seashore) (Wien, Österreichische Galerie), around 1873–75, oil on wood, 90 x 70 cm
- Mädchen mit Kaninchen (Girl with a rabbit) (St. Pölten, Niederösterreichisches Landesmuseum), about 1877, oil on canvas, 72,7 x 60,6 cm
- Admiral Tegethoff in der Seeschlacht bei Lissa (Admiral Tegethoff at the 1866 naval battle of Lissa) (Wien, Österreichische Galerie), 1878–80, oil on wood, 110 x 82 cm
- Am Wasserfall (At the waterfall) (Wien, Leopold Museum), 1881, oil on canvas, 89,3 x 63 cm
- Kaiserin Elisabeth (Empress Elisabeth) (Wien, Österreichische Galerie), 1883
- Die Rosenpflückerin (Wien, Österreichische Galerie), 1883, oil on canvas, 89 x 66 cm
- Mutter und Kind (private collection), 1883, oil on canvas, 161 x 130 cm
- Junge Frau vor Bildstock (private collection), 1883, oil on wood, 54,4 x 45,5 cm
- Südfranzösische/Bretonische Bäuerin (Graz, Landesmuseum Joanneum), 1884, oil on canvas, 50,5 x 38,5 cm
- Mädchen, einen Fink anlockend (St. Pölten, Niederösterreichisches Landesmuseum), around 1884/85, oil on wood, 45,2 x 28 cm
- Bildnis Isabella Reisser (Wien, Leopold Museum), 1885, oil on canvas, 130.5 x 90 cm
- Salon der Familie Römer (Museen der Stadt Wien), 1887, oil on wood
- Dame in rotem Kleid (Wien, Österreichische Galerie), 1889, oil on canvas
- Portrait of August Wassermann (Budapest, Museum of Fine Arts)
- Girl on a Swing (Olga von Wassermann) (Northampton, MA, USA, Smith College Museum of Art), ca. 1882, oil on canvas, 160 x 122 cm
