= Josef von Romako =

Austro-Hungarian naval architect

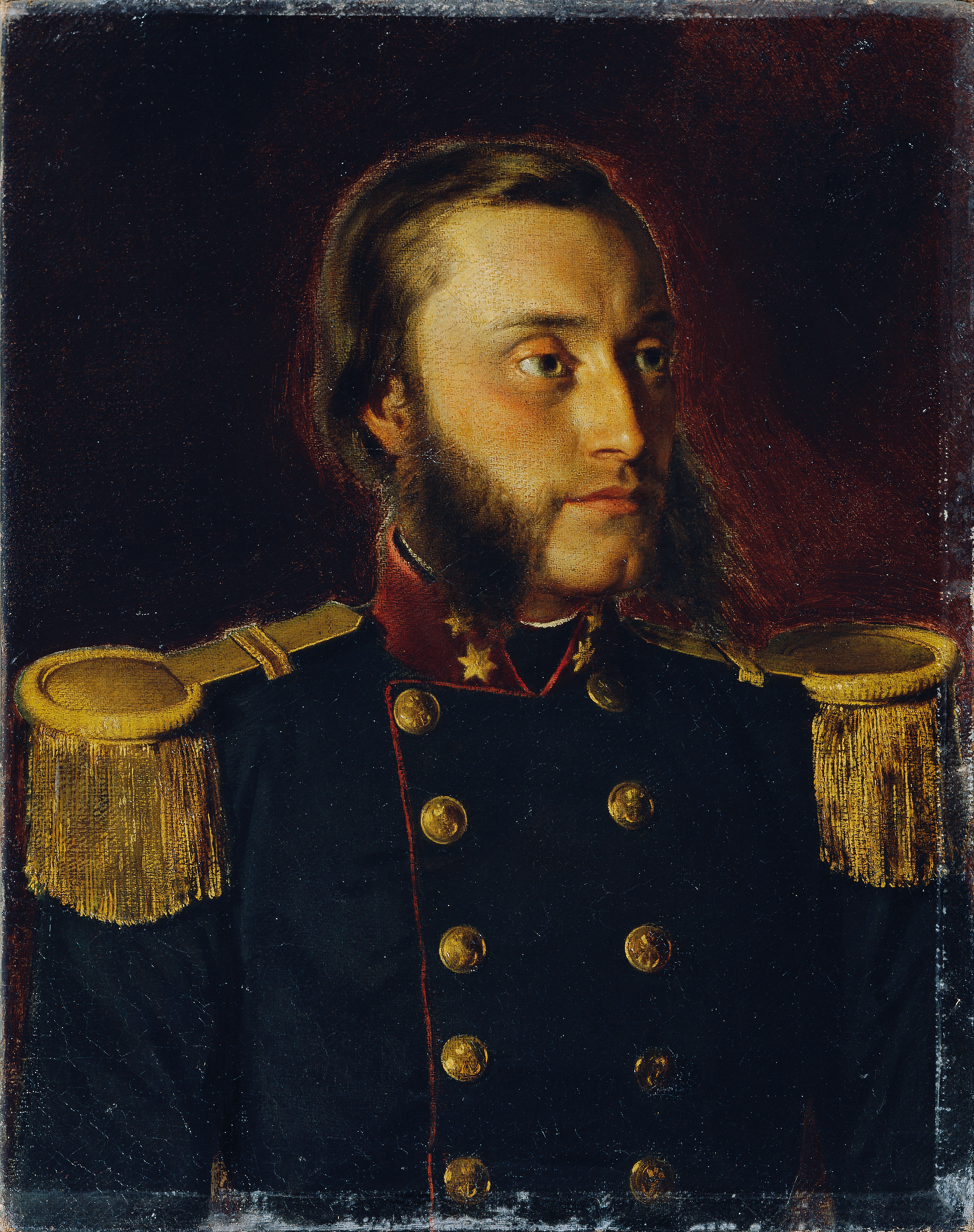
Painting of Josef von Ramako as Oberleutnant by his brother, Anton Romako. Housed in the Österreichische Galerie Belvedere

Josef Ritter von Romako (1828 – 5 June 1882) was an Austro-Hungarian naval architect in the 19th century. He was responsible for designing most of the ironclad warships of the Austro-Hungarian Navy, from the first vessels of the Drache class in the early 1860s to SMS Tegetthoff, built in the late 1870s and early 1880s. He was also responsible for designing the Zara-class cruisers.

== Career ==
He was born in 1828 in Atzgersdorf in Lower Austria and studied at the Technische Universität (Technical University) in Vienna. He joined the Austrian Navy and was appointed a provisional cadet on 25 September 1849. On 1 November 1859, he became the Schiffbau Oberingeniuer (main shipbuilding engineer), and it was during this period that he designed the Austrian ships that saw action at the Battle of Lissa on 20 July 1866. Romako's designs tended to emphasize stronger armor than foreign contemporaries.

On 1 November 1866, was promoted to the position of Schiffbau-Inspektor (Shipbuilding Inspector), and on 28 February 1870, he became the Obersten-Schiffbau-Ingeniuer. In the early 1870s, he designed the casemate ship Tegetthoff and later in the decade, he prepared the design for the first Austro-Hungarian torpedo cruisers of the Zara class and the follow-on vessel, Lussin. The cruisers were the first steel hulled vessels of the Austro-Hungarian fleet, and they represented a transition from the wooden sailing cruisers of the 1860s to the more modern steel cruisers of the 1880s. Romako based his design on the German aviso Zieten.

During the course of his career, he was awarded the Order of the Iron Crown, and he was ennobled in 1869. He also received the Danish Order of the Dannebrog and the Mexican Order of Guadalupe.

After a career spanning 33 years, he died on 5 June 1882.

== Family ==
His brother, Anton Romako, was a painter.
