= SMS Spalato =

Torpedo cruiser of the Austro-Hungarian Navy

- SMS Spalato early in her career

History

Austro-Hungarian Empire
- Name: Spalato
- Namesake: Spalato
- Builder: Stabilimento Tecnico Triestino
- Laid down: September 1878
- Launched: 30 August 1879
- Commissioned: September 1881
- Fate: Ceded to Italy and scrapped, 1920

General characteristics
- Class & type: Zara class
- Displacement: 833 long tons (846 t)
- Length: 62.71 m (205 ft 9 in)
- Beam: 8.22 m (27 ft)
- Draft: 4.1 m (13 ft 5 in)
- Installed power: 5 × fire-tube boilers; 1,370 PS (1,351 ihp)
- Propulsion: 2 × compound steam engines; 2 × screws
- Speed: 12.63 kn (23.39 km/h; 14.53 mph)
- Crew: 13 officers; 135 enlisted men
- Armament: 4 x 9-centimeter (3.5 in) 24-cal. guns; 1 x 7 cm (2.8 in) 15-cal. gun; 2 x 25 mm (0.98 in) Nordenfelt guns; 4 x torpedo tubes
- Armor: Deck: 19 mm (0.75 in)

SMS Spalato was a torpedo cruiser of the Austro-Hungarian Navy, the second member of the Zara class. She was laid down in September 1878, launched in August 1879, and commissioned in September 1881. Too slow to be used in her intended roles as a fleet scout and a flotilla leader, she was immediately taken ashore for several modifications to her propulsion system in an unsuccessful attempt to rectify the problem. As a result, she saw little active service, being used primarily for training purposes. She served in the artillery training school for most of the period between 1897 and 1914. During World War I, she served as a guard ship in Pola, and after the war was ceded to Italy as a war prize. She was broken up for scrap sometime thereafter.

== Design ==
Spalato was 62.71 meters (205 ft 9 in) long overall, with a beam of 8.22 m (27 ft) and a draft of 4.1 m (13 ft 5 in). She displaced 833 long tons (846 t). The ship's propulsion system consisted of a pair of two-cylinder vertical compound steam engines, with steam provided by five cylindrical fire-tube boilers. On trials, Spalato reached a speed of 12.63 knots (23.39 km/h; 14.53 mph) from 1,370 metric horsepower (1,351 ihp). Her crew numbered 13 officers and 135 enlisted men.

The ship's gun armament consisted of four 9-centimeter (3.5 in) 24-caliber (cal.) Breech-loading guns in single mounts, along with one 7 cm (2.8 in) 15-cal. breech-loading gun and two 25 mm (0.98 in) Nordenfelt guns. She was also armed with four torpedo tubes. The torpedo tubes were located singly, two in the bow and at either beam. Spalato was protected with a thin 19 mm (0.75 in) armored deck.

== Service history ==
Spalato was laid down in September 1878 by Stabilimento Tecnico Triestino at their San Rocco shipyard and launched on 30 August 1879. She was towed to Pola on 27 July 1880 to have her originally-fitted propellers replaced with larger screws, as had been done to her sister ship Zara in an attempt to increase her speed, as she had not reached her design speed of 15 knots (28 km/h; 17 mph). Spalato was commissioned into the fleet in September 1881. She was also too slow for use as a reconnaissance vessel or a leader of a torpedo boat flotilla. As a result, she saw little active service. Immediately after commissioning, Spalato was laid up ashore for major modifications. The bow torpedo tube was installed and her propulsion system was completely rebuilt. On 23 November 1884, she was re-launched and began sea trials, which had to be stopped on 24 October 1885 after the starboard engine was damaged in an accident. Full-power trials were finally conducted on 26 January 1886, during which Spalato proved to be even slower than Zara, managing only a maximum of 12.63 knots (23.39 km/h; 14.53 mph). Her average sustained speed was only 12.34 knots (22.85 km/h; 14.20 mph).

In 1886, a 47 mm (1.9 in) Hotchkiss gun was installed on her bow. Beginning on 25 May, Spalato replaced Zara in the torpedo training school while her sister was being modified for training duties. Spalato received four 47 mm 33-cal. quick-firing guns during this period. From 1888 to 1895, Spalato was decommissioned and placed in reserve. She was reactivated for four and a half months in 1896 for training exercises, and again for seven months in 1897 for training. On 1 August 1897, she was assigned to the artillery school with the old screw-frigate Radetzky. For this role, she received several 12 cm (4.7 in) and 15 cm (5.9 in) guns, all mounted on her stern. She began service with the artillery school on 14 January 1898 and was moored along the mole at Vergarolla outside Pola. In 1900, she was again reduced to the reserve; the following year, she was re-boilered and rearmed. She began sea trials on 24 December, reaching a speed of 11.13 knots (20.61 km/h; 12.81 mph). She returned to the artillery school in 1902, and remained there into 1914.

On 14 March 1914, Spalato was decommissioned, as she was by this time in very poor condition. After the outbreak of World War I, she was stationed as a guard ship outside Pola from 15 April 1914 to 24 May 1915. At some point in 1915, most of her guns were removed, apart from two of the 12 cm guns and the four 47 mm QF guns. With Austria-Hungary's defeat, the Allies seized most of the Austro-Hungarian fleet as war prizes, and Spalato was allocated to Italy, which scrapped her thereafter.
