= SMS Zara =

Torpedo cruiser of the Austro-Hungarian Navy

- SMS Zara early in her career

History

Austro-Hungarian Empire
- Name: Zara
- Namesake: Zara
- Laid down: 1 August 1878
- Launched: 13 November 1879
- Commissioned: 17 July 1882
- Fate: Ceded to Italy, 1920; Scrapped, 1921

General characteristics
- Class & type: Zara class
- Displacement: 833 long tons (846 t)
- Length: 62.71 m (205 ft 9 in)
- Beam: 8.22 m (27 ft)
- Draft: 4.1 m (13 ft 5 in)
- Installed power: 5 × fire-tube boilers; 1,800 PS (1,775 ihp)
- Propulsion: 2 × compound steam engines; 2 × screws
- Speed: Trials: 14.29 kn (26.47 km/h; 16.44 mph); Service: 14.02 kn (25.97 km/h; 16.13 mph)
- Crew: 13 officers; 135 enlisted men
- Armament: 4 x 9-centimeter (3.5 in) 24-cal. guns; 1 x 7 cm (2.8 in) 15-cal. gun; 2 x 25 mm (0.98 in) Nordenfelt guns; 4 x torpedo tubes
- Armor: Deck: 19 mm (0.75 in)

SMS Zara was a torpedo cruiser of the Austro-Hungarian Navy, the lead ship of the Zara class. She was laid down in August 1878, launched in November 1879, and commissioned into the fleet in July 1882. The ship was armed with a battery of light guns and four torpedo tubes. She proved to be poorly designed, being too slow for use as a fleet scout or as a flotilla leader for torpedo boats, so she saw little active service. Throughout the 1880s and 1890s, she was frequently in reserve, being activated infrequently to participate in training exercises. She served as a guard ship in Cattaro Bay for most of World War I, before being withdrawn for use as a cadet training ship in June 1917. She served in this capacity until the end of the war in 1918, and was ceded to Italy as a war prize in 1920. The Italian Navy had no use for the vessel, and sold her to ship breakers in 1921.

== Design ==
Zara was 62.71 meters (205 ft 9 in) long overall, with a beam of 8.22 m (27 ft) and a draft of 4.1 m (13 ft 5 in). She displaced 833 long tons (846 t). The ship's propulsion system consisted of a pair of two-cylinder vertical compound steam engines manufactured by Stabilimento Tecnico Triestino (STT), with steam provided by five cylindrical fire-tube boilers. On trials, Zara reached a speed of 14.29 knots (26.47 km/h; 16.44 mph) from 1,800 metric horsepower (1,775 ihp), though her average top speed was 14.02 knots (25.97 km/h; 16.13 mph). Her crew numbered 13 officers and 135 enlisted men.

The ship's gun armament consisted of four 9-centimeter (3.5 in) 24-caliber (cal.) Breech-loading guns in single mounts, along with one 7 cm (2.8 in) 15-cal. breech-loading gun and two 25 mm (0.98 in) Nordenfelt guns. She was also armed with four torpedo tubes. The torpedo tubes were located singly, two in the bow and at either beam. Zara was protected with a thin 19 mm (0.75 in) armored deck.

== Service history ==
The keel for Zara was laid down on 1 August 1878 at the government shipyard in Pola. She was launched on 13 November 1879, after which STT delivered her engines. Zara's construction marked the first major use of domestically produced Bessemer steel by the Austro-Hungarian Navy. Initial sea trials were scheduled for 28 and 29 April 1881, but a severe storm delayed them until 6 May. On her speed trials, she reached an average speed of 14.12 knots (26.15 km/h; 16.25 mph), less than her designed speed of at least 15 knots (28 km/h; 17 mph). The naval engineer A. Waldvogel proposed replacing the bronze screw with a larger steel one to increase her speed, though during sea trials held between 14 and 24 November, she only reached an average of 14.02 knots (25.97 km/h; 16.13 mph) with the new screw at full power.

On 17 July 1882, Zara was commissioned into the Austro-Hungarian fleet. Upon entering service, Zara was found to have several significant defects; she rolled badly, was insufficiently ventilated, and her bow-mounted torpedo tube did not work as effectively as intended. She was also too slow for use as a reconnaissance vessel or a leader of a torpedo boat flotilla. As a result, she saw little active service. In September, Zara participated in a demonstration of the fleet's torpedo vessels for Kaiser Franz Joseph I in Pola. Franz Joseph came aboard Zara to observe a group of torpedo boats launch an attack against an old schooner. In 1885, the bow torpedo launcher was rebuilt, and in 1886 she was assigned to the torpedo training school. That year, a 47 mm (1.9 in) Hotchkiss gun was installed on her bow. Four more 47 mm guns, of the quick-firing L/33 type, were added in 1887, with two on each broadside.

Zara spent much of her career in reserve, activated periodically to take part in training exercises. She was placed in reserve in 1888, but was reactivated temporarily in 1889 to take part in the summer training cruise. She remained out of service from 1890 to 17 March 1894, when she was recommissioned to assist a British steamship, SS Palmyra, which had run aground off Medolino. This work was completed by 1 April, after which Zara was again laid up. She returned to service with the torpedo school in 1897, and the following year she was re-boilered. Work was finished in 1899 and sea trials were conducted from 14 to 26 August, during which Zara reached a speed of 10.94 knots (20.26 km/h; 12.59 mph). The ship was placed back in reserve in 1900. The following year, she participated in the summer training cruise.

She spent 1902 in reserve, but served in the torpedo school from 1903 to 1906, during which time she was converted fully into a training ship. She conducted training cruises along the Dalmatian coast from 1907 to 16 September 1913. On 14 October, she was reduced to a tender for the torpedo school, a role she held to May 1914. She was assigned to the training school for naval cadets on 21 May, but this service was short lived. She was converted into a guard ship on 28 June and stationed in Cattaro Bay, the same day that Archduke Franz Ferdinand was assassinated in Sarajevo, the catalyst for the start of World War I a month later. She served in that role until June 1917.

She returned to the cadet training school, and on 18 June left Cattaro for Pola. At 12:55 while cruising off the island of Lacroma, an accidental explosion tore a large hole in the bow, though the damage was above the waterline, allowing Zara to make port in Ragusa. The shipyard there effected temporary repairs to ensure her hull was strong enough to allow her to continue on to Pola, which she reached on 26 June. In Pola, a commission determined that the cause of the explosion was a badly deteriorated warhead in one of her two torpedoes, though some later sources state she struck a naval mine. After her bow was permanently repaired, Zara served in the training school until the end of the war in November 1918. With Austria-Hungary's defeat, the Allies seized most of the Austro-Hungarian fleet as war prizes, and Zara was allocated to Italy, which scrapped her by 1921.
