= St Peter's Cathedral, Alessandria =

Former cathedral in Piedmont, Italy

St. Peter's Cathedral
- Chiesa cattedrale di San Pietro
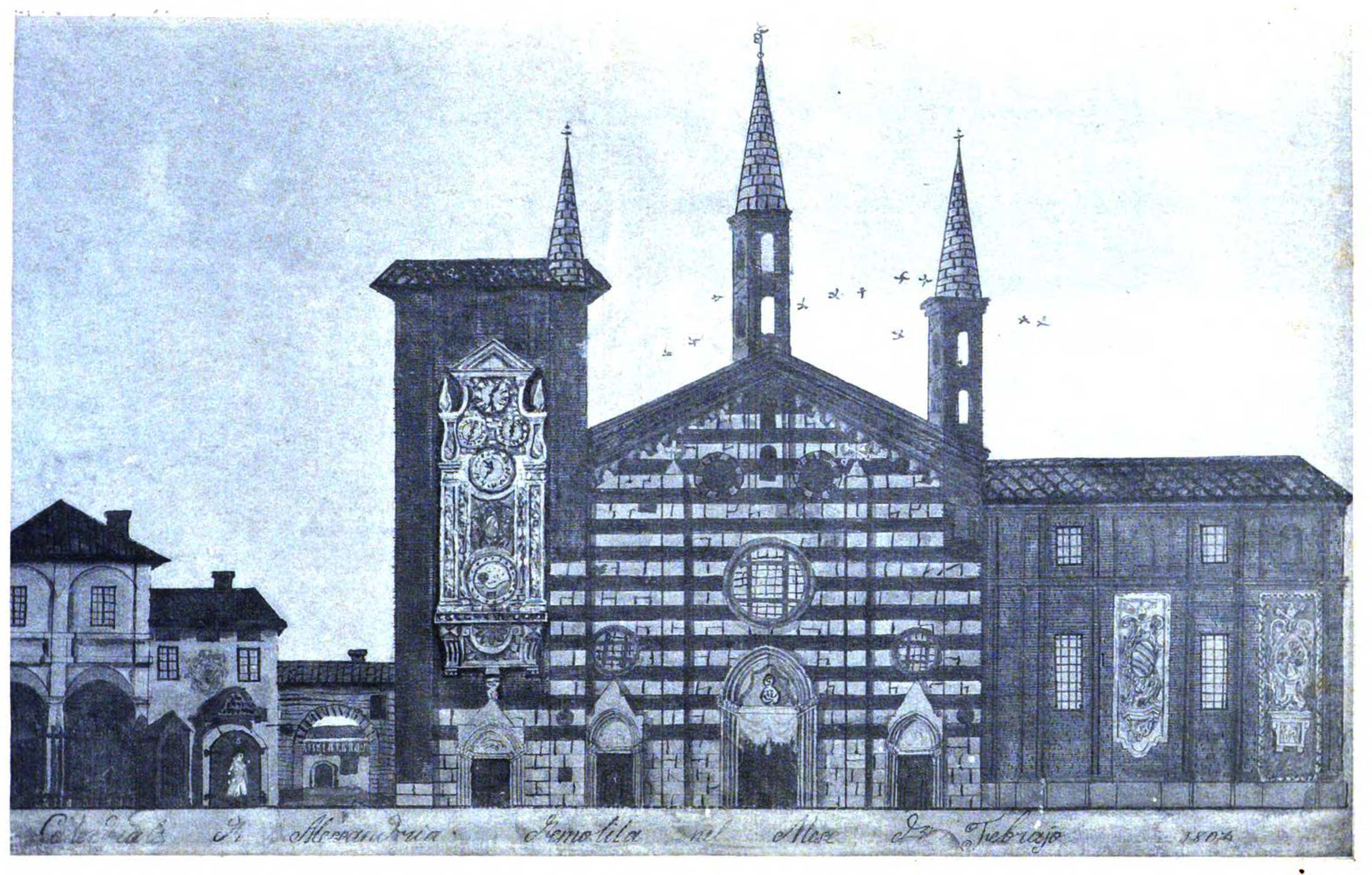
- The cathedral's façade, watercolour, 19th century
- St. Peter's Cathedral
- Location: Alessandria
- Country: Italy
- Denomination: Roman Catholic

History
- Status: Former cathedral
- Dedication: Saint Peter

Architecture
- Functional status: Demolished in 1803
- Architect: Ruffino Bottino
- Style: Romanesque architecture, Italian Gothic architecture
- Groundbreaking: 1170

Administration
- Diocese: Roman Catholic Diocese of Alessandria della Paglia

St Peter's Cathedral was the former cathedral of Alessandria in Piedmont, Italy, and the bishop's seat of the Diocese of Alessandria. The cathedral was built between 1170 and 1175 and originally stood on the south-eastern side of Platea Maior, today's Piazza della Libertà.

The construction of the cathedral, which started immediately upon the founding of the city itself (on 3 May 1168), marked the beginning of a long architectural and cultural process. The cathedral was demolished one century after its construction owing to the growth in Alessandria's population, and was rebuilt between 1291 and 1297 by the architect Ruffino Bottino. It underwent significant transformations down the centuries: enlargements, renewals and multiple adaptations contributed in modelling its appearance, up until its final demolition between February and July 1803 at the order of Napoleon. The building was deemed unsuitable, indeed "too bulky", in the context of the town's functional reorganization desired by the French emperor.

Though it is no longer standing, St Peter's Cathedral deserves a special attention under the historical and cultural profile. It represented a meeting point between the civic and ecclesiastical interests, reflecting the long history of Alessandria's community. It was one of the main witnesses of the cultural and artistic resources of Alessandria and it narrated, through its own architecture and its vicissitudes, the town's life and transformation.

Reconstruction of the appearance and the history of a lost monument is always a difficult task, especially the earliest periods, for which sources are often incomplete or altered by legends and devotions. The only way to gain an understanding of the cathedral's original appearance is through the surviving iconographies, the accounts of travellers or direct observers, and the detailed descriptions given by the reports of pastoral visits. These documents, though limited, allow one a glimpse of the cathedral's former greatness and importance. St Peter's Cathedral, despite its absence in today's urban scenario, remains a powerful symbol of Alessandria's history and a place of collective memory.

== History ==
=== Historical and geographical context: the founding of Alessandria ===
Between the 8th and the 10th century the area that was to become Alessandria was scarcely inhabited, with the exception of certain royal courts which dated back to ancient settlements: Forum (Villa del Foro), Roboretum (Rovereto), Bergolium (Bergoglio), Marenghum (Spinetta Marengo) and Gamondium (Gamondio, then Castellazzo Bormida).

Moreover, there were some autonomous centres like Solerium (Solero), Quargnentum (Quargnento) and Felizzano. The administrative and political structure of the time did not allow for a significant cultural and social development of the inhabitants. Nevertheless, the latter kept trading among each other, growing in experience and wealth. The aforementioned settlements developed further and grew until they eventually merged and gave birth to the city called Alessandria. It is important to remark that, de facto, Alessandria already existed before its formal foundation, as the villages of that area already had numerous relationships with the bordering territories: purchase and sale of land, alliances and agreements, among which the military and trading pact that Gamondio sealed with the Genoese Republic. Already in its first years, Alessandria profited from its strategic position at the confluence between rivers Tanaro and Bormida.

In the same period, and perhaps even before, some churches were built, among which the most important is that of Santa Maria di Castello in the heart of Rovereto, which is still standing today.

The city of Alessandria was therefore initially founded by the union of Gamondium, Marenghum and Bergolium, as it follows from the text of the 1184 complaints against Cremona of the emperor Frederick Barbarossa, in which the new city's promoters and founders are referred to: "de tribus locis, Gamunde vicelicet et Meringin et Burgul". The three villages were soon joined by Roboretum, Solerium, Forum, Vuilije (Oviglio) and Quargnentum. Economic support came from the Genoese Republic and the communes of the Lombard League, in opposition to the March of Montferrat, the main ally of Barbarossa.

Alessandria was in practice born all of a sudden, but in a context of illegality, as its foundation had neither been authorized nor approved by the Holy Roman Empire. The city also emerged in violation of the rights of the marquis of Montferrat, occupying territories that were theoretically in his possession with no legal basis. Alessandria's condition was complex even in the regards of the Church, as it could not constitute itself as a unique community of believers under the jurisdiction of the Holy See. The newly established city was a mix of civic groups, each of which maintained its parish and diocese affiliations, according to the place of origin. The ecclesiastical problems eventually turned out to be very sensitive, as the borders of five ancient dioceses merged in the area of Alessandria, each of them claiming rights and possession of important religious entities.

Brother James of Acqui states, in his Chronica Aquensia: "[...] Causa autem quare Alexandria fuit facta est ista, quia Marchiones Montisferrati gravabant illa loca, quae se simul posuerunt, quae sunt Rovetum, Marenchum, Gamondium et Bergolium". (Note: 'The reason why Alessandria was founded was this: the Marquises of Montferrat were oppressing those places, which joined together, namely Rovereto, Marengo, Gamondio, and Bergoglio.')

The official date of foundation of Alessandria is 3 May 1168, even though by that time the city was already well defined in topographical, urbanistic and administrative terms.

=== 12th century: the foundation ===
The need to build the cathedral was not just religious, but also civic, political and strategical, the newly established city representing the merging of different people and interests. Starting from the city foundation, many conditions gave rise to the [synoecism|synecystic process] which gave birth to Alessandria:

- the name "Alessandria", after Pope Alexander III, great supporter of the Lombard League against the Holy Roman Empire, who had excommunicated Frederick Barbarossa;
- the Genoan Republic, which financed the city foundation to protect its own trading routes;
- the diocese of Milan, which provided protection to the new town in a context of opposition to the Empire;
- the local powers, which felt the need to affirm their autonomy in the regards of the marquises of Montferrat and of Bosco.

As found in the Municipal Acts of the Cathedral's Vestrymen, the city's foundation act also sanctions the will to build the cathedral: "et così tutti insieme fu stabilito si facesse la Chiesa Cathedrale". (Note: 'And so, all together, it was decided to make the cathedral church.') Thus, the first news dates back to mid-12th century, when a first church, dedicated to Saint Peter, was built between 1170 and 1175: "et del subito si diede avviso à Sua Santità, il quale mandò fosse intitolato Santo Pietro". (Note: 'And immediately notice was given to His Holiness, who gave order to dedicate [the church] to Saint Peter.') Alessandria then faced the need to consolidate its own administrative and religious structure to assert its political and territorial independence. This implied the acknowledgement by means of a superior authority and the institution of a urban community (plebs civitatis) organized around a cathedral (ecclesia major), which would act both as a spiritual and civic centre. To sum up, the establishment of an ecclesiastical authority in Alessandria took place in two distinct phases, both crucial for the legitimation and the development of the city as an independent centre of power. The first phase was an act of donation of land to the pope for building the cathedral; the second phase was the creation of the diocese.

==== Act of donation ====
Original Latin text

Anno Milleno centino terqueviceno,
his iunctis octo fuit Alexandria facta,
et fù dalli otto Luoghi divisa in quatro quartieri
cioè Gamondio, Marengho, Roboreto, Bergoglio
et insieme con li elletti di Quargnento, Solario, Villeforis, Uvilij,
li quali tutti sono li otto luoghi,
et così tutti insieme fù stabilito si facesse la Chiesa Cathedrale
[...]
et del subito si diede aviso à Sua Santità,
il quale mandò fosse intitolato Santo Pietro.

English translation

In the year one thousand one hundred and sixty-eight,
united these eight places was founded Alessandria,
and the eight places were divided into four quarters,
namely Gamondio, Marengo, Rovereto, and Bergoglio,
together with the elected representatives of Quargnento, Solero, Villa del Foro, Oviglio,
which together make up the eight places,
and thus they all agreed that the Cathedral Church should be built
[...]
and immediately notice was given to His Holiness,
who ordered that it be dedicated to Saint Peter.

(Fabbricieri della Cattedrale, fols. 7v–8r)

The act of donation of the church on behalf of the urban consuls is conserved in a 13th century copy of the city's Liber Crucis, as evidenced by Francesco Gasparolo in his critical edition from 1889, in which he indicates that Amizone Butraffo, podestà at the time, ordered to the public notaries to copy all the important documents of the history of the municipality into a unique volume. Among these, the De ficto dando domino pape was copied as well: it is a document about the donation of the church, poised to become cathedral, the loyalty of the city to the pope and the institution of a tax to be paid yearly on St. Martin's Day. In January 1170, the city's consuls, Rufino Bianchi and Guglielmo de Bergasce, purchased a land on which to erect the church. The two men, on behalf of the new civic institutions, the consules and the populus, donated the area to Pope Alexander III: "Deo, et Beato Pietro, et vobis prefato D. Papae Alexandro [...] in perpetuum terram proprii juris nostri, quae est infra praedictam civitatem quam populus ipsius ad costituendam sibi ecclesiam emit". (Note: 'To God, and to Blessed Peter, and to You, foretold Lord Pope Alexander [...] forever the land of our own right, which is found within the aforementioned city, whose people purchased to constitute a church for themselves.') The act redacted for this circumstance is composed of four main sections:

- a list of cardinals and deacons present at the papal court while writing the document;
- a description of the consuls' donation (which took place via the feudal form donatio per fustem, with a young tree delivered as asymbol for the investiture), which regarded an area destinated to building a major church, meant as the entire municipality's religious and representative centre, well distinguished from the other existing churches in the curtes of Rovereto, Gamondio, Marengo and Bergoglio;
- a description of the annual census due by Alessandria to the Holy See, a financial commitment documented in the Liber Censuum and to be paid every year on St. Martin's Day. The distribution of tax burden, which has been the object of different interpretations, required three quarters of the total to be provided by the social classes of milites, mercatores and possessores, while the remaining fourth would have been charged to the less wealthy groups of citizens. Such provision implicitly emphasizes the future cathedral's right to collect tithes;
- a conclusion containing an oath of loyalty to the Roman Church.

The original Latin text of the donation and its English translation are as follows:

Original Latin text

In nomine domini. Anno dominice incarnacionis Millesimo centesimo sexagesimo nono et undecimo pontificatus domini nostri Alexandri tertii summi pontificis et universalis pape, mensi ianuario tercia indicione. Nos Rufinus blancus et Willelmus de bergasce, consules de civitate Alexandrie notum facimus quidem in presencia dominorum bernardi portuensis episcopi Ubaldi tituli sancte crucis, Iohannis tituli sanctorum iohannis et pauli, Ildeprandi tituli basilice duodecim apostolorum, Iohannis tituli sancte anestaxie, Alberti tituli sancti laurencii in lucina, Guillelmi tituli sancti petri a vincula, Bosci tituli sancte potenciane, Petri tituli sancti laurencii in damaso, Iohannis tituli marcii, Teodini tituli sancti vitalis presbiterorum cardinalium et Iacinalii sancte marie in cosmidin, Cencii sancti adriani, Mainfredi sancti georgii, Ugonis sancti eustachii, et Petri sancte marie in aquiro diaconorum cardinalium et subscriptorum testium qui ad hoc rogati venerunt, Petri videlicet Sarazeni senescalchi, Iohannis Ancille Dei seneschalchi, Petri buticularii, Alberti et Albertinelli ostiariorum, ex parte omnium consulum et populi predicte civitatis per fustes offerimus deo et beato petro et vobis prefacto domino nostro pape Alexandro vestrisque catholicis successoribus sancteque romane ecclesie in perpetuum terram scilicet proprii iuris nostri que est infra predictam civitatem quam populus ipsius civitatis ad constituendam ibi ecclesiam emit.
Et per eandem investituram volumus terram ipsam omni tempore romane ecclesie iure proprietario pertinere. Preterea de comuni conscilio Consulum et totius populi mandato militum domos et mercatorum et quorum facultas videbitur sufficiens ad boves abendos de singulis domibus tres denarios quidem terre in festo beati Martini exsolvent singulis annis. Ceteri de singulis domibus unus denarius et infra octavas beati Martini solvent ei cui romanus pontifex iusserit. Consules vero qui per tempora ibi constituentur fidelitatem vobis vestrisque successoribus omni occasione et contradicione remota iurabunt. Nos quoque demandato aliorum consulum et populi civitatis vobis fidelitatem fecimus. Et populus quando communiter iurabunt consulibus singulis, scilicet trienniis sicut constitutum est, iurabunt pariter et romano pontifici hoc scriptum quia interfui scripsi.
Ego Fulco notarius et scriba sacri beneventiani pallacii.
Ego Petrus sarazenus senescalcus
Ego Albertinus hostiarius
Ego Guiscardus
Ego Albertus hostiarius
Ego Petrus buticularius
Ego Petrus qui dicor ferrarius notarius sacri palatii auctenticum huius instrumenti vidi et legi et ut in illo reperi in hoc scripsi nichil addens vel muttans preter punctum sillabam vel litteram.
Ego Willelmus notarius sacri Palatii auctenticum huius instrumenti vidi et legi et subscripsi.
Ego Otto notarius sacri Palatii auctenticum huius instrumenti vidi et legi et subscripsi.

English translation

In the Lord's name. The year since the incarnation one thousand one hundred and seventy, eleventh of the pontificate of our lord the supreme pontiff and universal pope Alexander III, in the month of January, third indiction. We, Rufino Bianchi and Guglielmo di Bergasce, consuls of the City of Alessandria - in presence of the cardinals Bernardo bishop Portuensis, Ubaldo of the title of the Holy Cross, Giovanni of the title of Saints John and Paul, Ildebrando of the title of the Basilica of the twelve apostoles, Giovanni of the title of Saint Anastasia, Alberto of the title of Saint Lawrence in Lucina, Guglielmo of the title of Saint Peter in Vincoli, Bosco of the title of Saint Podenziana, Pietro of the title of Saint Lawrence in Damaso, Giovanni of the title of Saint Marc, Teodino of the title of Saint Vitale, with the deacons Iacinale of Saint Mary in Cosmedin, Cencio of Saint Hadrian, Mainfredo of Saint George, Ugone of Saint Eustace, and Pietro of Saint Mary in Aquiro, and with the subscripted witnesses who were called to draft this act, namely Pietro Saraceno seneschal, Giovanni Ancilla Dei seneschal, Pietro buticular, the innkeepers Alberto and Albertinello - on the part of the Consuls and the People of the aforementioned City, we offer "per fustes" and forever to God, to Blessed Peter, and to you our lord Pope Alexander and to your successors and to the Holy Roman Church, the land of our full right which is located within the aforementioned City and that the people of the City purchased to constitute a church on it.
Through the same investiture we want that said land remain property of the Church of Rome forever. Moreover, based on the will commonly expressed by the Consuls and the People, we determine that the milites, the mercatores and all who own cattle, for every home ownership, will have to pay every year on Saint Martin's Day the sum of three denarii for this land; the others, for every home ownership, one denarius, which they will pay by the octave of Saint Martin to whom will be commissioned by the Roman pontifex.
The Consuls in office from time to time will furthermore swear loyalty to you and your successors in every circumstance and without any contradiction. As to we ourselves, we declare our loyalty based on the mandate of the other Consuls and the People of the City. And the People, when the single Consuls will take their oath, hence every three years as it is established, will likewise swear to the Roman pontifex what was transcribed here.
I, Folco, notary and scribe of the Sacred Palace of Benevento,
I, Pietro Saraceno, seneschal,
I, Albertino, innkeeper,
I, Guiscardo,
I, Alberto, innkeeper,
I, Pietro, buticular,
I, Pietro, said Ferrario, notary of the Sacred Palace, have seen and read the original copy of this act and I have transcribed here what I found in it , without adding, removing, or changing anything, neither a period, nor a letter, nor a syllable.
I, Guglielmo, notary of the Sacred Palace, have seen, read and subscribed the original copy of this text.
I, Ottone, notary of the Sacred Palace, have seen, read and subscribed the original copy of this text.

(Liber Crucis, pp. 93-94)

Original Latin text

Allexander episcopus servus servorum dei dilectis filiis consulibus et universo clero et populo Allexandriæ salutem etc.
Sacrosanctæ Romanæ ecclesiæ celesti privilegio sibi collato semper licuit semperque licebit episcopales sedes divisas coniungere et coniunctas pro temporis necessitate dividere et in illis locis, in quibus nunquam episcopatus fuisse noscuntur, exigente et necessitate et utilitate, (f. 76’) episcopos ordinare. Sanctum enim Sardicense concilium statuit non passim episcopum ordinari, nisi aut in civitatibus, que episcopos habuerunt, aut que tam populose sunt, ut episcopum habere mereantur. Inde est, quod cognito vestro desiderio, quod nobis sæpe aperuistis totis affectibus exorantes, ut civitatem vestram pontificali dignitate decoraremus, ne defectum ecclesiasticorum sacramentorum sustineretis, recepta quoque instantissima petitione venerabilis fratris nostri Galdini archiepiscopi Apostolicæ Sedis legati, et consulum Mediolanensium necnon etiam rectorum Lombardiæ et Marchiæ, post habitam multam deliberationem de communi fratrum nostrorum consilio, ecclesiam et civitatem vestram, que in honorem beati Petri et ad profectum et exaltationem totius Lombardiæ edificata est, pontificali dignitate decoramus et dilecto filio Arduino subdiacono nostro, quem utique moribus et sanguine nobilem et litteratum scientia decoratum vobis in episcopum et pastorem concessimus, et successoribus eius ius episcopale in omnibus ecclesiis et cappellis castrorum et villarum, quarum habitatores ad habitandum in civitate vestra venerant, cuiuscumque hactenus fuerint, et nominatim Quernenti, Solor, Burgolii, Uville, Fori, Roboreti, Marengi et Gamundi, quorum habitatores Alexandriam inhabitare tenentur, perpetuo tradimus concedimus et auctoritate apostolica confirmamus. Statuentes, ut cuncti clerici et laici omnium prædictorum locorum ei obœdiant et de decimis et de omni pontificali iure tamquam proprio pastori respondeant; sicut solebant episcopis suis respondere, ita quod laici decimas non debeant ulterius in feodo vel alio titulo possidere. Prohibemus etiam, ne clerici extra Alexandriam, in aliquo supradictorum locorum, donec persecutio Friderici dicti Imperatoris duraverit, missas vel sepulturas, baptismus vel alia divina officia celebrare præsumant. Præterea plebem de Masio, cum omnibus pertinentiis suis, plebem de Ponto cum omnibus capellis et pertinentiis suis, post mortem venerabilis fratris nostri Petri Papiensis Episcopi, plebem de Cassinis cum omnibus capellis et pertinentiis suis et plebem de Porta similiter ecclesie vestre duximus concedendas. Volumus autem, ut predictus electus a venerabili fratri nostro Galdino Mediolanensi Archiepiscopo, Apostolicæ Sedis legato, in diaconum et presbyterum ordinent35et de manu eius munus consecrationis percipiat et tam ipse quam successores ipsius ei et successoribus suis tamquam metropolitanis suis debitam obœdentiam exhibeant et honorem, sicut alii suffraganei Mediolanensis ecclesiæ facere noscuntur.
Decernimus ergo, quod nulli omnino hominum liceat prefatam ecclesiam temere perturbare aut eius possessiones auferre aut ablatas retinere minuere aut quibuslibet molestiis fatigare, sed omnia integra (f. 77) et illibata serventur eorum, pro quorum gubernatione ac sustentatione concessa sunt usibus omnimodis profutura, salva sedis apostolice auctoritate37et Mediolanensis archiepiscopi canonica reverentia. Si qua igitur in futurum ecclesiastica secularisve persona hanc nostre constitutionis paginam sciens contra eam temere venire temptaverit, secundo tertiove commonita nisi reatum suum digna satisfactione correxerit, potestatis honorisque sui dignitate careat reamque se divino iudicio existere et a sanguine dei et domini redemptoris nostri Iesu Christi aliena fiat atque in extremo examine districte ultioni subiaceat. Cunctis autem eidem loco sua iura servantibus sit pax domini nostri Iesu Christi, quatenus hic fructum bone actionis percipiant et apud districtum iudicem premia eterne pacis inveniant. Amen.

English translation

Alexander Bishop, servant of the servants of God, greets the beloved sons consuls and all the clergy and the people of Alessandria. To the sacrosant Roman Church, thanks to the celestial privilege to it conferred, was and will always be lawful to merge divided episcopal seats and divide merged seats, according to the needs of the moment, and, in those places in which there have never been episcopates to create some, if such is required by necessity and utility. The Council of Sardi indeed stated that no bishops shall be created if not in those cities in which they were present in the past or in those cities which became so populous to deserve the creation of a bishop.
From this it follows that, known your desire, several times manifested to us with heartfelt pleas, of honouring your city of the apostolic dignity so that you should not suffer the lack of ecclesiastic sacraments, also received the insistent request of the venerable Archbishop Galdino, our confrere and delegate of the Holy See, and of the consuls of Milan, and of the rectors of Lombardy and of the March, upon a long reflection about the unanymous will of our confreres, we establish to honour your church and your city community, constituted in honour of St. Peter and for the utility and glory of whole Lombardy, with the episcopal dignity and to our beloved son Arduino, noble in costumes and birth and cultured, whom we have conceded to you as bishop and pastor, and to his successors we give, concede and confirm forever in virtue of the apostolic authority the episcopal right in all the churches and chapels of the castles and villages whose inhabitants have moved to live in your [new] city, whoever they depended on in the past, namely Quargnento, Solero, Bergoglio, Oviglio, Foro, Rovereto, Marengo and Gamondio: the inhabitants of these places are required to have residence in Alessandria and all the clergy and laity of the same places will obey to the bishop as to their pastor, in the way they used to do with to the bishops of their earlier dioceses, so that the laity shall no longer in the future hold tithes neither in fief, nor in different title.
We also prohibit clerics, until the persecution of Frederick Emperor will last, to celebrate services, burials, baptisms and the divine offices out of the city of Alessandria in any of the aforementioned places. In the same way we concede to your church the parish churches of Masio, with all its appliances, of Ponto, with its chapels and appliances (upon the death of our venerable brother Peter, bishop of Pavia), of Cassine with its chapels, and of Porta.
We want the elected Arduino to receive the ordination as a deacon and as a priest from our venerable brother Galdino, archbishop of Milan and bound to the Apostolic See, and from his hands may he also obtain the gift of consecration. We also have him, as well as his successors, owe obedience and honour to the metropolitan bishops, so as the other suffragans of the Milanese Church do.
We finally establish that nobody shall be allowed to disturb the Church of Alessandria in its possessions or to subtract them, or - if they were subtracted - to detain, reduce or subject them to any harassment; all its possessions shall be conserved intact available solely to achieve government and livelihood purposes, without prejudice to the authority of the Apostolic See and the canonical observance due to the archbishop of Milan.
If in the future any ecclesiastical or secular, knowing our present decision, will try to oppose it and, upon the second or third admonition, he will not have given worthy satisfaction to the crime committed, shall he be deprived of any power and honour, and shall he be removed from the communion with the blood of the divine Redeemer and subjected to the final punishment on the day of judgement.
Shall all those who instead will respect its rights receive the peace of our Lord Jesus Christ to obtain the fruit of good deed and the prize of the ethernal peace by the Supreme Judge. Amen.

(Codice 5077)
