= Emilio Faà di Bruno =

Faà di Bruno in dress uniform

Emilio Faà di Bruno (7 March 1820 – 20 July 1866) was an Italian naval officer. He was born in the Kingdom of Sardinia and was a key figure in the unification of Italy and the creation of the Royal Italian Navy. Between 1863 and 1864 he toured the coast of North America, protecting Italian interests and engaging in naval diplomacy. He died at the Battle of Lissa.

== First and Second Wars of Independence ==
Faà di Bruno was born in Alessandria to Lodovico, Marchese di Bruno, and Carolina Sappa de' Milanesi. His brothers were the missionary Giuseppe and the mathematician Francesco. Emilio entered the naval academy at Genoa as a youth and received his first experience at sea on the frigate Des Geneys. He reached the rank of ensign in 1837 and ensign first class in 1839. As a lieutenant, he participated in the First Italian War of Independence against the Austrian Empire in 1848–49. He served under Admiral Giuseppe Albini aboard the corvette Malfatano and the frigate San Michele in the Adriatic, during the search for the Austrian fleet between the mouths of the rivers Piave and Tagliamento and in the blockade of Trieste.

After the war, Faà di Bruno retired for family reasons, but he was recalled when the Conte di Cavour, then minister of the navy, appointed him naval attaché to the Sardinian embassy in London. There he met and, on 29 October 1851, married Agnes Huddleston. During the Second Italian War of Independence, he distinguished himself at the Siege of Gaeta (1860) and won the knight's cross (croce di cavaliere) of the Order of Saints Maurice and Lazarus.

== North American voyage ==
After the second war, Faà di Bruno was promoted to the rank of frigate captain and given command of the steam corvette San Giovanni. On 23 February 1863, he departed from Genoa for Philadelphia, Pennsylvania, arriving on 20 May. There he inspected the ironclad Re d'Italia, then under construction for the Italian navy. He then steamed to New Orleans, where he unsuccessfully attempted to make his way up the shallow first stretch of the Mississippi River. He then steamed north to Canada, where the San Giovanni became the first Italian ship to enter Baffin Bay, and then turned south again and made his way to Rio de Janeiro, where he stayed several months giving support to the Italian community.

In 1865, Faà di Bruno was given command of the steam corvette Castelfidardo and began working with Admiral Giovanni Vacca in developing the navy into a world-class force. He was sent to Tunisia, where Admiral Albini had already stationed Italian forces, because trade disputes involving the European powers had sparked local unrest. He negotiated a compromise between Italian and Tunisian fishermen, earning himself a decoration from the Bey of Tunis, Muhammad III as-Sadiq.

== Third War of Independence ==
The Sea Battle of Lissa, oil on canvas, by Carl Frederik Sørensen (1868), depicting the sinking of the Re d'Italia. Now in the Heeresgeschichtliches Museum.

Faà di Bruno was promoted to captain and was ordered to take command of the Re d'Italia, which he had inspected in the United States. In May 1866, at the start of the Third Italian War of Independence, he was ordered to join the fleet under Admiral Carlo Pellion di Persano at Taranto, from where they proceeded to Ancona. During the journey the Re d'Italia suffered a minor fire in the coal bunkers.

On 20 July, while some of the fleet was bombarding the forts of Lissa, Admiral di Persano, with his flag aboard the Re d'Italia, sailed to meet the Austrian fleet under Wilhelm von Tegetthoff, transferring his flag to the Affondatore before the beginning of the battle. The Italian line faltered, and the centre—the Re d'Italia with Palestro and San Martino under Faà di Bruno—was isolated. First, the rudder of the Re d'Italia was hit, immobilising it; second, the SMS Erzherzog Ferdinand Max rammed her, punching an 18-foot hole in her side below the waterline. Having struck her colours, she sunk within minutes, with the loss of most of her crew. According to some reports, Faà di Bruno shot himself on the bridge before going down. The majority of historians are more inclined to accept the story of Commander Andrea del Santo, the deputy chief of staff to Persano, who recalled that Faà di Bruno jumped into the sea but was dragged under by the sinking ship. Some historians have accused Faà di Bruno of being a poor seaman, although an able fighter. Although the greatest blame for the loss at Lissa falls on Persano, it was Faà di Bruno who decided, upon sighting an enemy bow, to reverse course, losing headway and being caught almost at a standstill by the ramming Ferdinand Max.

On 15 August 1867, the Italian government awarded Faà di Bruno a Gold Medal of Military Valour, with the citation: "For his conduct in the naval operations at Lissa on the days of 18, 19 and 20 July 1866". Three vessels have been named after him:

- Italian gunboat Faà di Bruno (1896)
- Italian monitor Faà di Bruno (1917)
- Italian submarine Comandante Faà di Bruno (1936)
