= Faà di Bruno =

Coat of arms of Faà di Bruno family

The Faà di Bruno family is the name of an Italian noble family based in the areas of Asti, Casale, and Alessandria, which provided the Counts (later Marquises) of Bruno. In 1703 the family became additionally counts of Carentino.

== History ==
The family arrived in Casale from Vignale around 1500, in the person of Tommaso Faà, who was secretary to the Senate of Monferrato. The brothers Ardicino and Ortensio acquired the castle of Bruno, near Acqui, and were made joint-lords (consignori) of Bruno. Subsequently, prominent members included:

- Giovanni Matteo Faà di Bruno a musician of some importance from Casale who published two books of madrigals as well as vespers, psalms, motets and settings of the Magnificat. He was invested as first Count of Bruno in 1588.
- Camilla Faà di Bruno, (c.1599–1662), a society beauty who was married secretly, briefly and morganatically to Ferdinando I the Gonzaga Duke of Mantua and Monferrato; her memoirs have been described as the first prose autobiography written by an Italian woman.
- Ferdinando Faà di Bruno became the first Marquis of Bruno when the county was elevated into a marquisate on 31 March 1652.
- Ortensio Faà di Bruno (fl. 1686) was priest in Carentino.
- Antonino Faà de' marchesi di Bruno, conte di Carentino (1762–10 November 1829), Bishop of Asti.
- Alessandro Faà di Bruno (1809–1891), a member of the Accademia di Agricoltura di Torino he was an innovator in the field of agriculture. His estate was one of the largest in the areas of Alessandria and Acqui and he experimented with growing the North-American saagaban as a potato substitute crop.
- Emilio Faà di Bruno (1820–1866), officer of the Regia Marina; as commander of the ironclad frigate "Re D'Italia" he fell at the Battle of Lissa during the Third Italian War of Independence.
- The Blessed Francesco Faà di Bruno (1825–1888), brother of Emilio, was a mathematician and priest. He is best known for Faà di Bruno's formula.
- Antonino Faà di Bruno (1910–1981), an actor who appeared in films by Pasolini (Pigsty), Fellini (Amarcord) and Comencini (La donna della domenica).

== Notes and references ==
- Scrivanti Franco, Bruno, www.ilmonferrato.info. (in Italian)
