= SMS Erzherzog Ferdinand Max =

SMS Erzherzog Ferdinand Max is the name of the following ships of the Austrian Navy:

- SMS Erzherzog Ferdinand Max (1865), lead Erzherzog Ferdinand Max-class ironclad, scrapped in 1916
- SMS Erzherzog Ferdinand Max (1905), a Erzherzog Karl-class battleship, scrapped in 1921

== See also ==
- Erzherzog Ferdinand Max
