= Re d'Italia =

Re d'Italia ("King of Italy") may refer to:

- Italian ironclad Re d'Italia, an ironclad launched in 1863 and sunk at the Battle of Lissa in 1866
- SS Re d'Italia, an ocean liner launched in 1906 and scrapped in 1929.
