= Borgoratto =

Borgoratto may refer to 2 Italian municipalities:

- Borgoratto Alessandrino, in the Province of Alessandria, Piedmont
- Borgoratto Mormorolo, in the Province of Pavia, Lombardy
