= Gamalero =

- Comune
- Comune di Gamalero
- Coat of arms

- Location within Italy Location within Piedmont
- Coordinates: 44°49′N 8°32′E
- Country: Italy
- Region: Piedmont
- Province: Alessandria (AL)
- Frazioni: San Rocco

Government
  - Mayor: Nadia Taverna

Area
  - Total: 12.2 km^{2} (4.7 sq mi)
- Elevation: 142 m (466 ft)

Population (2005)
  - Total: 804
  - Density: 65.9/km^{2} (171/sq mi)
- Demonym: Gamaleresi
- Time zone: UTC+1 (CET)
  - Summer (DST): UTC+2 (CEST)
- Postal code: 15010
- Dialing code: 0131
- Website: Official website

Gamalero (Gamaleri in Piedmontese) is a comune (municipality) in the Province of Alessandria in the Italian region Piedmont, located about 70 kilometres (43 mi) southeast of Turin and about 13 kilometres (8 mi) southwest of Alessandria.

Gamalero borders the following municipalities: Carentino, Cassine, Castellazzo Bormida, Castelspina, Frascaro, Mombaruzzo, and Sezzadio.
