= Castelnuovo Belbo =

- Comune
- Comune di Castelnuovo Belbo
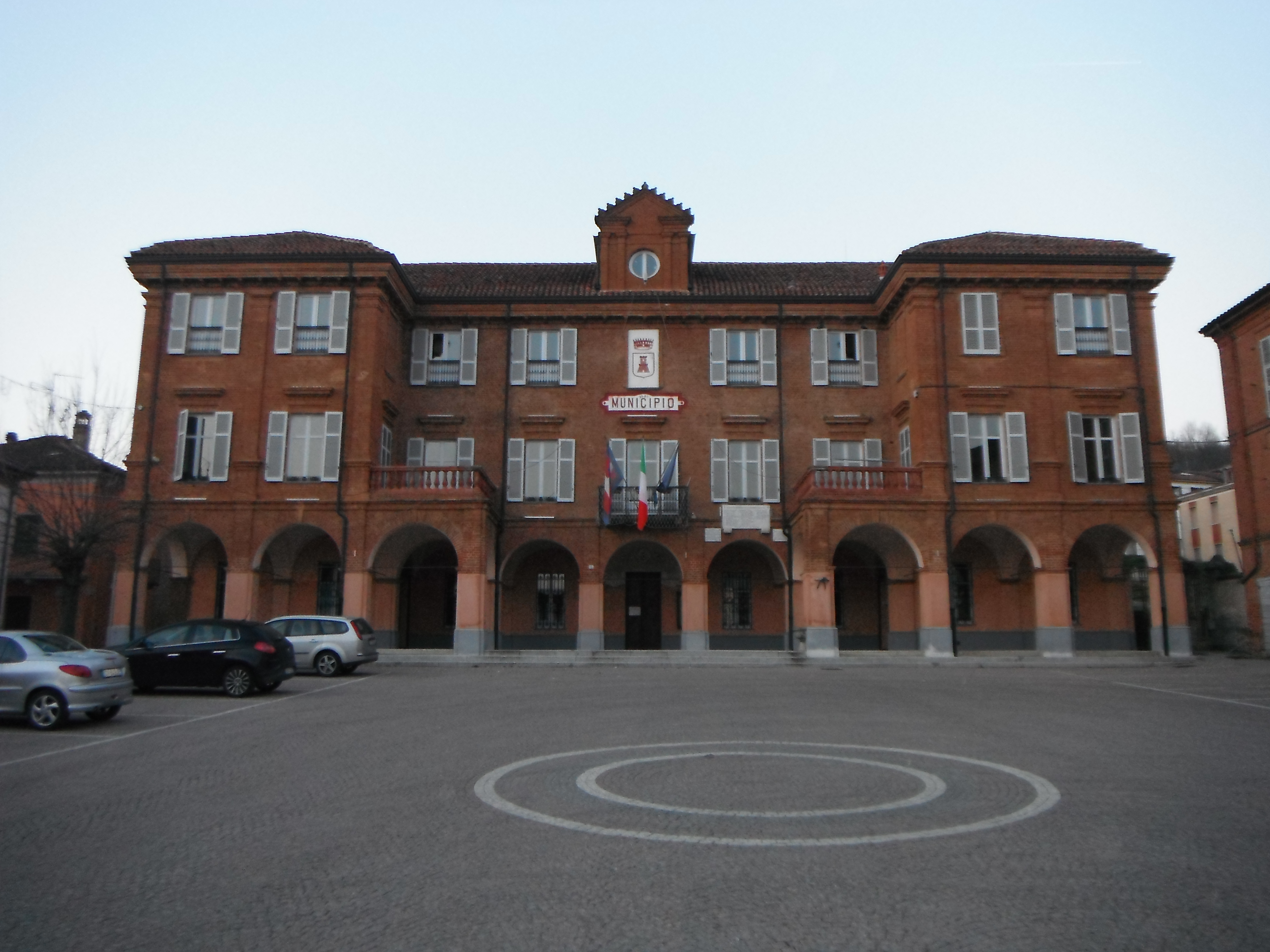
- Town hall, Castelnuovo Belbo

- Coat of arms

- Location within Italy Location within Piedmont
- Coordinates: 44°48′N 8°25′E
- Country: Italy
- Region: Piedmont
- Province: Asti (AT)
- Frazioni: Gallinara

Government
  - Mayor: Francesco Nicola Garino

Area
  - Total: 9.4 km^{2} (3.6 sq mi)
- Elevation: 122 m (400 ft)

Population (1 January 2011)
  - Total: 913
  - Density: 97/km^{2} (250/sq mi)
- Demonym: Castelnovesi
- Time zone: UTC+1 (CET)
  - Summer (DST): UTC+2 (CEST)
- Postal code: 14043
- Dialing code: 0141

Castelnuovo Belbo (Piedmontese: Castelneuv Belb) is a comune (municipality) in the Province of Asti in the Italian region Piedmont, located about 60 kilometres (37 mi) southeast of Turin and about 20 kilometres (12 mi) southeast of Asti.

Castelnuovo Belbo borders the following municipalities: Bergamasco, Bruno, Incisa Scapaccino, Mombaruzzo, and Nizza Monferrato.

== Twin towns ==
- Diémoz, France
