= Erzherzog Ferdinand Max-class ironclad =

Ironclad warship class of the Austro-Hungarian Navy

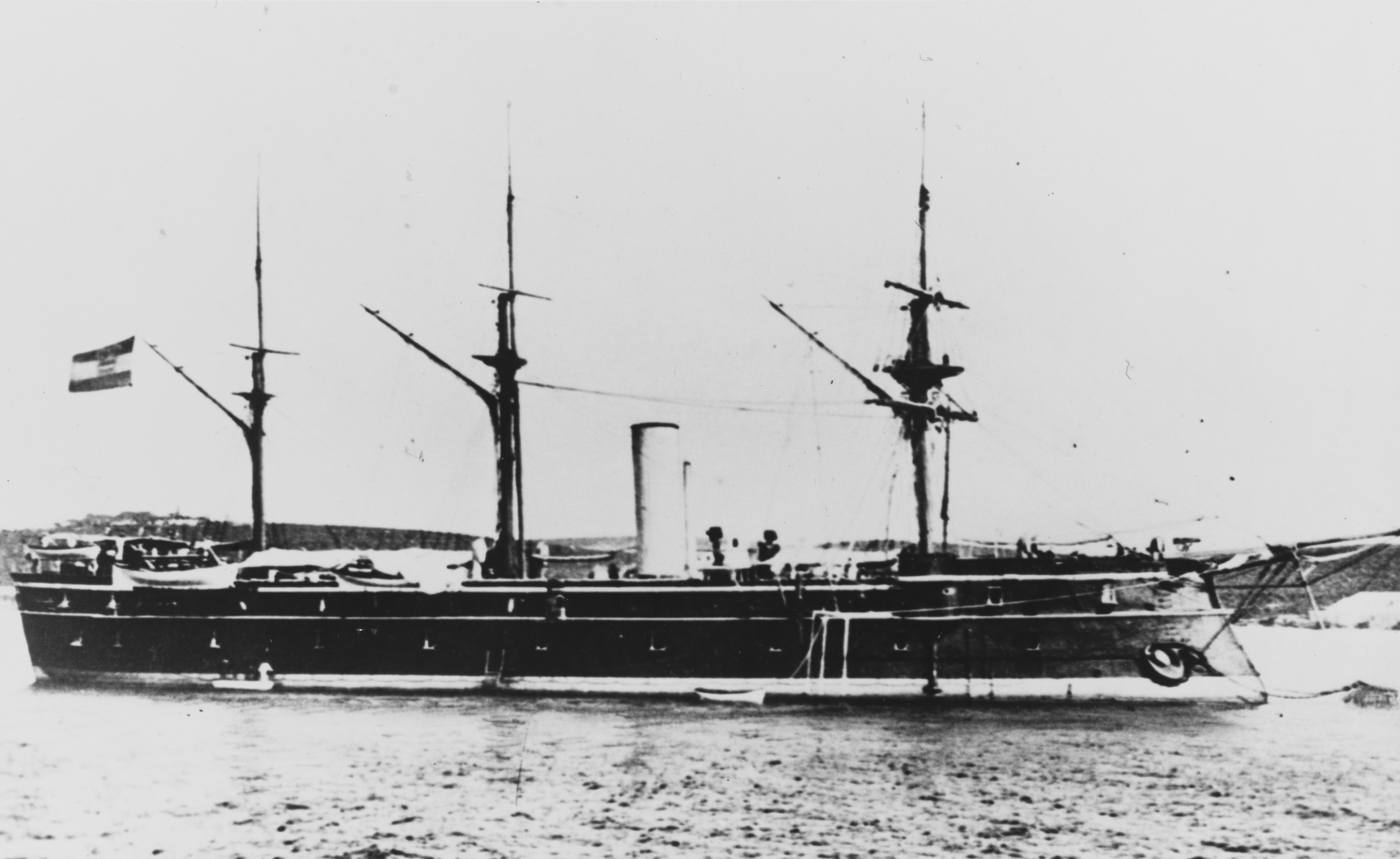
- Erzherzog Ferdinand Max in the 1880s

Class overview
- Operators: Austro-Hungarian Navy
- Preceded by: Kaiser Max class
- Succeeded by: SMS Lissa
- Built: 1863–1866
- In commission: 1866–1898
- Completed: 2
- Scrapped: 2

General characteristics
- Type: Ironclad warship
- Displacement: 5,130 long tons (5,210 t)
- Length: 83.75 meters (274 ft 9 in) oa
- Beam: 15.96 m (52 ft 4 in)
- Draft: 7.14 m (23 ft 5 in)
- Installed power: 2,925 indicated horsepower (2,181 kW)
- Propulsion: 1 × marine steam engine; 1 × screw propeller
- Speed: 12.54 knots (23.22 km/h; 14.43 mph)
- Crew: 511
- Armament: 16 × 48-pounder guns; 4 × 8-pounder guns; 2 × 3-pounder guns
- Armor: Battery: 123 mm (5 in); Ends: 87 mm (3.4 in)

The Erzherzog Ferdinand Max class consisted of a pair of ironclad warships—Erzherzog Ferdinand Max and Habsburg—built for the Austrian Navy in the 1860s. They were the last broadside armored frigates to be built for the Austrian Empire, and the last vessels completed to see action against the Italians at the Battle of Lissa in 1866. Intended to have been armed with new breech-loading Krupp guns, the outbreak of the Seven Weeks' War prevented the delivery of the guns, forcing the Austrian Navy to arm the ships with a battery of sixteen older 48-pounder muzzle-loading guns.

Hastily finished after the war started, both ships saw action at the Battle of Lissa in July. There, Erzherzog Ferdinand Max served as the flagship of Rear Admiral Wilhelm von Tegetthoff; in the course of the melee, the ship rammed and sank the Italian ironclad Re d'Italia, which proved to be the decisive action in the battle. After the war, both ships were laid up and did not see much significant activity for the remainder of their careers owing to reduced naval funding in what had become the Austro-Hungarian Empire. The ships were converted for secondary duties in 1886, Erzherzog Ferdinand Max and Habsburg became a tender and a guard ship, respectively. Habsburg was sold for scrap in 1898, but Erzherzog Ferdinand Max lingered on until 1916, when she joined her sister in the breaker's yard.

== Design ==
Following the launch of the French Gloire, the first ironclad warship, the Austrian Navy began a major ironclad construction program under the direction of Archduke Ferdinand Max, the Marinekommandant (naval commander) and brother of Kaiser Franz Josef I. Ferdinand Max envisioned an ironclad fleet of nine ships, which would be powerful enough to both defeat the fleet of the recently unified Kingdom of Italy, and to make Austria an attractive ally to Britain. In late 1860 and 1861, the first five ships—two Drache and three Kaiser Max-class ironclads—were ordered in response to Italian ironclad orders; the Austro-Italian ironclad arms race had begun.

The construction of the Drache and Kaiser Max classes prompted the Austrian government to convene a commission in early 1862 to study future naval development, and crucially, the question of whether the navy should be oriented toward power projection from the Adriatic or purely defensive of the Austrian Littoral. The commission had deadlocked by April, but the recent Battle of Hampton Roads in the American Civil War—the first engagement between two ironclads—had demonstrated the ascendancy of the new ships and convinced the Reichsrat (Imperial Council) to grant a significant increase for the naval budget, which allowed two new ironclads to be ordered in 1863, which became the Erzherzog Ferdinand Max class.

All of these ships were designed by the Director of Naval Construction Josef von Romako, who also prepared the design for what became the Erzherzog Ferdinand Max class, named for the Marinekommandant. These two ships were significantly larger than the Drache and Kaiser Max-class vessels, and were originally intended to carry thirty-two 48-pounder muzzle-loading guns, though during the construction process the Navy decided to opt for a battery of new breech-loading guns manufactured by Krupp. The outbreak of the Seven Weeks' War in 1866 forced the Navy to hastily complete them with only sixteen of the original 48-pounders. They also did not initially receive their sailing rig.

=== General characteristics and machinery ===
Line-drawing of Erzherzog Ferdinand Max

The Erzherzog Ferdinand Max-class ships had a similar appearance to the French Gloire. The Austrian vessels were 79.97 meters (262 ft 4 in) long between perpendiculars and 83.75 m (274 ft 9 in) long overall. They had a beam of 15.96 m (52 ft 4 in) and an average draft of 7.14 m (23 ft 5 in). They displaced 5,130 long tons (5,210 t). The hulls were of wooden construction, and were sheathed with wrought iron armor that was 123 mm (5 in) thick on the battery and reduced to 87 mm (3.4 in) at the bow and stern. The ships had a crew of 511 officers and enlisted men.

Their propulsion system consisted of one single-expansion, 2-cylinder, horizontal steam engine that was manufactured by the Stabilimento Tecnico shipyard in Fiume. The engine drove a single screw propeller. The number and type of their coal-fired boilers have not survived, though they were trunked into a single funnel located amidships. Their engines produced a top speed of 12.54 knots (23.22 km/h; 14.43 mph) from 2,925 indicated horsepower (2,181 kW). Coal storage amounted to 330 long tons (340 t). Each ship was fitted with a three-masted rig to supplement the steam engines, but the rushed nature of their completion delayed the installation of the rigging until 1867.

=== Armament ===
The ships of the Erzherzog Ferdinand Max class were broadside ironclads, and they were armed with a main battery of sixteen 48-pounder muzzle-loading guns. These were carried in the traditional broadside arrangement of earlier ships of the line. They also carried several smaller guns, including four 8-pounder guns and two 3-pounders. Over the course of their career, their armament was revised several times. The old muzzle-loaders were replaced with a battery of fourteen 8 in (203 mm) Krupp guns in 1869. In 1874 they were rearmed with a battery of fourteen 7 in (178 mm) muzzle-loading Armstrong guns and four light guns. Their battery was revised again in 1882, with the addition of four 9 cm (3.5 in) breech-loader guns, two 7 cm (2.8 in) breech-loaders, a pair of 47 mm (1.9 in) quick-firing revolver guns, and three 25 mm (0.98 in) auto-cannons.

== Ships ==
Name	Builder	Laid down	Launched	Completed
Erzherzog Ferdinand Max	Stabilimento Tecnico Triestino, Trieste	6 May 1863	24 May 1865	July 1866
Habsburg	Stabilimento Tecnico Triestino, Trieste	June 1863	26 June 1865	July 1866

== Service history ==
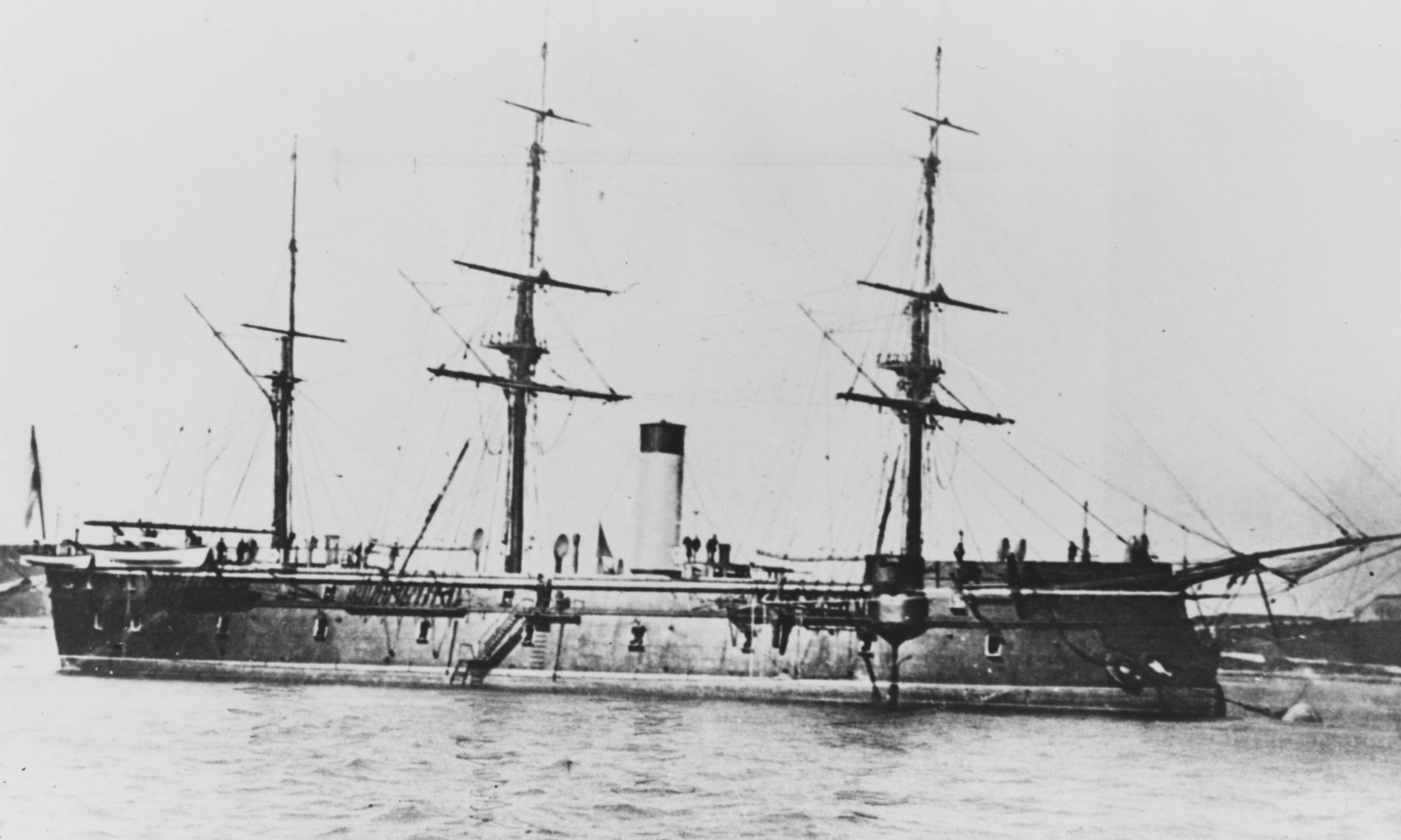
Habsburg after her modernization in the 1880s

Both ships were still under construction at the outbreak of the Seven Weeks' War in June 1866; the shipyard workers quickly completed the vessels, albeit with old smooth-bore guns instead of the Krupp rifled breech-loaders that were intended. Erzherzog Ferdinand Max served as the flagship of the Austrian fleet under Rear Admiral Wilhelm von Tegetthoff. The two ships saw action at the Battle of Lissa in July 1866, where Erzherzog Ferdinand Max rammed and sank the Italian ironclad Re d'Italia. This proved to be the turning point of the engagement, forcing the Italian commander, Admiral Carlo Pellion di Persano to withdraw. Habsburg, however, was not seriously engaged during the battle. Neither ship received significant damage in the battle, and they spent the rest of the war patrolling the Adriatic against a possible sortie from the Italian fleet. After the war, the ships were disarmed and laid up.

The ships remained in the Austro-Hungarian fleet for the next twenty years, but severely reduced naval budgets owing to Hungarian disinterest in naval matters led to an uneventful career. In 1870, Habsburg was used in a show of force to try to prevent the Italian annexation of Rome while the city's protector, France, was distracted with the Franco-Prussian War, though the Italians took the city regardless. They were rearmed with newer guns in 1874 and again in 1882. Both ships were converted for secondary duties in 1886, Erzherzog Ferdinand Max becoming a tender to the gunnery training school from 1889 to 1908, while Habsburg was employed as a guard ship and a barracks ship in Pola until 1898, when she was stricken from the naval register and sold for scrap. Erzherzog Ferdinand Max remained in the inventory until 1916 when she too was broken up for scrap.
