= Castellazzo Bormida =

- Comune
- Comune di Castellazzo Bormida
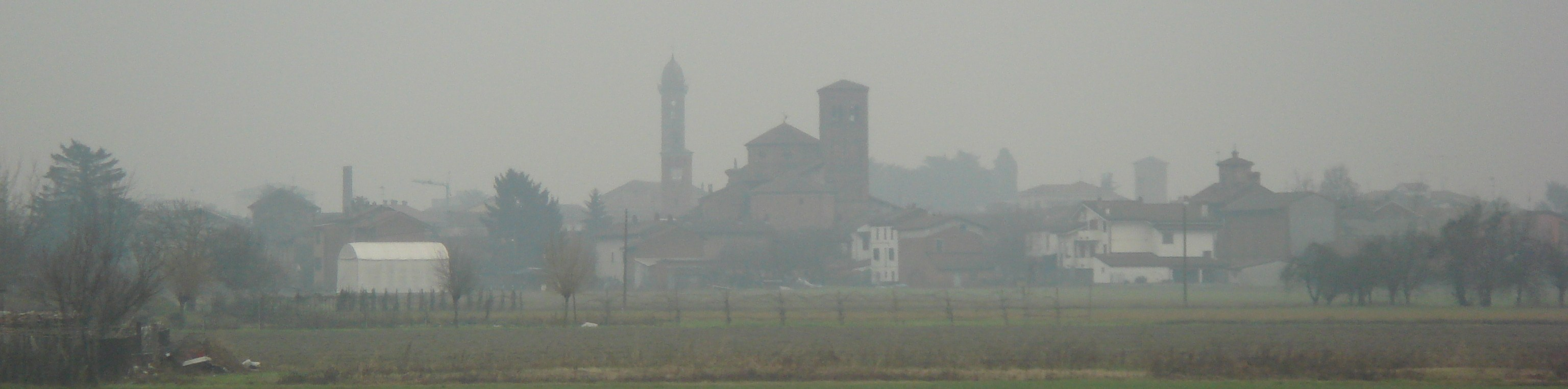

- Location within Italy Location within Piedmont
- Coordinates: 44°50′42″N 8°34′39″E
- Country: Italy
- Region: Piedmont
- Province: Alessandria (AL)
- Frazioni: Fontanasse

Area
  - Total: 45.13 km^{2} (17.42 sq mi)
- Elevation: 104 m (341 ft)

Population (31 August 2017)
  - Total: 4,526
  - Density: 100.3/km^{2} (259.7/sq mi)
- Demonym: Castellazzesi
- Time zone: UTC+1 (CET)
  - Summer (DST): UTC+2 (CEST)
- Postal code: 15073
- Dialing code: 0131
- Website: Official website

Castellazzo Bormida (Ël Castlass in Piedmontese, and Castlass an Burmia or Castlas an Burmia locally) is a comune (municipality) in the Province of Alessandria in the Italian region Piedmont, located about 70 kilometres (43 mi) southeast of Turin and about 8 kilometres (5 mi) southwest of Alessandria.

Castellazzo Bormida borders the following municipalities: Alessandria, Borgoratto Alessandrino, Casal Cermelli, Castelspina, Frascaro, Frugarolo, Gamalero, Oviglio, and Predosa.
