= Frascaro =

- Comune
- Comune di Frascaro
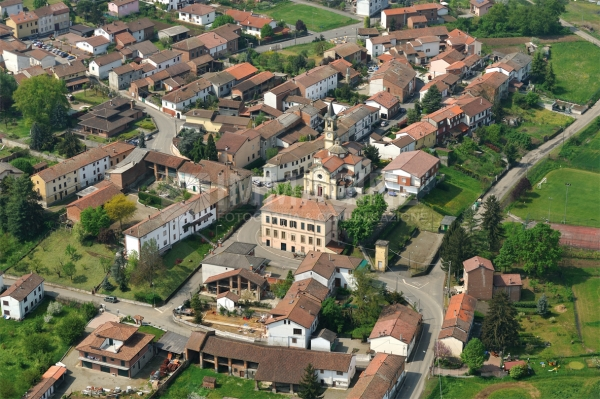

- Location within Italy Location within Piedmont
- Coordinates: 44°50′N 8°32′E
- Country: Italy
- Region: Piedmont
- Province: Alessandria (AL)

Government
  - Mayor: Pietro Ciberti

Area
  - Total: 5.29 km^{2} (2.04 sq mi)
- Elevation: 124 m (407 ft)

Population (31 August 2017)
  - Total: 433
  - Density: 81.9/km^{2} (212/sq mi)
- Demonym: Frascaresi
- Time zone: UTC+1 (CET)
  - Summer (DST): UTC+2 (CEST)
- Postal code: 15010
- Dialing code: 0131
- Website: Official website

Frascaro is a comune (municipality) in the Province of Alessandria in the Italian region Piedmont, located about 70 kilometres (43 mi) southeast of Turin and about 11 kilometres (7 mi) southwest of Alessandria.

Frascaro borders the following municipalities: Borgoratto Alessandrino, Carentino, Castellazzo Bormida, Gamalero, and Mombaruzzo.
