= Giovanni Matteo Faà di Bruno =

Italian composer

Giovanni Matteo Faà di Bruno (fl. c. 1570, also Horatio or Orazio di Faà) was an Italian composer and nobleman.

== Biography ==
Giovanni Matteo Faà di Bruno was a member of the Faà di Bruno family in the Casale Monferrato region. A musician of some importance in his lifetime, he composed a limited number of sacred and secular works, most notably two books of madrigals and a set of vespers. His affiliation with the ducal family of the Gonzagas is evident in the dedicatory prefaces to his books of madrigals; the first dedicated to Guglielmo Gonzaga and the second to his son and heir to the ducal throne Vincenzo.

Andrea Botta, maestro di cappella of the cathedral at Casale, who compiled the second edition of the first book, mentions in its preface a publication of Faà's Vespers (now thought to be Salmi di David (1573)); besides a setting of the vespers, it contains several motets (for as many as eight voices), as well as a setting of the Magnificat..
