= Bergamasco, Piedmont =

Bergamasco
- Comune
- Comune di Bergamasco
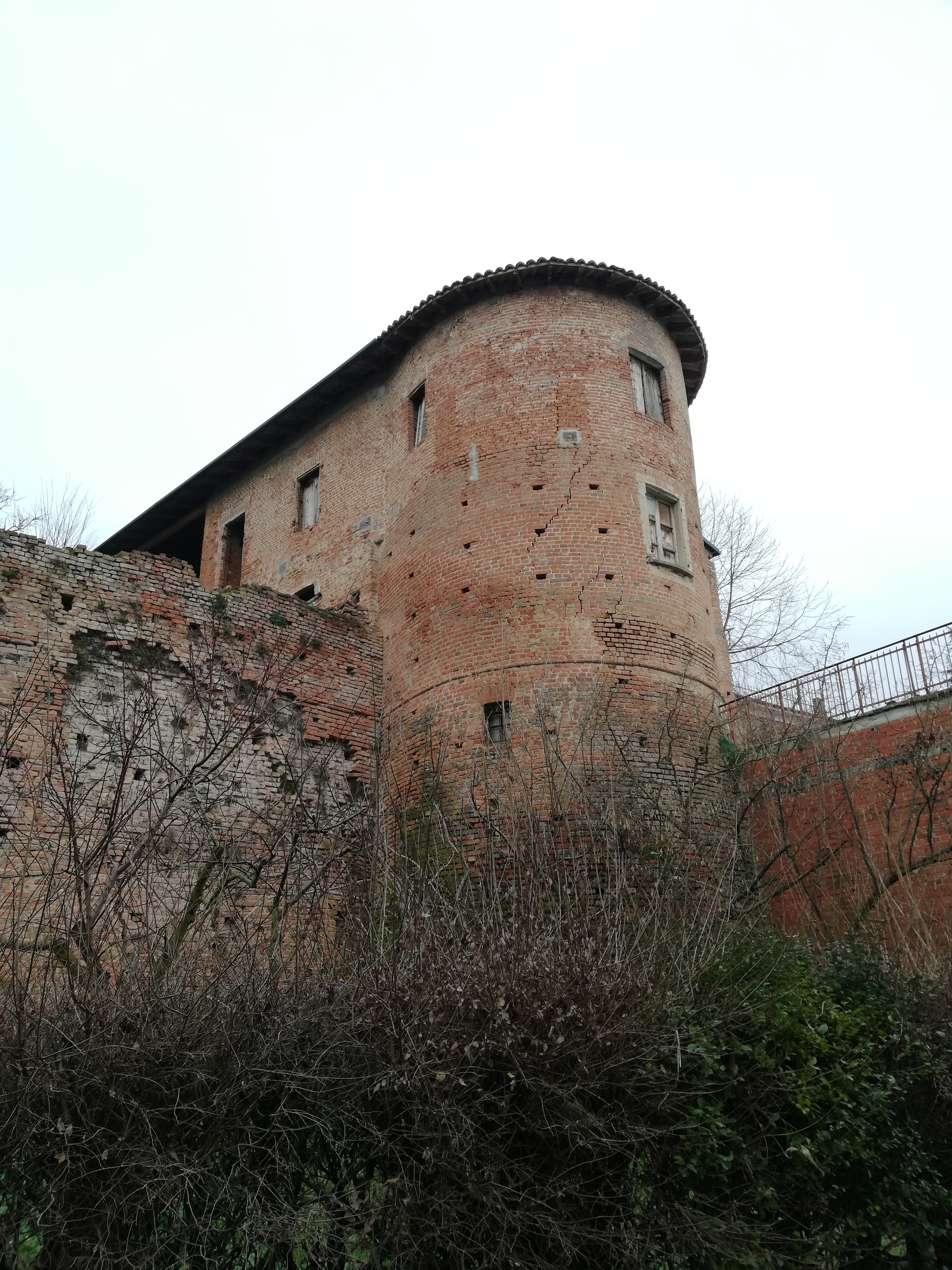

- Coat of arms

- Location within Italy Location within Piedmont
- Coordinates: 44°49′N 8°27′E
- Country: Italy
- Region: Piedmont
- Province: Alessandria (AL)

Government
  - Mayor: Giulio Veeggi

Area
  - Total: 13.44 km^{2} (5.19 sq mi)
- Elevation: 125 m (410 ft)

Population (30 April 2017)
  - Total: 732
  - Density: 54.5/km^{2} (141/sq mi)
- Demonym: Bergamaschesi
- Time zone: UTC+1 (CET)
  - Summer (DST): UTC+2 (CEST)
- Postal code: 15022
- Dialing code: 0131
- Patron saint: Saint James the Greater and Nativity of Mary
- Saint day: July 25 and September 8
- Website: Official website

Bergamasco is a comune (municipality) in the Province of Alessandria in the Italian region Piedmont, located about 70 kilometres (43 mi) southeast of Turin and about 15 kilometres (9 mi) southwest of Alessandria.

It is located between the hills of Montferrat and the Po Valley. This village is washed by the river Belbo.

From 1000 to 1514, Bergamasco was owned by the Marchesi of Incisa Scapaccino. Then William IX Palaiologos, the marchese of Montferrat, caught and destroyed it. So it followed Montferrat's destiny.

In 1944, during World War II, the town was part of the partisan Republic of Alto Monferrato. It was also one of the towns targeted in Operation Koblenz-Süd.

Bergamasco borders the following municipalities: Bruno, Carentino, Castelnuovo Belbo, Incisa Scapaccino, and Oviglio.
