= Mombaruzzo =

- Comune
- Comune di Mombaruzzo
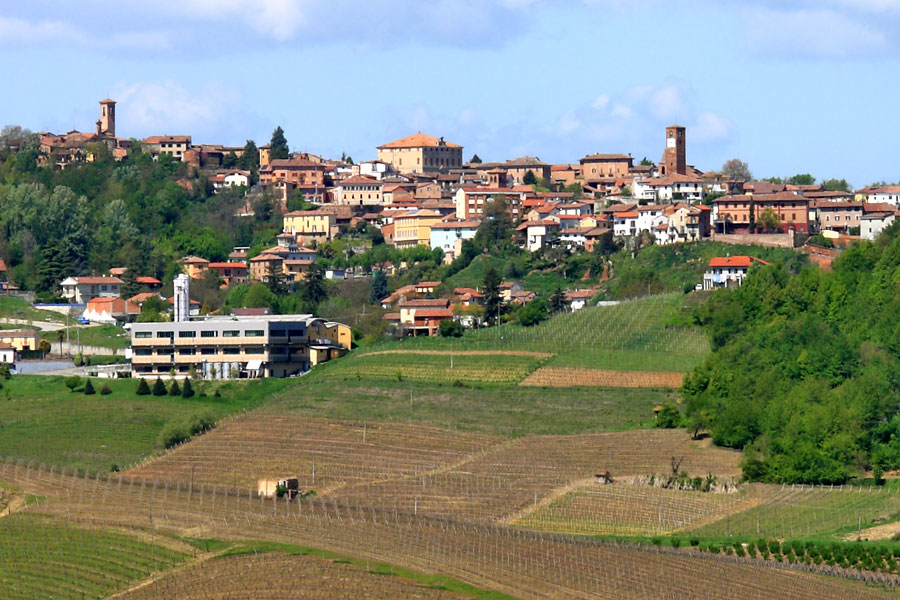
- View of Mombaruzzo

- Coat of arms

- Location within Italy Location within Piedmont
- Coordinates: 44°46′N 8°27′E
- Country: Italy
- Region: Piedmont
- Province: Asti (AT)

Government
  - Mayor: Giovanni Domenico Giuseppe Spandonaro

Area
  - Total: 22.1 km^{2} (8.5 sq mi)
- Elevation: 275 m (902 ft)

Population (31 December 2019)
  - Total: 1,028
  - Density: 46.5/km^{2} (120/sq mi)
- Demonym: Mobaruzzesi
- Time zone: UTC+1 (CET)
  - Summer (DST): UTC+2 (CEST)
- Postal code: 14046
- Dialing code: 0141
- Website: Official website

Mombaruzzo is a comune (municipality) in the Province of Asti in the Italian region Piedmont, located about 70 kilometres (43 mi) southeast of Turin and about 25 kilometres (16 mi) southeast of Asti.

Mombaruzzo borders the following municipalities: Bruno, Carentino, Cassine, Castelnuovo Belbo, Fontanile, Frascaro, Gamalero, Maranzana, Nizza Monferrato, Quaranti, and Ricaldone.

Mombaruzzo is known for the "Amaretti of Mombaruzzo".
