= Giovanni Canestri =

Italian Catholic cardinal

His Eminence Giovanni Canestri
- Cardinal, Archbishop of Genoa
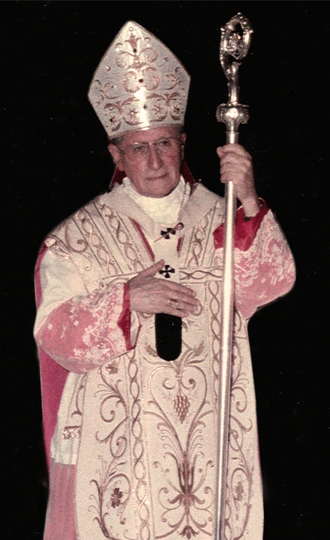
- Archdiocese: Genoa
- Appointed: 6 July 1987
- Term ended: 20 April 1995
- Predecessor: Giuseppe Siri
- Successor: Dionigi Tettamanzi
- Other post: Cardinal-Priest of Sant’Andrea della Valle
- Previous posts: Archbishop of Cagliari (1984–1987); Titular Archbishop of Forum Clodii (1975–1984); Vicegerent of Rome (1975–1984); Bishop of Tortona (1971–1975); Titular Bishop of Tenedus (1961–1971); Auxiliary Bishop of Rome (1961–1971)

Orders
- Ordination: 12 April 1941 by Luigi Traglia
- Consecration: 30 July 1961 by Luigi Traglia
- Created cardinal: 28 June 1988 by Pope John Paul II
- Rank: Cardinal-Priest

Personal details
- Born: Giovanni Canestri; 30 September 1918 Castelspina, Piedmont, Kingdom of Italy
- Died: 29 April 2015 (aged 96) Rome, Italy
- Denomination: Roman Catholic
- Motto: Opus Tuum Nos O Maria
- Coat of arms

Styles of Giovanni Canestri
- Reference style: His Eminence
- Spoken style: Your Eminence
- Informal style: Cardinal

Giovanni Canestri (30 September 1918 – 29 April 2015) was an Italian Catholic cardinal, who served as Archbishop of Cagliari from 1984 until 1987 and as Archbishop of Genoa from 1987 until 1995.

== Life ==
Born in Castelspina, province of Alessandria, he was ordained priest on 12 April 1941.

Canestri studied at the Minor Seminary of Alessandria from 1929 (secondary studies); then, at the Episcopal Seminary of Alessandria, where he obtained the maturità classica. In 1937, he went to Rome to study at the Pontifical Roman Seminary, Rome. Concurrently he studied at the Pontifical Lateran University, Rome, where he obtained a licentiate in theology; and later, a doctorate in utroque iure, both canon law and civil law; and at the Rome State University, where he earned a doctorate in letters. In August 1959, he was nominated spiritual director of the Pontifical Roman Seminary and was member of the commission for the first diocesan synod of Rome. He also served as Apostolic examiner of the clergy.

On 8 July 1961, he was named Titular Bishop of Tenedo, and auxiliary of the Cardinal vicar of Rome. He participated in the general congregations of Vatican II on the themes of ecumenism and religious liberty.

On 7 January 1971, he was transferred to the see of Tortona. On 8 February 1975, he was transferred to the titular see of Monterano, with personal title of archbishop, and appointed vicegerent of the Diocese of Rome. During this time, he was dedicated to the growth and development of the community, defending the values of the human person, especially the value of life.

On 22 March 1984, he was named Archbishop of Cagliari. On 6 July 1987, he was transferred to the metropolitan see of Genoa.

Canestri was made a Cardinal-Priest of Sant'Andrea della Valle by Pope John Paul II in the consistory of 28 June 1988.

He became Archbishop Emeritus of Genoa on 20 April 1995.

His brother Carlo Canestri (1920–2004) was Vicar general of the Roman Catholic Diocese of Alessandria.

Cardinal Canestri died on 29 April 2015. His Funeral Mass was celebrated on Sunday, 2 May 2015, at 8:30 AM, by Angelo Cardinal Sodano, the incumbent Dean of the College of Cardinals, together with other prelates and other Cardinals; Pope Francis presided at the rites of Final Commendation and Valediction. He is buried in the Cathedral of Genoa.

Catholic Church titles
Preceded by Giuseppe Siri	Archbishop of Genoa; 6 July 1987 – 20 April 1995	Succeeded by Dionigi Tettamanzi
