= Oviglio =

Oviglio Ovij / J'Oij (Piedmontese)
- Comune
- Comune di Oviglio
- Location within Italy Location within Piedmont
- Coordinates: 44°52′N 8°29′E
- Country: Italy
- Region: Piedmont
- Province: Province of Alessandria (AL)

Area
  - Total: 27.3 km^{2} (10.5 sq mi)
- Elevation: 107 m (351 ft)

Population (Dec. 2004)
  - Total: 1,248
  - Density: 45.7/km^{2} (118/sq mi)
- Demonym: Ovigliesi
- Time zone: UTC+1 (CET)
  - Summer (DST): UTC+2 (CEST)
- Postal code: 15026
- Dialing code: 0131

Oviglio (Piedmontese: Ovij or J'Oij) is a comune (municipality) in the Province of Alessandria in the Italian region of Piedmont, located about 70 kilometres (43 mi) southeast of Turin and about 12 kilometres (7 mi) southwest of Alessandria. As of 31 December 2004, it had a population of 1,248 and an area of 27.3 square kilometres (10.5 mi^{2}).

Oviglio borders the following municipalities: Alessandria, Bergamasco, Borgoratto Alessandrino, Carentino, Castellazzo Bormida, Felizzano, Incisa Scapaccino, Masio, and Solero.

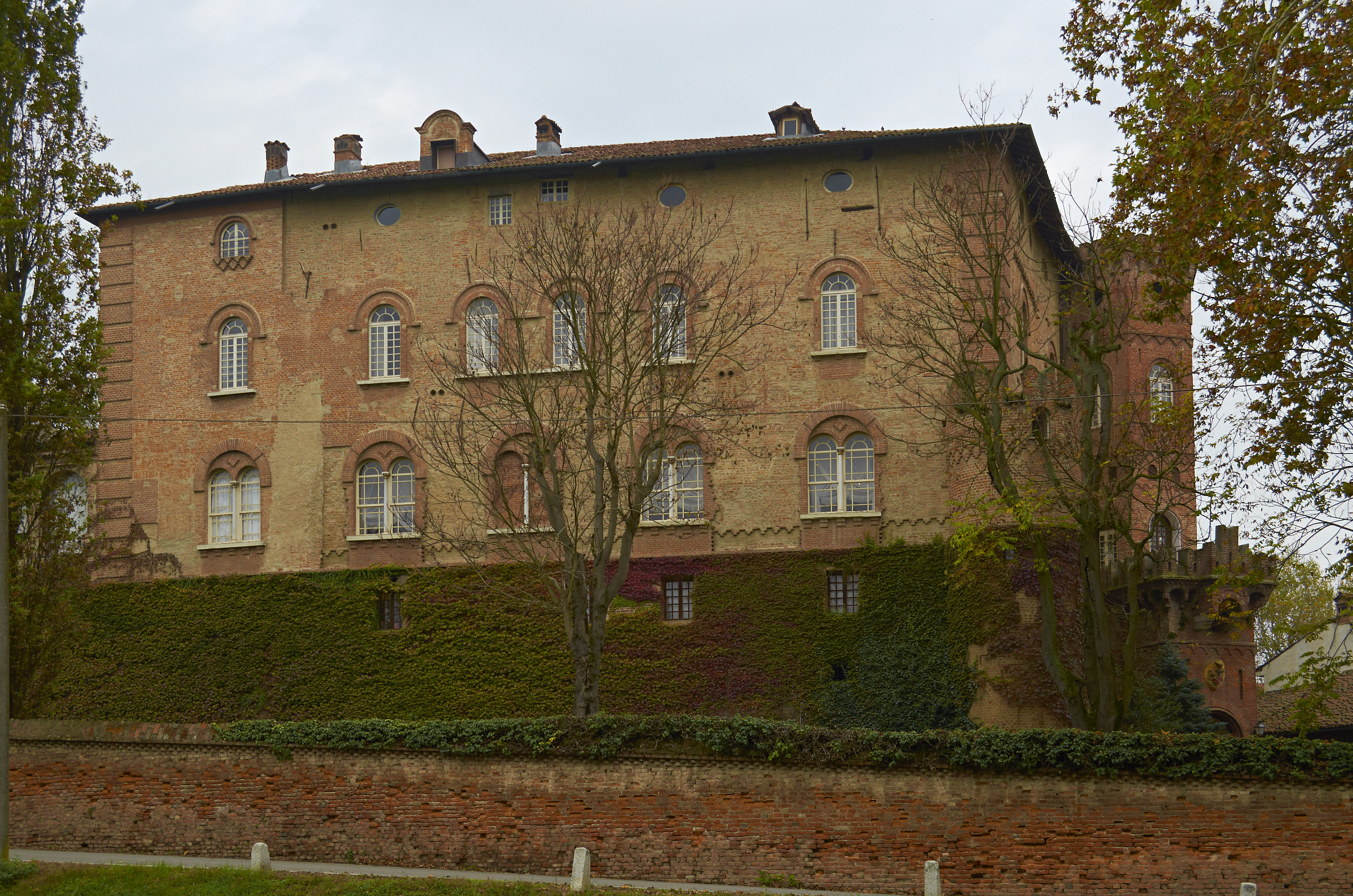
Castello di Oviglio

== Demographic evolution ==
Historical population

Year	Pop.	±%
1861	2,926	—
1871	3,047	+4.1%
1881	3,000	−1.5%
1901	2,803	−6.6%
1911	2,400	−14.4%

Year	Pop.	±%
1921	2,244	−6.5%
1931	1,982	−11.7%
1936	2,024	+2.1%
1951	1,898	−6.2%
1961	1,595	−16.0%

Year	Pop.	±%
1971	1,464	−8.2%
1981	1,343	−8.3%
1991	1,312	−2.3%
2001	1,294	−1.4%

Source: Data from ISTAT
