= Francesco Faà di Bruno =

Italian priest and mathematician (1825–1888)

Blessed Francesco Faà di Bruno
- Born: 7 March 1825; Alessandria, Piedmont, Kingdom of Sardinia
- Died: 25 March 1888 (aged 62); Turin, Savoy, Kingdom of Italy
- Family: Faà di Bruno

Priest, Religious founder and Friend of the Poor
- Venerated in: Roman Catholic Church (Roman Catholic Archdiocese of Turin)
- Beatified: 25 September 1988, Vatican City by Pope John Paul II
- Major shrine: Church of Our Lady of Suffrage, Turin, Italy
- Feast: 27 March
- Scientific career
- Education: University of Paris
- Known for: Elliptic functions; Combinatorics; Invariant theory; Faà di Bruno's formula
- Workplaces: University of Turin
- Thesis: Théorie de l'élimination. Suivi de Développement de la fonction perturbatrice et des coordonnées d'une planète dans son mouvement elliptique (1856)
- Doctoral advisor: Augustin Louis Cauchy
- Notable students: Giuseppe Peano; Corrado Segre

Francesco Faà di Bruno (7 March 1825 – 25 March 1888) was an Italian priest and advocate of the poor, a leading mathematician of his era and a noted religious musician. In 1988 he was beatified by Pope John Paul II. He is the eponym of Faà di Bruno's formula.

== Life ==
=== Early life ===
Faà di Bruno was born in Alessandria, then part of the Kingdom of Sardinia, on 7 March 1825. He was of noble birth, being the twelfth and youngest child of the Marchese Luigi Faà di Bruno and the Lady Carolina Sappa de' Milanesi. He was raised in a home marked by happiness, the arts and a concern for the poor arising from the parents' strong Catholic faith.

As a young man, he entered the Royal Army and held, at one time, the rank of Staff Officer. He resigned from his commission and went to Paris, where he did doctoral studies in mathematics under Augustin Cauchy, and Urbain Le Verrier, who both shared in the discovery of the planet Neptune. He was in close contact with the mathematicians François-Napoléon-Marie Moigno and Charles Hermite.

On his return to Turin, he took up the position of Professor of Mathematics at the local university. In recognition of his achievements as a mathematician, the degree of Doctor of Science was conferred on him by the Universities of Paris and Turin.

=== Social reformer ===
While carrying out his career responsibilities, Faà di Bruno also became actively involved in the social outreach to the poor being developed by leading figures of the Catholic Church in Turin. He became a close friend of John Bosco, and helped establish refuges for the elderly and the poor. He oversaw the construction of a church in Turin, Our Lady of Suffrage.

=== Priest and founder ===
Somewhat late in his life, Faà di Bruno came to feel that pursuing Holy Orders would help him in his religious activities and commenced the necessary studies in theology. What he found, however, was that the Archbishop of Turin at that time would not accept an older man for ordination, Faà di Bruno being in his late 40s at that time. For centuries, the traditional route for this profession began in a boy's mid-teens.

Faà di Bruno appealed to Pope Pius IX and received his support, finally being ordained at age 51. He founded the Minim Sisters of St. Zita in 1881 to provide help for maids and domestic servants, later expanding its outreach to include others, such as unmarried mothers. With their help, he also established another refuge, one dedicated to taking in prostitutes.

Faà di Bruno died in Turin on 25 March 1888.

=== Veneration ===
The cause for the canonization of Faà di Bruno opened in the early 20th century by the Archdiocese of Turin and he was declared a Servant of God. His spiritual writings were approved by theologians on 22 May 1935. He was declared Venerable by Pope Paul VI in 1971, and beatified by Pope John Paul II on the centennial of his death in 1988.

In an address to the Minim Sisters in 2002, Pope John Paul II said, ""Francesco Faà di Bruno", I said, is "a giant of faith and charity", for his message of light and love, "far from being exhausted, seems timelier than ever, urging all those who have Gospel values at heart to action"" (Homily, 25 September, n. 4; ORE, 24 October 1988, p. 15).

== Research in mathematics ==
In addition to some ascetical writings, the composition of some sacred melodies, and the invention of some scientific apparatus, Faà di Bruno made numerous and important contributions to mathematics. Today, he is best known for Faà di Bruno's formula on derivatives of composite functions although it is now certain Louis François Antoine Arbogast had priority for its discovery and use. Faà di Bruno should be credited only for the formula's determinant form. However, his work is mainly related to elimination theory and to the theory of elliptic functions.

He was the author of about 40 original articles published in the "Journal de Mathématiques" (edited by Joseph Liouville), Crelle's Journal, "American Journal of Mathematics" (Johns Hopkins University), "Annali di Tortolini", "Les Mondes", "Comptes rendus de l'Académie des sciences", etc.; the first half of an exhaustive treatise on the theory and applications of elliptic functions which he planned to complete in three volumes; "Théorie générale de l'élimination" (Paris, 1859); "Calcolo degli errori" (Turin, 1867), translated into French under the title of "Traité élémentaire du calcul des erreurs" (Paris, 1869); and most important of all, "Théorie des formes binaires" (Paris, 1876), translated into German (Leipzig, 1881). For a list of the memoirs of Faà di Bruno, see the "Catalogue of Scientific Papers of the Royal Society: (London, 1868, 1877, 1891), t. II, vii, and ix.

Among his students were the noted mathematicians Corrado Segre and Giuseppe Peano.

== See also ==
- List of Roman Catholic scientist-clerics
