= Borgoratto Alessandrino =

- Comune
- Comune di Borgoratto Alessandrino
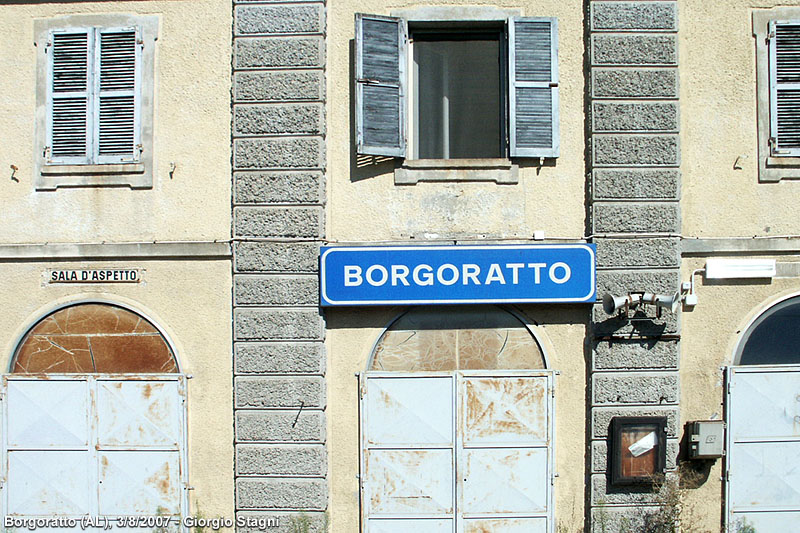

- Coat of arms

- Location within Italy Location within Piedmont
- Coordinates: 44°50′N 8°32′E
- Country: Italy
- Region: Piedmont
- Province: Alessandria (AL)

Government
  - Mayor: Simone Bigotti

Area
  - Total: 6.6 km^{2} (2.5 sq mi)

Population (30 November 2019)
  - Total: 561
  - Density: 85/km^{2} (220/sq mi)
- Time zone: UTC+1 (CET)
  - Summer (DST): UTC+2 (CEST)
- Postal code: 15013
- Dialing code: 0131
- Website: Official website

Borgoratto Alessandrino is a comune (municipality) in the Province of Alessandria in the Italian region of Piedmont, located about 70 kilometres (43 mi) southeast of Turin and about 11 kilometres (7 mi) southwest of Alessandria, on the Bormida river.

It borders the following municipalities: Carentino, Castellazzo Bormida, Frascaro, and Oviglio.
