= Solero, Piedmont =

Solero
- Comune
- Comune di Solero
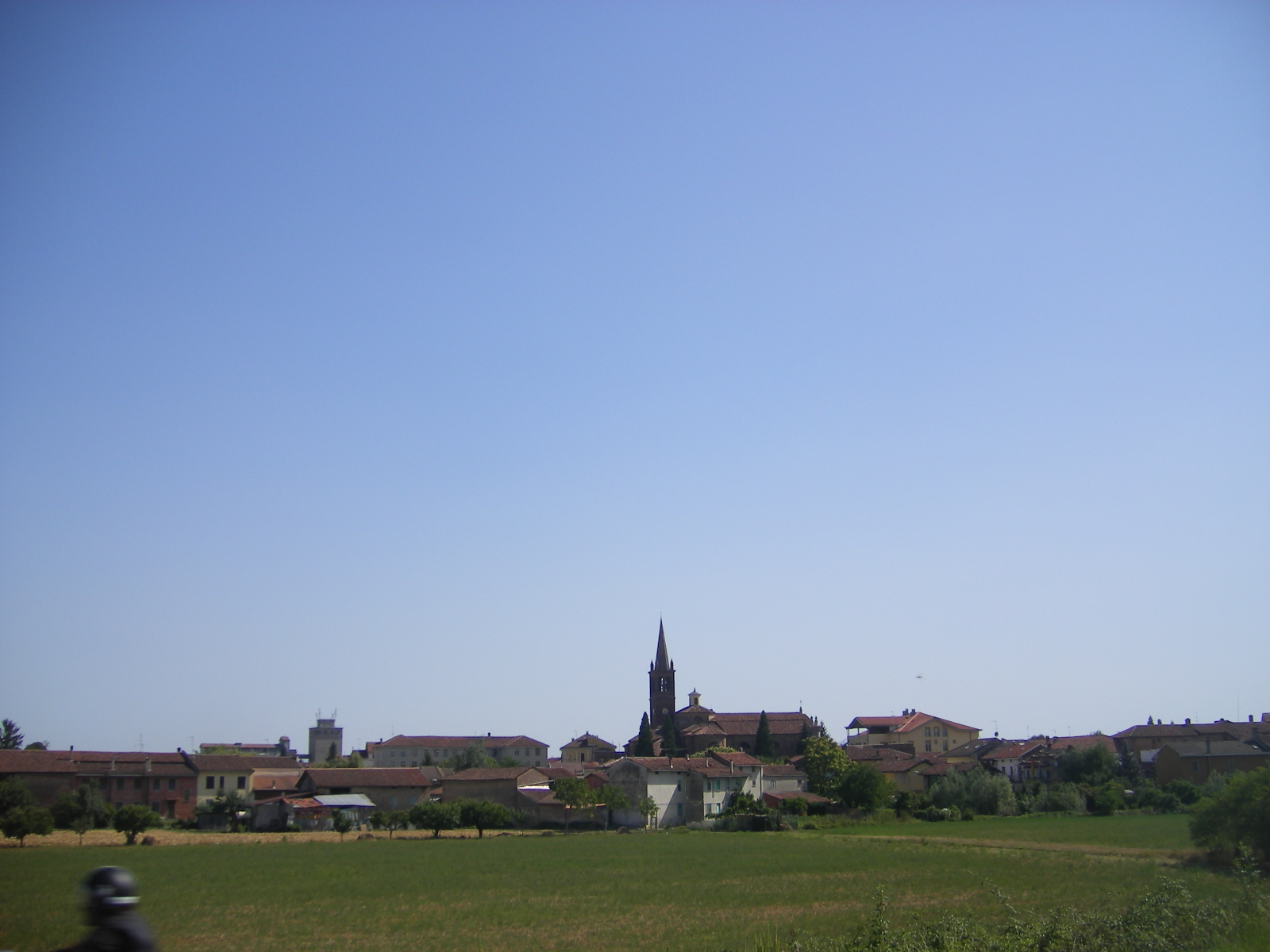

- Coat of arms

- Location within Italy Location within Piedmont
- Coordinates: 44°55′N 8°31′E
- Country: Italy
- Region: Piedmont
- Province: Alessandria (AL)

Government
  - Mayor: Giovanni Ercole

Area
  - Total: 22.7 km^{2} (8.8 sq mi)
- Elevation: 102 m (335 ft)

Population (31 December 2010)
  - Total: 1,709
  - Density: 75.3/km^{2} (195/sq mi)
- Demonym: Solerini
- Time zone: UTC+1 (CET)
  - Summer (DST): UTC+2 (CEST)
- Postal code: 15029
- Dialing code: 0131
- Website: Official website

Solero is a comune (municipality) in the Province of Alessandria in the Italian region Piedmont, located about 70 kilometres (43 mi) east of Turin and about 8 kilometres (5 mi) west of Alessandria. It borders the following municipalities: Alessandria, Felizzano, Oviglio, and Quargnento.

== People ==
Solero was the birthplace of:

- Saint Bruno of Segni (c.1047–1123), bishop of Segni and abbot of Montecassino
- Carlo Guasco (1813–1876) opera singer
