= Carentino =

- Comune
- Comune di Carentino
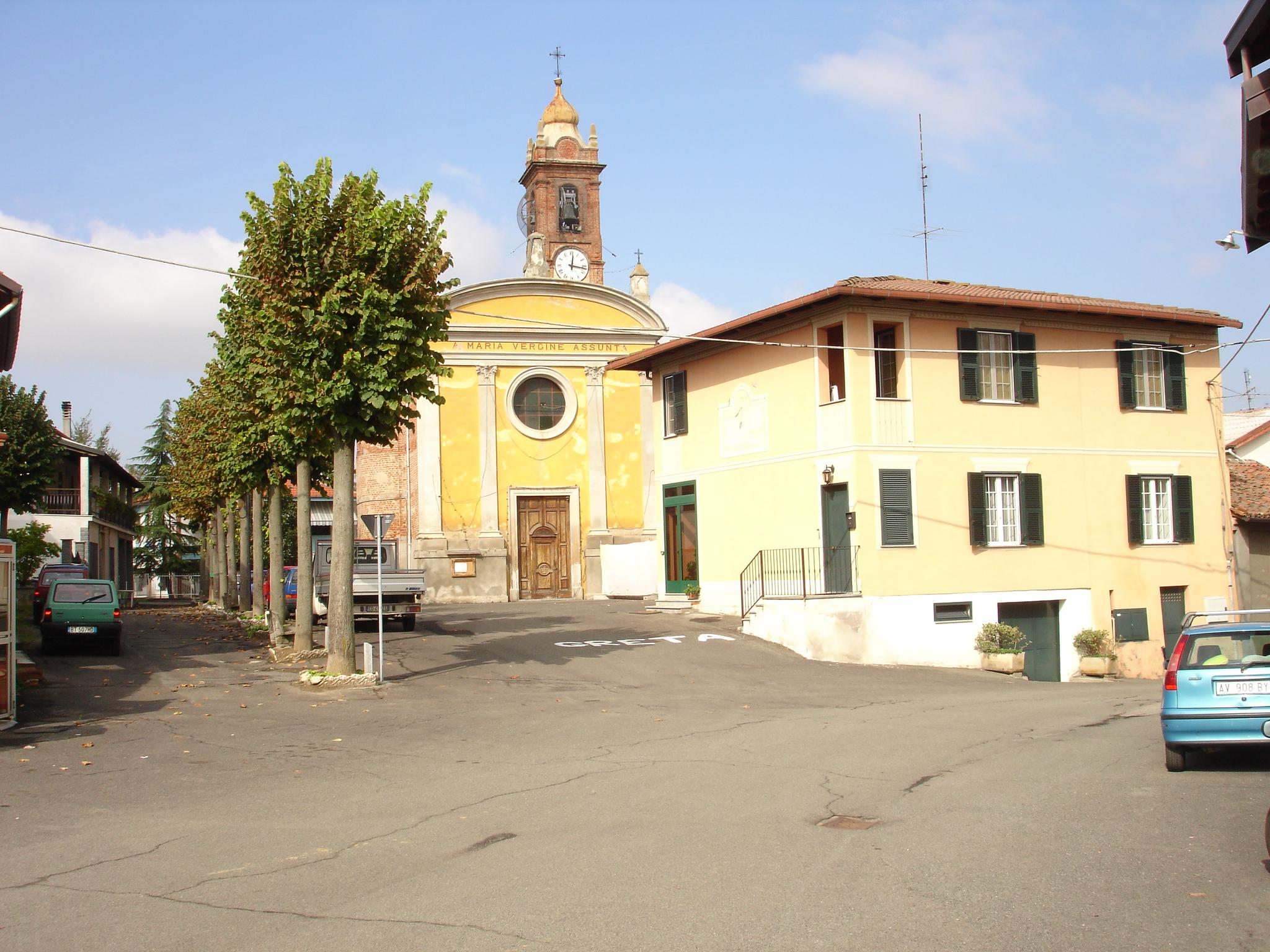
- Parish church.

- Coat of arms

- Location within Italy Location within Piedmont
- Coordinates: 44°50′N 8°28′E
- Country: Italy
- Region: Piedmont
- Province: Alessandria (AL)

Government
  - Mayor: Silvia Barbara Celoria

Area
  - Total: 9.13 km^{2} (3.53 sq mi)
- Elevation: 160 m (520 ft)

Population (31 May 2017)
  - Total: 330
  - Density: 36/km^{2} (94/sq mi)
- Demonym: Carentinesi
- Time zone: UTC+1 (CET)
  - Summer (DST): UTC+2 (CEST)
- Postal code: 15022
- Dialing code: 0131
- Website: Official website

Carentino is a comune (municipality) in the Province of Alessandria in the Italian region of Piedmont, located about 70 kilometres (43 mi) southeast of Turin and about 15 kilometres (9 mi) southwest of Alessandria.

Carentino borders the following municipalities: Bergamasco, Borgoratto Alessandrino, Bruno, Frascaro, Gamalero, Mombaruzzo, and Oviglio.
