= Bruno, Piedmont =

Bruno
- Comune
- Comune di Bruno
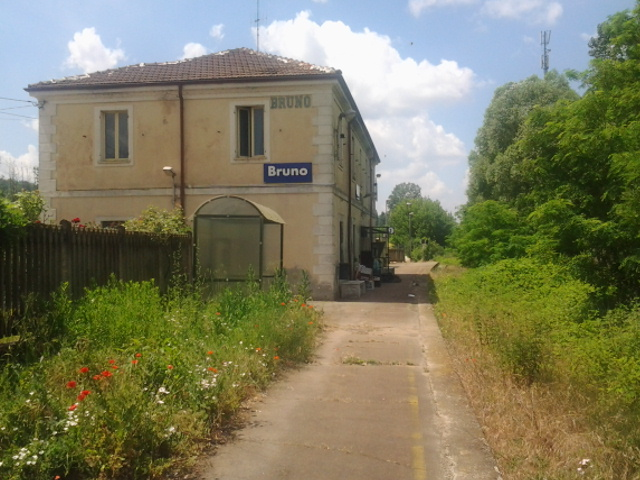
- Railway station.

- Coat of arms

- Location within Italy Location within Piedmont
- Coordinates: 44°48′N 8°26′E
- Country: Italy
- Region: Piedmont
- Province: Asti (AT)

Government
  - Mayor: Lucas Bonzo

Area
  - Total: 8.9 km^{2} (3.4 sq mi)
- Elevation: 198 m (650 ft)

Population (31 December 2019)
  - Total: 309
  - Density: 35/km^{2} (90/sq mi)
- Demonym: Brunesi
- Time zone: UTC+1 (CET)
  - Summer (DST): UTC+2 (CEST)
- Postal code: 14040
- Dialing code: 0141
- Patron saint: S.Bartolomeo
- Website: Official website

Bruno is a comune (municipality) in the Province of Asti in the Italian region Piedmont, located about 70 kilometres (43 mi) southeast of Turin and about 20 kilometres (12 mi) southeast of Asti.

Bruno borders the following municipalities: Bergamasco, Carentino, Castelnuovo Belbo, and Mombaruzzo.
