= SMS Erzherzog Ferdinand Max (1865) =

Ironclad warship of the Austro-Hungarian Navy

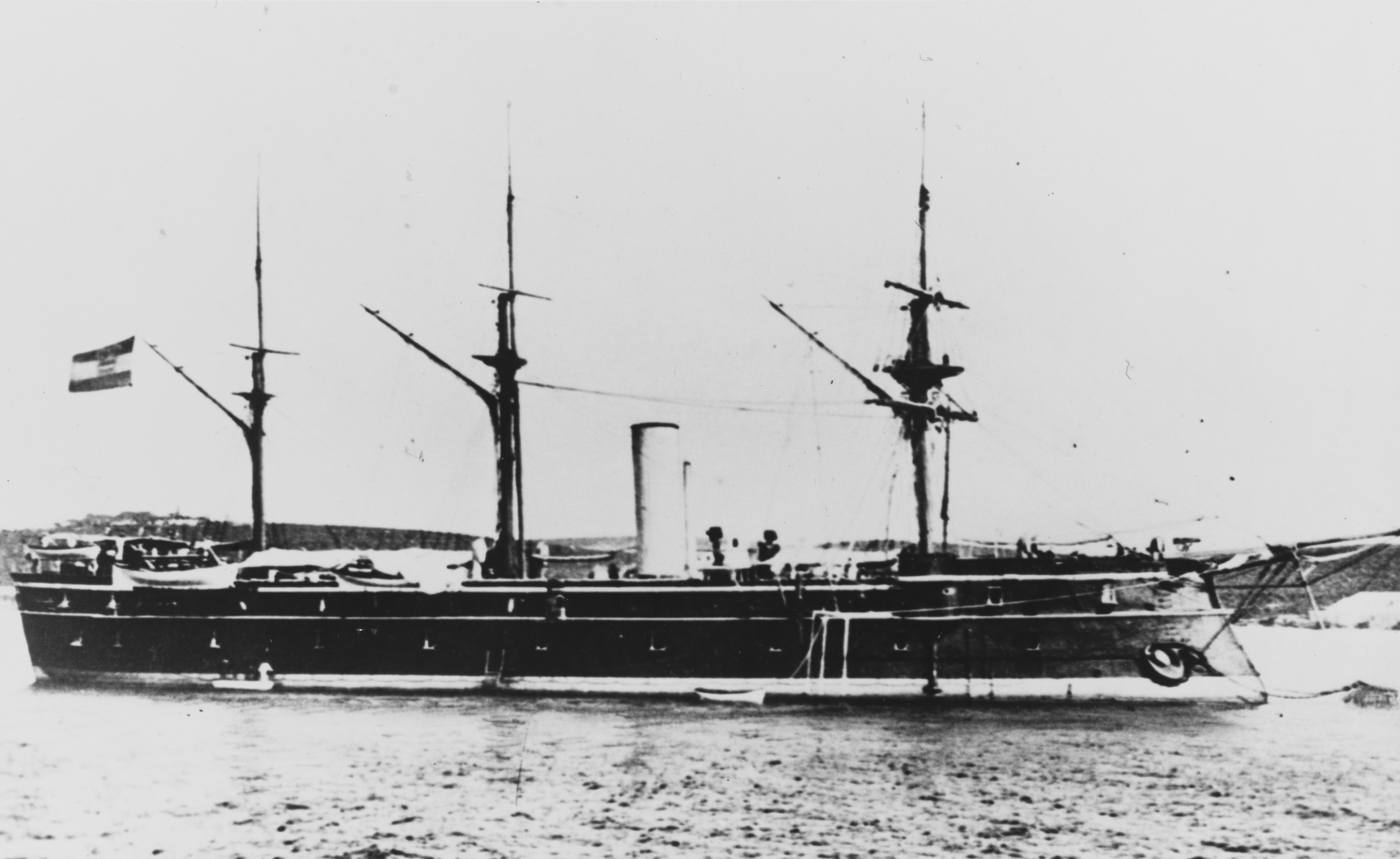
- Erzherzog Ferdinand Max after 1880

History

Austrian Empire
- Name: Erzherzog Ferdinand Max
- Namesake: Archduke Ferdinand Max
- Builder: Stabilimento Tecnico Triestino, Trieste
- Laid down: 6 May 1863
- Launched: 24 May 1865
- Commissioned: June 1866
- Stricken: 19 May 1886
- Fate: Scrapped, 1916

General characteristics
- Class & type: Erzherzog Ferdinand Max class
- Displacement: 5,130 long tons (5,210 t)
- Length: 83.75 meters (274 ft 9 in) oa
- Beam: 15.96 m (52 ft 4 in)
- Draft: 7.14 m (23 ft 5 in)
- Installed power: 2,925 indicated horsepower (2,181 kW)
- Propulsion: 1 × marine steam engine; 1 × screw propeller
- Speed: 12.54 knots (23.22 km/h; 14.43 mph)
- Crew: 511
- Armament: 16 × 48-pounder guns; 4 × 8-pounder guns; 2 × 3-pounder guns
- Armor: Battery: 123 mm (5 in); Ends: 87 mm (3.4 in)

SMS Erzherzog Ferdinand Max was the lead ship of the Erzherzog Ferdinand Max class of broadside ironclads built for the Austrian Navy in the 1860s. She was built by the Stabilimento Tecnico Triestino, with her keel laying in October 1863, launching in May 1865, and commissioning in June 1866 at the outbreak of the Third Italian War of Independence and the Austro-Prussian War, fought concurrently. The ship was armed with a main battery of sixteen 48-pounder guns, though the rifled guns originally intended, which had been ordered from Prussia, had to be replaced with old smoothbore guns until after the conflicts ended.

Stationed in the Adriatic Sea, Erzherzog Ferdinand Max served as the flagship of the Austrian fleet under Rear Admiral Wilhelm von Tegetthoff. She saw action at the Battle of Lissa in July 1866, where she rammed and sank the Italian ironclad Re d'Italia. Slightly damaged in the collision, Erzherzog Ferdinand Max had her bow repaired in Malta after the war. She remained in the Austro-Hungarian fleet for the next twenty years, but severely reduced naval budgets owing to Hungarian disinterest in naval matters led to an uneventful career. She was rearmed with newer guns in 1874 and again in 1882. Stricken from the naval register in May 1886, Erzherzog Ferdinand Max was employed as a tender to the gunnery training school from 1889 to 1908. She remained in the inventory until 1916 when she was broken up for scrap.

== Design ==
Line-drawing of Erzherzog Ferdinand Max

The construction of the five ironclad warships of the Drache and Kaiser Max classes in the Austro-Italian ironclad arms race prompted the Austrian government to convene a commission in early 1862 to study future naval development, and crucially, the question of whether the navy should be oriented toward power projection from the Adriatic or purely defensive of the Austrian Littoral. The commission had deadlocked by April, but the recent Battle of Hampton Roads in the American Civil War—the first engagement between two ironclads—had demonstrated the ascendancy of the new ships and convinced the Reichsrat (Imperial Council) to grant a significant increase for the naval budget, which allowed two new ironclads to be ordered in 1863, which became the Erzherzog Ferdinand Max class.

Erzherzog Ferdinand Max was 83.75 meters (274 ft 9 in) long overall; she had a beam of 15.96 m (52 ft 4 in) and an average draft of 7.14 m (23 ft 5 in). She displaced 5,130 long tons (5,210 t). She had a crew of 511 officers and enlisted men. Her propulsion system consisted of one single-expansion steam engine, manufactured by the Stabilimento Tecnico shipyard in Fiume, that drove a single screw propeller. The number and type of her coal-fired boilers have not survived, but they were vented through a single funnel located amidships. Her engine produced a top speed of 12.54 knots (23.22 km/h; 14.43 mph) from 2,925 indicated horsepower (2,181 kW).

Erzherzog Ferdinand Max was a broadside ironclad, and she was armed with a main battery of sixteen 48-pounder muzzle-loading guns, eight guns per broadside. She also carried several smaller guns, including four 8-pounder guns and two 3-pounders. The ship's hull was sheathed with wrought iron armor that was 123 mm (5 in) thick on the battery and reduced to 87 mm (3.4 in) at the bow and stern.

== Service history ==
Erzherzog Ferdinand Max was laid down at the Stabilimento Tecnico Triestino shipyard in Trieste on 6 May 1863. She was launched on 24 May 1865; the builders were forced to complete fitting-out work quickly, as tensions with neighboring Prussia and Italy erupted into the concurrent Austro-Prussian War and the Third Italian War of Independence in June 1866. Erzherzog Ferdinand Max's rifled heavy guns were still on order from Krupp, and they could not be delivered due to the conflict with Prussia. Instead, the ship was armed with old smooth-bore guns. Rear Admiral Wilhelm von Tegetthoff, the commander of the Austrian Fleet, immediately began to mobilize his fleet. As the ships became fully crewed, they began to conduct training exercises in Fasana. With his flag aboard Erzherzog Ferdinand Max, Tegetthoff brought the Austrian fleet to Ancona on 26 June in an attempt to draw out the Italians, but the Italian commander, Admiral Carlo Pellion di Persano, did not sortie to engage Tegetthoff. The Italian failure to give battle is frequently cited as an example of Persano's cowardice, but in fact, the Italian fleet was taking on coal and other supplies after the voyage from Taranto, and was not able to go to sea. Tegetthoff made another sortie on 6 July, but again could not bring the Italian fleet to battle.

=== Battle of Lissa ===
On 16 July, Persano took the Italian fleet, with twelve ironclads, out of Ancona, bound for the island of Lissa, where they arrived on the 18th. With them, they brought troop transports carrying 3,000 soldiers. Persano then spent the next two days bombarding the Austrian defenses of the island and unsuccessfully attempting to force a landing. Tegetthoff received a series of telegrams between the 17 and 19 July notifying him of the Italian attack, which he initially believed to be a feint to draw the Austrian fleet away from its main bases at Pola and Venice. By the morning of the 19th, however, he was convinced that Lissa was in fact the Italian objective, and so he requested permission to attack. As Tegetthoff's fleet arrived off Lissa on the morning of 20 July, Persano's fleet was arrayed for another landing attempt. The latter's ships were divided into three groups, with only the first two able to concentrate in time to meet the Austrians. Tegetthoff had arranged his ironclad ships into a wedge-shaped formation, leading with Erzherzog Ferdinand Max at the center; the wooden warships of the second and third divisions followed behind in the same formation.

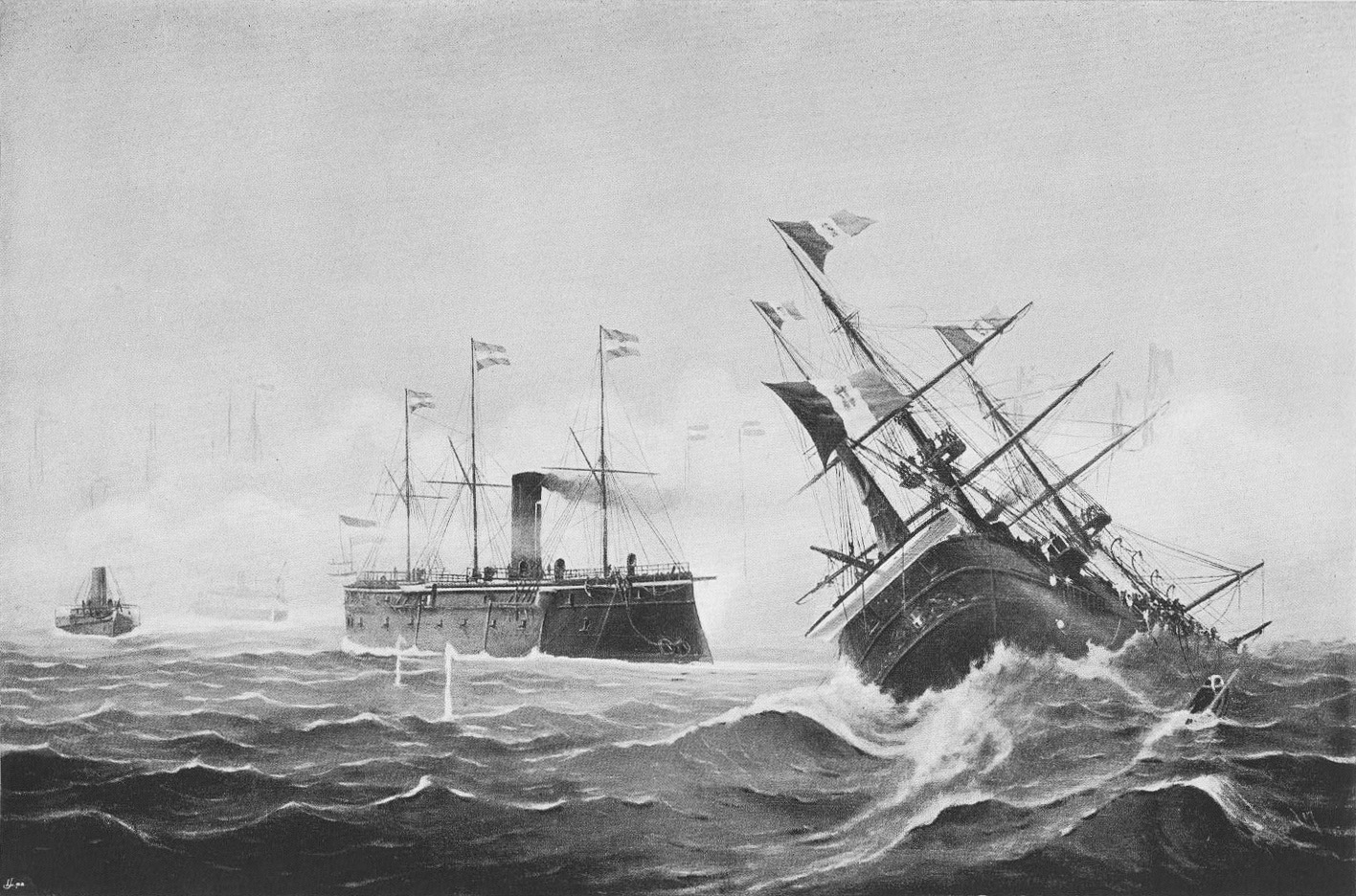
An illustration of Re d'Italia rolling over after having been rammed by Erzherzog Ferdinand Max

While he was forming up his ships, Persano transferred from his flagship, Re d'Italia, to the turret ship Affondatore. This created a gap in the Italian line, and Tegetthoff seized the opportunity to divide the Italian fleet and create a melee. He made a pass through the gap, but failed to ram any of the Italian ships, forcing him to turn around and make another attempt. During the second attempt, Austrian gunfire had disabled Re d'Italia's rudder, leaving her incapable of maneuvering. Tegetthoff seized the opportunity to ram the Italian vessel, and ordered his ship to maximum speed. After two collisions that occurred at angles too oblique to inflict serious damage, Erzherzog Ferdinand Max struck the ship more directly. The Austrian ship's ram tore a gaping hole in Re d'Italia's hull on the port side, though Erzherzog Ferdinand Max sustained no significant damage herself. Tegetthoff reversed course, allowing the Italian ironclad to lurch back to port and quickly sink. Tegetthoff initially ordered his crew to lower boats to pick up the Italians struggling in the water, but the Italian ironclad San Martino was approaching, and he could not allow his ship to become a stationary target. Instead, he ordered the aviso Kaiserin Elizabeth to remain behind and pick up the survivors while Erzherzog Ferdinand Max engaged San Martino. The other Italian ships, however, did not realize Kaiserin Elizabeth was attempting to pick up the Italian survivors, and so opened fire on her, driving her away from the men in the water.

By this time, the coastal defense ship Palestro was burning badly, soon to be destroyed by a magazine explosion. Persano broke off the engagement, having lost two ships, and though his squadron still outnumbered the Austrians, he refused to counter-attack with his badly demoralized forces. In addition, the fleet was low on coal and ammunition. The Italian fleet began to withdraw, followed by the Austrians; Tegetthoff, having gotten the better of the action, kept his distance so as not to risk his success. Additionally, the Austrian ships were slower than their Italian counterparts, and so they could not force a second engagement. As night began to fall, the opposing fleets disengaged completely, heading for Ancona and Pola, respectively. Erzherzog Ferdinand Max had fired 156 shells in the course of the battle. She had kept boarding parties on her deck, ready to attack Italian vessels, but the opportunity had not presented itself in the engagement; steam-powered ships could simply reverse course and disengage before a boarding party could cross over. Erzherzog Ferdinand Max was not significantly damaged by Italian fire or the ramming attempts. A few armor plates were slightly dislodged, the paint had been stripped from the hull where she had collided with Re d'Italia, and she had a minor leak from the concussion, but she was otherwise unscathed.

=== Later career ===
After returning to Pola, Tegetthoff kept his fleet in the northern Adriatic, where it patrolled against a possible Italian attack. The Italian ships never came, and on 12 August, the two countries signed the Armistice of Cormons; this ended the fighting and led to the Treaty of Vienna. Though Austria had defeated Italy at Lissa and on land at the Battle of Custoza, the Austrian army was decisively defeated by Prussia at the Battle of Königgrätz. With the war over, Erzherzog Ferdinand Max went into the British Royal Navy shipyard in Malta to have her bow repaired. As a result of Austria's defeat, Kaiser Franz Joseph was forced to accede to Hungarian demands for greater autonomy, and the country became Austria-Hungary in the Ausgleich of 1867. The two halves of the Dual Monarchy held veto power over the other, and Hungarian disinterest in naval expansion led to severely reduced budgets for the fleet. In the immediate aftermath of the war, the bulk of the Austrian fleet was decommissioned and disarmed.

In 1869, Erzherzog Ferdinand Max was assigned to a squadron sent to patrol the Levant in the eastern Mediterranean; she served as the flagship of Rear Admiral Friedrich von Pöck. The squadron also included the ironclad Salamander, the screw corvette Helgoland, the gunboats Streiter, Reka, and Hum, and the screw schooner Kerka. In early September, Erzherzog Ferdinand Max and Salamander cruised off the island of Rhodes, and on 12 September, they stopped in Smyrna for Salamander to have her bolers repaired. Helgoland joined them there later that month with mail for the ships. Erzherzog Ferdinand Max and Helgoland departed on 28 September to visit Mytilene, arriving on 2 October. From there, the ships sailed on to Urla, where Pöck received orders to return to Smyrna to await instructions to join Franz Joseph for the opening of the Suez Canal. While waiting for Franz Joseph to arrive, Erzherzog Ferdinand Max moved to Çanakkale to take on coal on 26 October; there, she met the Italian ironclad Roma, which had carried Vice Admiral Prince Amadeo for a visit to Constantinople. On 28 October, Pöck arrived aboard the steamer Fiume and returned to Erzherzog Ferdinand Max.

In the meantime, the Kaiser was taking a tour of the countries of the eastern Mediterranean Sea; he came aboard his yacht Greif after arriving in Constantinople. Greif then departed Constantinople with a squadron of ironclads of the Ottoman fleet as escort. After passing through the Dardanelles, they were joined by Erzherzog Ferdinand Max, her sister ship Habsburg, and a pair of paddle steamers, which then escorted the Kaiser for the trip to Port Said at the mouth of the Suez Canal. The two ironclads remained in the Mediterranean while the other vessels passed through the Canal into the Red Sea in company with Empress Eugenie of France aboard her own yacht. Erzherzog Ferdinand Max and Habsburg were detached on 16 November, steaming first to Souda Bay on the island of Crete, but severe storms forced them to seek shelter at Navarin on 25 November. They then sailed for Corfu, where they met Greif and the rest of the squadron, which soon departed. Erzherzog Ferdinand Max and Habsburg sailed independently to Pola, but heavy storms prompted Pöck to be concerned for the safety of Franz Joseph, so he sailed on to Trieste to see whether Greif had arrived or not. After he received word of Franz Joseph's arrival, Pöck took his ships back to Pola for maintenance following their cruise.

In 1874 she was rearmed with a battery of fourteen 7 in (178 mm) muzzle-loading Armstrong guns and four light guns. Her battery was revised again in 1882, with the addition of four 9 cm (3.5 in) breech-loader guns, two 7 cm (2.8 in) breech-loaders, a pair of 47 mm (1.9 in) quick-firing revolver guns, and three 25 mm (0.98 in) auto-cannons. Erzherzog Ferdinand Max was stricken from the naval register on 19 May 1886 and her armament was reduced to eight 10 cm (3.9 in) guns. The following year, these were removed and a single 26 cm (10 in) gun and a 24 cm (9.4 in) gun were installed. From 1889 to 1908, she served as a tender to the gunnery training school. The ship was ultimately broken up for scrap in 1916 during World War I.
