= Italian ironclad Re d'Italia =

Ironclad warship of the Italian Royal Navy

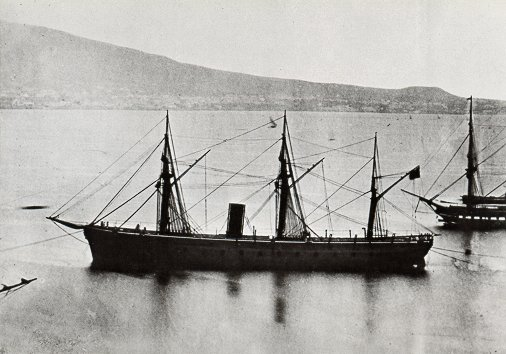
- Re d'Italia or her sister Re di Portogallo

History

Italy
- Name: Re d'Italia
- Ordered: 14 December 1859
- Builder: William H. Webb, New York City
- Laid down: 21 November 1861
- Launched: 18 April 1863
- Completed: 14 September 1864
- Fate: Sunk by ramming, 20 July 1866, in the Battle of Lissa

General characteristics
- Class & type: Re d'Italia-class ironclad
- Displacement: Normal: 5,610 long tons (5,700 t); Full load: 5,869 long tons (5,963 t)
- Length: 99.61 m (326 ft 10 in) (o/a)
- Beam: 16.76 m (55 ft)
- Draft: 6.17 m (20 ft 3 in)
- Installed power: 4 × fire-tube boilers; 1,812 to 1,845 ihp (1,351 to 1,376 kW)
- Propulsion: 1 × marine steam engine; 1 × screw propeller
- Sail plan: Barque-rigged
- Speed: 10.6 to 10.8 knots (19.6 to 20.0 km/h; 12.2 to 12.4 mph)
- Range: 1,800 nmi (3,300 km; 2,100 mi) at 12 knots (22 km/h; 14 mph)
- Complement: 565
- Armament: 6 × 72-pounder 203 mm (8 in) smoothbore guns; 32 × 6.5 in (164 mm) rifled muzzle-loaders
- Armor: Belt: 114 mm (4.5 in)

Re d'Italia (King of Italy) was the lead ship of the Re d'Italia-class armored frigates built in the United States for the Italian Regia Marina (Royal Navy) in the early 1860s. She was laid down at the William H. Webb Shipyard in New York in November 1861, was launched in April 1863, and was completed a year later in September 1864; the two Re d'Italia-class ships were the only Italian ironclads built in the United States. The ships were broadside ironclads, armed with a battery of six 72-pounder guns and thirty-two 164 mm (6.5 in) guns.

Re d'Italia initially served as the flagship of the Italian fleet, though she was replaced by the turret ship Affondatore shortly before the Battle of Lissa in 1866. During that battle, Re d'Italia was at the center of the melee. After her rudder was disabled by an Austrian vessel, the Austrian flagship, Erzherzog Ferdinand Max, rammed her and tore a large hole in her hull. Re d'Italia quickly rolled over and sank, taking some 400 of her crew with the ship, including her captain, Emilio Faà di Bruno.

== Design ==
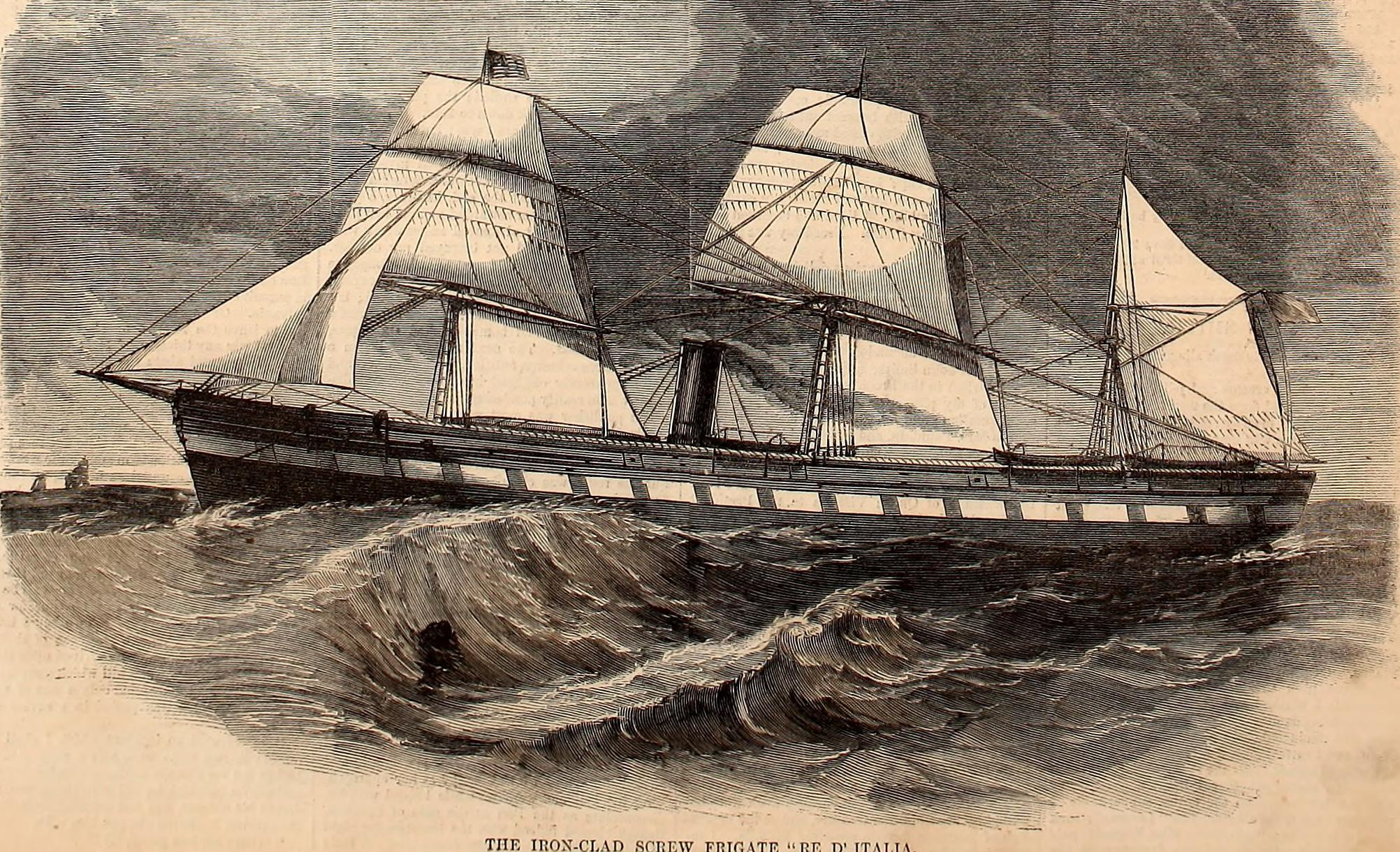
Illustration of Re d'Italia, Harper's Weekly, 1864

Following the creation of the Regia Marina (Royal Navy) in March 1861 as part of the unification of the Kingdom of Italy, the new navy embarked on a construction program to prepare for what it saw as an inevitable war with the Austrian Navy. As part of the program, the Italians ordered a pair of ironclads from the United States, since the shipbuilding firms in Italy could not support the number of ships needed. These two ships, which were based heavily on the French ironclad Gloire, were the largest ironclads in the Italian fleet for several years.

Re d'Italia was 99.61 meters (326 ft 10 in) long overall; she had a beam of 16.76 m (55 ft) and an average draft of 6.17 m (20 ft 3 in). She displaced 5,610 long tons (5,700 t) normally and up to 5,869 long tons (5,963 t) at full load. Her hull was built from unseasoned green wood. Because her hull was of wooden construction, it could not be divided into watertight compartments. She had a crew of 565.

The ship's propulsion system consisted of one single-expansion marine steam engine that drove a single screw propeller. Steam was supplied by four coal-fired, rectangular fire-tube boilers, which were vented through a single funnel located amidships. Her engine produced a top speed of 10.6 to 10.8 knots (19.6 to 20.0 km/h; 12.2 to 12.4 mph) from 1,812 to 1,845 indicated horsepower (1,351 to 1,376 kW). She could steam for about 1,800 nautical miles (3,300 km; 2,100 mi) at a speed of 10.5 knots (19.4 km/h; 12.1 mph). For long-distance travel, Re d'Italia was fitted with three masts and was barque-rigged.

Re d'Italia was a broadside ironclad, and she was armed with a main battery of six 72-pounder 203 mm (8 in) guns and thirty-two 164 mm (6.5 in) rifled muzzle-loading guns. The ship was equipped with a spur-shaped ram at the bow. The ship's hull was sheathed with wrought iron armor that was 121 mm (4.75 in) thick. Her rudder and propellers, however, were not protected by her armor.

== Service history ==
Re d'Italia was built by William H. Webb at his shipyard in New York City. She was laid down on 21 November 1861 and launched on 18 April 1863. The ship arrived in Italy in April 1864 and was commissioned into the Italian fleet on 18 September 1864. Less than two years later, in June 1866, Italy declared war on Austria, as part of the Third Italian War of Independence, which was fought concurrently with the Austro-Prussian War. The Italian fleet commander, Admiral Carlo Pellion di Persano, initially adopted a cautious course of action; he was unwilling to risk battle with the Austrian Navy, despite the fact that the Austrian fleet was much weaker than his own. Persano claimed he was simply waiting on the ironclad ram Affondatore, en route from Britain, but his inaction weakened morale in the fleet, with many of his subordinates openly accusing him of cowardice.

Rear Admiral Wilhelm von Tegetthoff brought the Austrian fleet to Ancona on June 27, in attempt to draw out the Italians. At the time, many of the Italian ships were in disarray; several ships did not have their entire armament, and several others had problems with their engines. Re d'Italia had a fire burning in her coal bunkers. Persano held a council of war aboard the ironclad Principe di Carignano to determine whether he should sortie to engage Tegetthoff, but by that time, the Austrians had withdrawn, making the decision moot. The Minister of the Navy, Agostino Depretis, urged Persano to act and suggested the island of Lissa, to restore Italian confidence after their defeat at the Battle of Custoza the previous month. On 7 July, Persano left Ancona and conducted a sweep into the Adriatic, but encountered no Austrian ships and returned on the 13th.

=== Battle of Lissa ===
On 16 July, Persano took the Italian fleet out of Ancona, bound for Lissa, where they arrived on the 18th. With them, they brought troop transports carrying 3,000 soldiers; the Italian warships began bombarding the Austrian forts on the island, with the intention of landing the soldiers once the fortresses had been silenced. In response, the Austrian Navy sent the fleet under Tegetthoff to attack the Italian ships. At that time, Re d'Italia was Persano's flagship in the 2nd Division, along with the ironclad San Martino and the coastal defense ship Palestro. The Italian 2nd and 3rd Divisions were sent to attack the coastal batteries protecting the town of Vis on 18 July; Re d'Italia, Formidabile, San Martino, and Palestro were assigned the eastern defenses, while four other ironclads were tasked with suppressing the batteries on the western side. Formidabile was sent to engage Fort San Giorgio at close range while the other ironclads shelled it from afar; one shell from the ironclad Regina Maria Pia detonated the fort's powder magazine, which neutralized the defenses. The success prompted Persano to order several ironclads to attempt to force an entrance into the harbor, but heavy Austrian artillery fire forced him to break off the attempt. After the attack failed, the Italians withdrew late in the day, preparing to launch another attack the following morning.

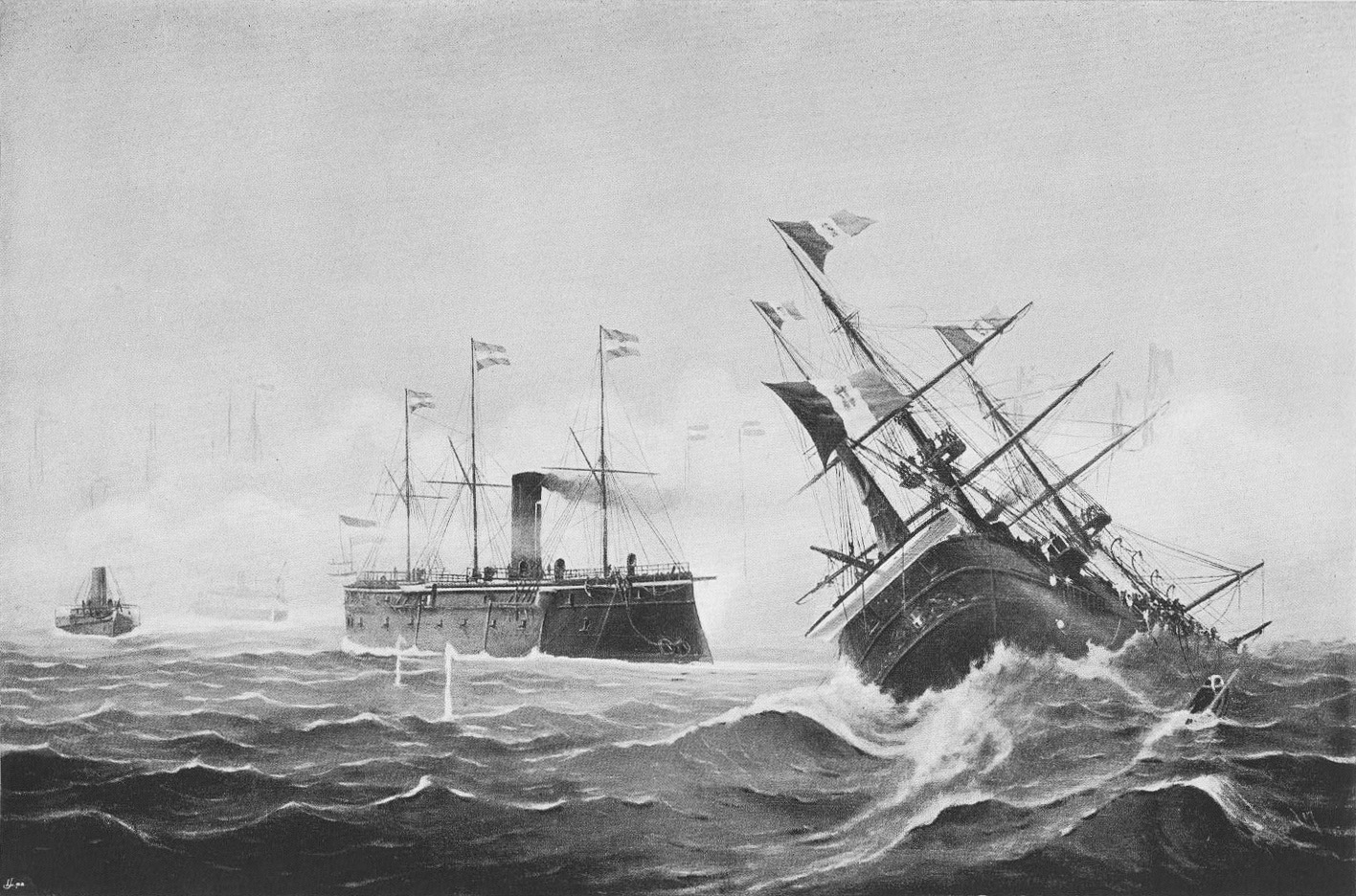
An illustration of Re d'Italia rolling over after having been rammed by SMS Erzherzog Ferdinand Max

The next morning, Persano ordered another attack; four ironclads would force the harbor defenses at Vis while Re d'Italia and the rest of the fleet would attempt to suppress the outer fortifications. This assault also failed to neutralize the Austrian coastal fortifications, and two ships were damaged in the fighting. With the day's attacks again having yielded no results, Persano met with his senior officers to discuss options. His chief of staff, d'Amico, and Vacca both suggested a withdrawal owing to the shortage of coal, but Persano ruled that out. He ultimately decided to make another attempt on the 20th. Vacca would take his three ships to patrol to the north-east of the island while the rest of the fleet would again try to land the soldiers.

Before the Italians could begin the attack, but after the fleet had begun to disperse for the landing operation, the dispatch boat Esploratore arrived, bringing news of Tegetthoff's approach. Persano's fleet was in disarray; the three ships of Admiral Giovanni Vacca's 1st Division were three miles to the northeast from Persano's main force, and three other ironclads were further away to the west. Persano immediately ordered his ships to form up with Vacca's, first in line abreast formation, and then in line ahead formation. Re d'Italia was the fourth ship in the Italian line, behind only Vacca's ships.

Shortly before the action began, Persano decided to leave Re d'Italia and transfer to Affondatore, though none of his subordinates on the other ships were aware of the change. They were thus left to fight as individuals without direction. More dangerously, by stopping Re d'Italia, he allowed a significant gap to open up between Vacca's three ships and the rest of the fleet. Tegetthoff took his fleet through the gap between Vacca's and Persano's ships, though he failed to ram any Italian vessels on the first pass. The Austrians then turned back toward Persano's ships, and took Re d'Italia, San Martino, and Palestro under heavy fire. The Austrian ships concentrated their fire on Re d'Italia, paying particular attention to her stern. In their attempts to ram her, one of the Austrian ships destroyed Re d'Italia's rudder, leaving her unmaneuverable.

Re d'Italia's captain, Emilio Faà di Bruno, attempted to escape from the melee, but he could only steer his ship using her engines. Blocked by another Austrian ironclad, Faà di Bruno ordered his ship to reverse course. She was almost stopped when she was rammed by the Austrian flagship, Erzherzog Ferdinand Max. The Austrian ship's ram tore a gaping hole in Re d'Italia's hull. She quickly rolled over to port and sank. Out of her crew, only 166 men were saved; the remaining 400 went down with the ship, including Faà di Bruno.
