= Castelspina =

- Comune
- Comune di Castelspina
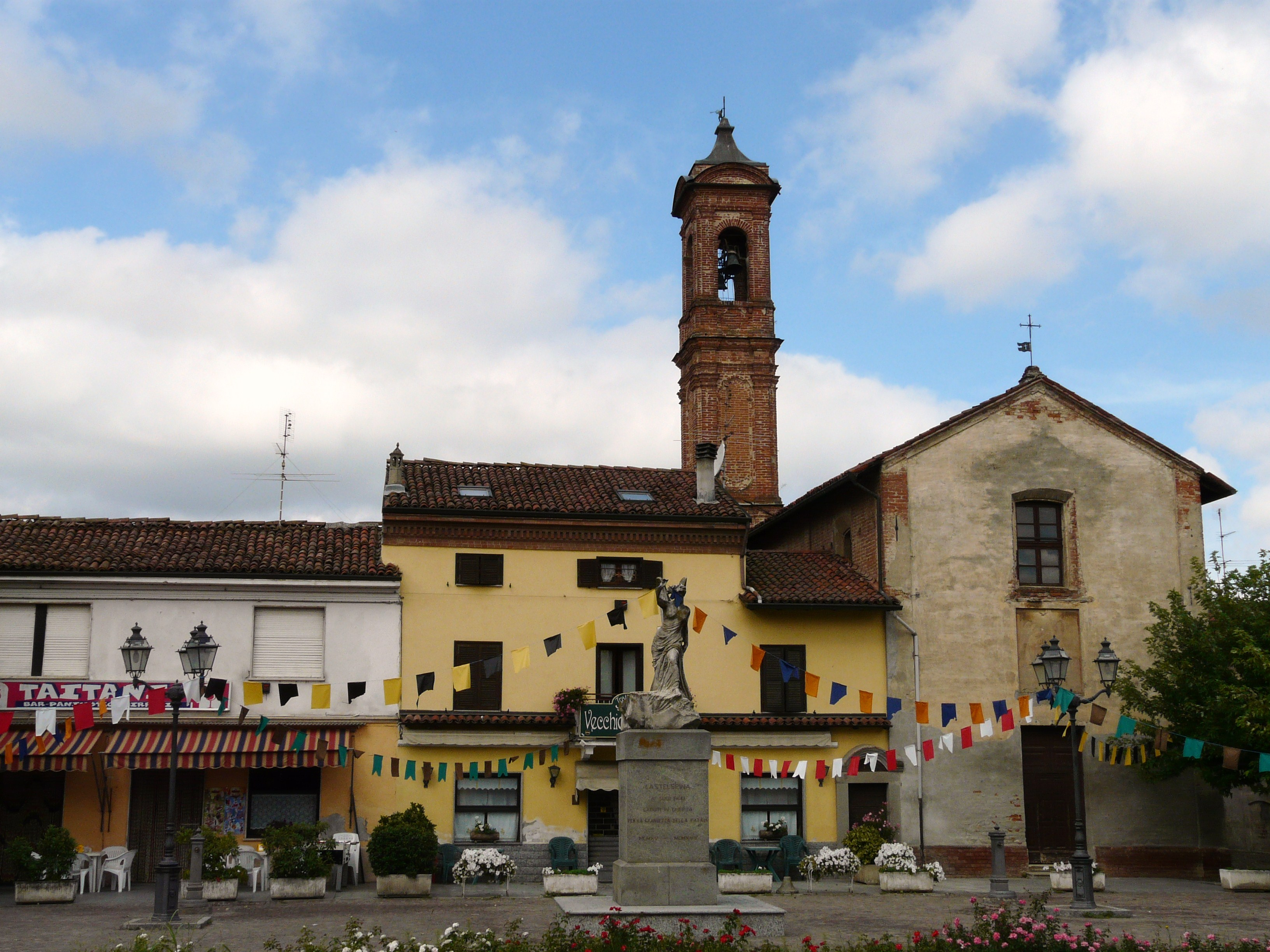
- Main square

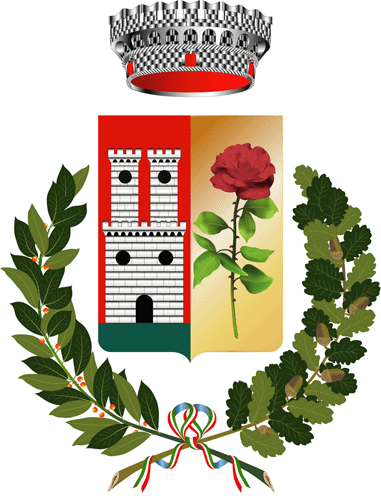
- Coat of arms

- Location within Italy Location within Piedmont
- Coordinates: 44°48′N 8°34′E
- Country: Italy
- Region: Piedmont
- Province: Alessandria (AL)

Government
  - Mayor: Claudio Mussi

Area
  - Total: 5.5 km^{2} (2.1 sq mi)
- Elevation: 116 m (381 ft)

Population (1 January 2009)
  - Total: 424
  - Density: 77/km^{2} (200/sq mi)
- Demonym: Castelspinesi
- Time zone: UTC+1 (CET)
  - Summer (DST): UTC+2 (CEST)
- Postal code: 15070
- Dialing code: 0131
- Patron saint: St. Bernardino of Siena
- Saint day: 20 May

Castelspina is a comune (municipality) in the Province of Alessandria in the Italian region Piedmont, located about 70 kilometres (43 mi) southeast of Turin and about 14 kilometres (9 mi) southwest of Alessandria.

== Notable people ==
- Giovanni Canestri (born 1918), Archbishop Emeritus of Genoa.
