= ARA General Belgrano (1896) =

Argentine armoured naval cruiser

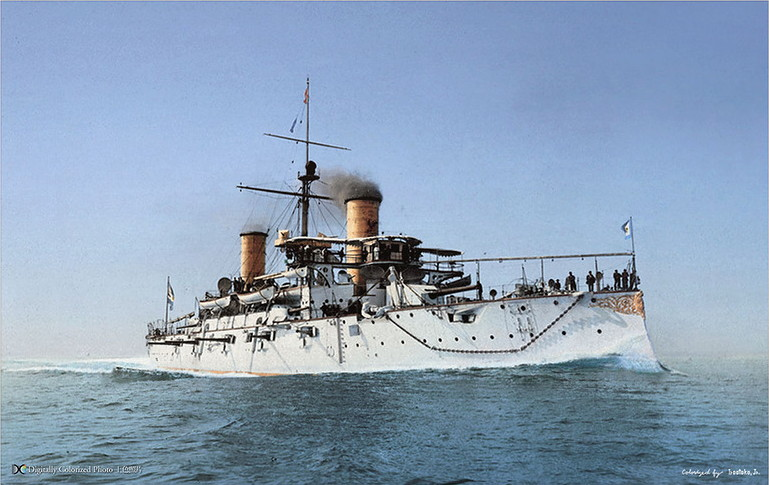
- General Belgrano at sea before 1927

History

Argentina
- Name: Belgrano
- Namesake: Manuel Belgrano
- Builder: Cantiere navale fratelli Orlando, Livorno
- Launched: 25 July 1897
- Completed: 8 October 1898
- Acquired: 1897
- Stricken: 8 May 1947
- Fate: Sold for scrap, 1953

General characteristics (as built)
- Class & type: Giuseppe Garibaldi-class armored cruiser
- Displacement: 8,100 t (8,000 long tons) (deep load)
- Length: 106.7 m (350 ft 1 in)
- Beam: 16.2 m (53 ft 2 in)
- Draft: 7.6 m (25 ft)
- Installed power: 8 cylindrical boilers; 13,000 ihp (9,700 kW)
- Propulsion: 2 shafts; 2 triple-expansion steam engines
- Speed: 18 knots (33 km/h; 21 mph)
- Range: 6,000 nautical miles (11,000 km; 6,900 mi) at 10 knots (19 km/h; 12 mph)
- Complement: 488
- Armament: 2 × single 254 mm (10 in) guns; 14 × single 152 mm (6 in) guns; 2 × single 76 mm (3.0 in) guns; 10 × single 57 mm (2.2 in) Hotchkiss guns; 8 × single 37 mm (1.5 in) Maxim guns; 4 × 457 mm (18 in) torpedo tubes
- Armor: Belt: 80–150 mm (3.1–5.9 in); Barbettes: 150 mm (5.9 in); Gun turrets: 150 mm (5.9 in); Conning tower: 150 mm (5.9 in)

ARA General Belgrano was a Giuseppe Garibaldi-class armoured cruiser of the Argentine Navy. The ship was built in Italy, along with three sister ships also for Argentina (Garibaldi, Pueyrredón and San Martín). The vessel was the first to have been named after the Argentine founding father Manuel Belgrano (1770–1820). The ship was laid down in 1896 and served on the Argentine Navy until she was stricken on 8 May 1947.

== Service history ==
The cruiser was built at the Cantiere Navale Fratelli Orlando, in Livorno, where her hull was laid down in 1896 and launched on 25 July 1897. She was purchased in 1898 by the government of Argentina, engaged in a diplomatic conflict with Chile. After testing of machinery and artillery, General Belgrano entered service on 8 October 1898, departing the same day entered the port of Genoa, under the command of Captain Emilio Barilari, arriving at their destination in Mar del Plata, on November 6 of that year.

After the conflict with Chile, 20 January 1899, she carried the President of Argentina Julio Argentino Roca and the President of Chile Federico Errazuriz Echaurren for signing the peace treaty. After visiting Santa Cruz, Rio Gallegos, Puerto Harberton and Ushuaia, arrived on February 15, 1899, in Punta Arenas where the two presidents signed the peace treaty between the two countries.

In 1902 she was put on hold and after being fitted with a telegraph set in 1907, she was drafted into the fleet again in 1908. In 1912 she was equipped with a radio transmitter. In 1927 he began work to modernize the naval base of Puerto Belgrano, but before the end of this modernization, left for Europe, visiting Genoa, from 7 to 16 October, where the crew attended the unveiling of a monument to General Belgrano. Later, she visited Spain and again returned to Genoa to continue the modernization work, including the conversion of boilers to consume gasoline, installing a new mast and changes in the artillery.

At the end of this modernization, 25 October 1929, arriving part to Buenos Aires on 24 November next. In 1933 she ranked as a coast guard ship and in December the same year was sent to Mar de Plata to be used as a depot ship for submarines. On 8 May 1947, after nearly 50 years of service, General Belgrano was discharged. Towed to Buenos Aires, she was broken up in the Matanza River shipyards.
