= Italian cruiser Giuseppe Garibaldi (1899) =

Italian lead ship of Giuseppe Garibaldi-class

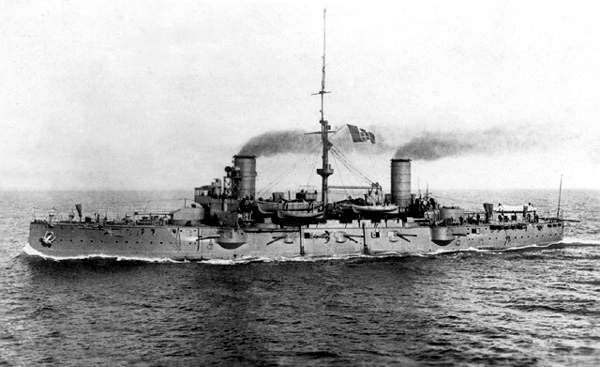
- Giuseppe Garibaldi underway

History

Regia MarinaItaly
- Name: Giuseppe Garibaldi
- Namesake: General Giuseppe Garibaldi
- Builder: Gio. Ansaldo & C., Genoa-Sestri Ponente
- Laid down: 8 June 1898
- Launched: 29 June 1899
- Completed: 1 January 1901
- Fate: Sunk, 18 July 1915

General characteristics
- Class & type: Giuseppe Garibaldi-class armored cruiser
- Displacement: 7,350 metric tons (7,234 long tons)
- Length: 111.8 m (366 ft 10 in)
- Beam: 18.2 m (59 ft 9 in)
- Draft: 7.3 m (23 ft 11 in)
- Installed power: 13,500 ihp (10,100 kW); 24 Niclausse boilers
- Propulsion: 2 Shafts; 2 Vertical triple-expansion steam engines
- Speed: 19 knots (35 km/h; 22 mph)
- Range: 5,500 nmi (10,200 km; 6,300 mi) at 10 knots (19 km/h; 12 mph)
- Complement: 555 officers and enlisted men; (578 as flagship)
- Armament: 1 × single 254 mm (10 in) gun; 1 × twin 203 mm (8 in) guns; 14 × single 152 mm (6 in) guns; 10 × single 76 mm (3 in) guns; 6 × single 47 mm (1.9 in) guns; 4 × single 450 mm (17.7 in) torpedo tubes
- Armor: Belt: 80–150 mm (3.1–5.9 in); Deck: 38 mm (1.5 in); Gun turrets: 150 mm; Conning tower: 150 mm; Gun shields: 50 mm (2.0 in)

Giuseppe Garibaldi was the seventh ship of the Giuseppe Garibaldi class of armored cruisers built for the Royal Italian Navy (Regia Marina) in the 1890s. She was built to replace the lead ship of her class, which was sold to Argentina and renamed ARA Garibaldi. The ship often served as a flagship and made several deployments to the Eastern Mediterranean and the Levant during her career. At the beginning of the Italo-Turkish War of 1911–12 she bombarded Tripoli. Giuseppe Garibaldi bombarded Beirut in early 1912 and sank an Ottoman ironclad there. Several months later she bombarded the defenses of the Dardanelles.

The ship spent several months deployed to Albania after the end of the First Balkan War in 1913 to protect Italian interests there. Giuseppe Garibaldi was sunk by an Austro-Hungarian submarine in the Adriatic Sea shortly after Italy declared war on the Central Powers in 1915 with the loss of 53 crewmen. Her wreck was discovered in 2008 and has been examined by underwater archaeologists in subsequent years.

== Design and description ==
Giuseppe Garibaldi had an overall length of 111.8 meters (366 ft 10 in), a beam of 18.2 meters (59 ft 9 in) and a deep draft (hull) of 7.3 meters (23 ft 11 in). She displaced 7,350 metric tons (7,230 long tons) at normal load. The ship was powered by two vertical triple-expansion steam engines, each driving one shaft, using steam from 24 coal-fired Niclausse boilers. The engines were rated 13,500 indicated horsepower (10,100 kW) and designed to give a speed of approximately 20 knots (37 km/h; 23 mph). During her sea trials on 7 September 1900, Giuseppe Garibaldi failed to reach her designed speed, reaching 19.7 knots (36.5 km/h; 22.7 mph) from 14,713 ihp (10,971 kW). She had a cruising range of 5,500 nautical miles (10,200 km; 6,300 mi) at 10 knots (19 km/h; 12 mph). Her complement ordinarily consisted of 555 officers and enlisted men and 578 when acting as a flagship.

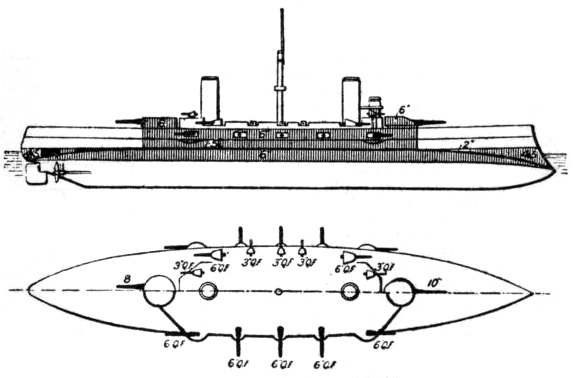
Arrangement of Guns and Armour, “Giuseppe Garibaldi.”

Her main armament consisted of one 254-millimeter (10 in) gun in a turret forward of the superstructure and two 203-millimeter (8 in) guns in a twin turret aft. Ten of the 152-millimeter (6 in) guns that comprised her secondary armament were arranged in casemates amidships; the remaining four 152-millimeter guns were mounted on the upper deck. Giuseppe Garibaldi also had ten 76-millimeter (3 in) and six 47-millimeter (1.9 in) guns to defend herself against torpedo boats. She was fitted with four single 450-millimeter (17.7 in) torpedo tubes.

The ship's waterline armour belt had a maximum thickness of 150 millimeters (5.9 in) amidships and tapered to 80 millimeters (3.1 in) towards the ends of the ship. The conning tower, casemates, and gun turrets were also protected by 150-millimeter armor. Her protective deck armour was 37 millimeters (1.5 in) thick and the 152-millimeter guns on the upper deck were protected by gun shields 50 millimeters (2.0 in) thick.

== Construction and service ==
Giuseppe Garibaldi, named after General Giuseppe Garibaldi, one of the founders of modern Italy, was laid down at the Gio. Ansaldo & C. shipyard in Genoa-Sestri Ponente on 21 September 1898 and launched on 29 June 1899. While conducting preliminary steam trials on 12 July 1900, tubes in two of her boilers burst, killing one crewman and wounding two others. Repairs took until 10 August and she was completed on 1 January 1901. From 23 July to 2 October 1902, the ship cruised the Mediterranean, making port calls at Tripoli and in the Aegean Sea. The following year, Giuseppe Garibaldi made port visits to Algiers, Salonica, and Piraeus, Greece. During the 1905 fleet maneuvers, she was assigned to the "hostile" force blockading La Maddalena, Sardinia. The ship was part of the international expeditionary force that occupied Lemnos and Mytilene in November–December 1905 in a failed effort to force the Ottoman Empire to pay its debts to European countries in a timely manner. Together with her sister ships Francesco Ferruccio and Varese, the ship was in Marseille, France on 15–16 September 1906 to participate in a fleet review for Armand Fallières, President of France, on the latter date. Giuseppe Garibaldi was deployed to the Levant in May–July 1907 and again in June 1908.

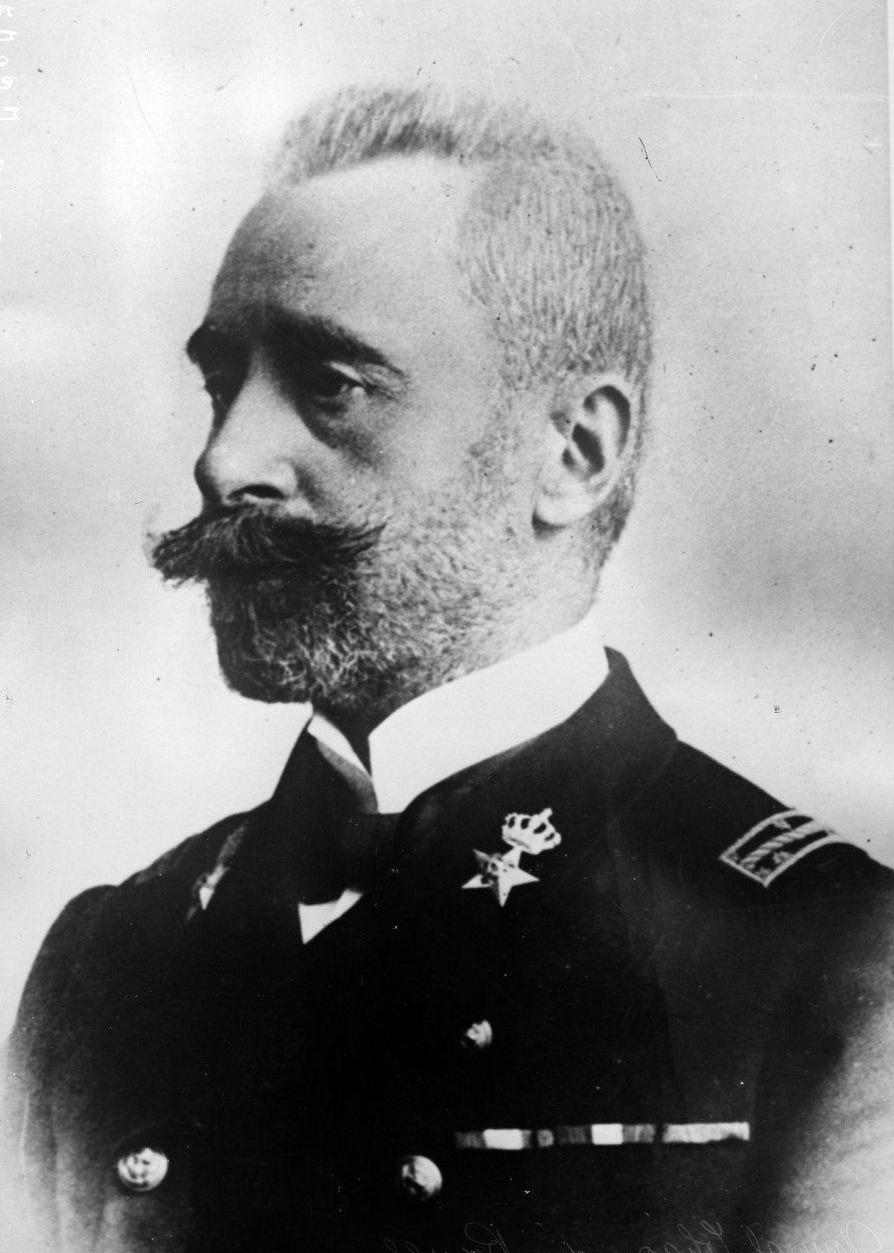
Portrait of Admiral Thaon di Revel

When the Italo-Turkish War began on 29 September 1911, she was flagship of the 4th Division of the 2nd Squadron of the Mediterranean Fleet, commanded by Rear Admiral Paolo Thaon di Revel, and was one of the ships that bombarded Tripoli on 3–4 October. Giuseppe Garibaldi was the first ship to enter the harbor after the conclusion of the bombardment when a small landing party entered Fort Hamidiye and disabled the breech mechanisms of the fort's guns. The desultory bombardment killed 12 Ottoman soldiers and severely wounded 23 more in addition to 7 dead civilians. On 13 October, the three sisters sailed to Augusta, Sicily to recoal. The ship andVarese were in Tobruk in January 1912 while the bulk of the fleet was refitting in Italy.

Giuseppe Garibaldi and Francesco Ferruccio bombarded Beirut on 24 February 1912, setting the elderly Ottoman ironclad Avnillâh on fire. Giuseppe Garibaldi later entered the harbor and torpedoed the ironclad, sinking it and killing two officers and 40 enlisted men. Her entry forced the torpedo boat Ankara to scuttle itself. Varese is sometimes credited with participating also in the bombardment. (Note: Sources are contradictory about which ships performed the bombardment. Gardiner & Gray credit Garibaldi and Varese in the histories of the two Ottoman ships, but also says that all three sisters were present. Silverstone also credits all three ships, but the consensus is that it was Garibaldi and Ferruccio.) The bombardment killed over 140 civilians and wounded more than 200. On 18 April, Giuseppe Garibaldi and Varese bombarded the fortifications at the Dardanelles, heavily damaging them. After returning to Italy later that month, the ship began a refit that lasted through mid-June that included replacing her worn-out guns.

After the end of the First Balkan War in May 1913, Giuseppe Garibaldi was deployed to the Albanian port of Scutari to ensure that it was returned by Montenegro to the Ottoman Empire and to protect Italian interests in the city. She returned home in August before deploying to Benghazi in February–March 1914.

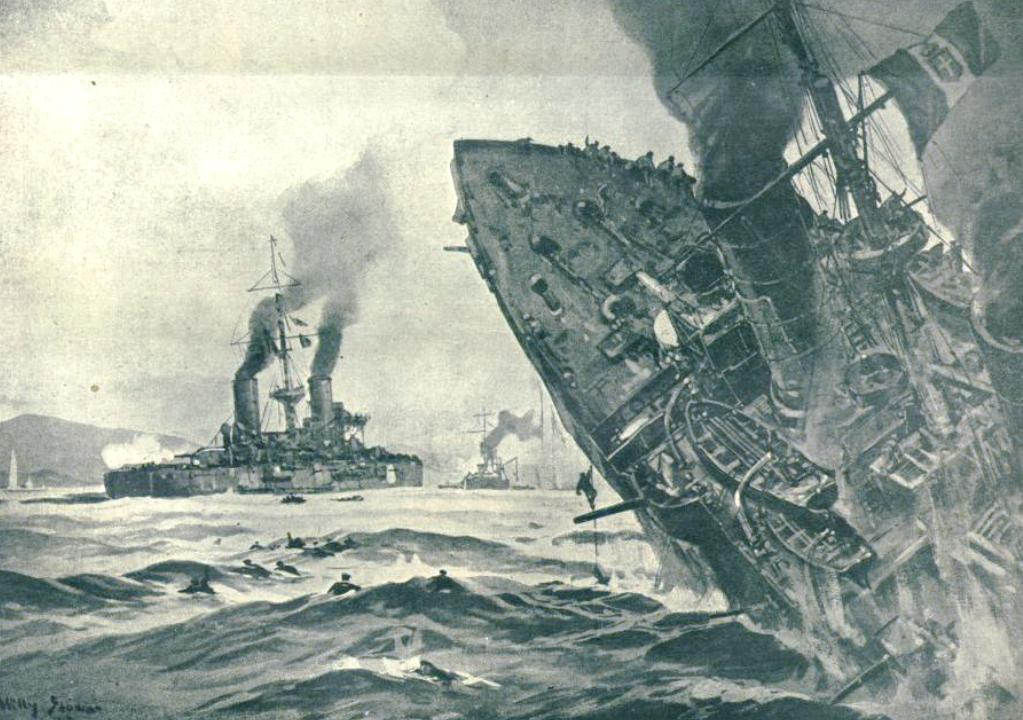
An Austro-Hungarian propaganda poster depicting the sinking

When Italy declared war on the Central Powers in May 1915, she was the flagship of the 5th Cruiser Division, commanded by Rear Admiral Eugenio Trifari, and based at Brindisi. On 5 June the division bombarded rail lines near Ragusa, modern Dubrovnik, and departed Brindisi on the evening of 17 July to do the same near Ragusa Vecchia the following morning. Shortly after beginning the bombardment at 04:00, Giuseppe Garibaldi was struck by one torpedo, on the starboard side near the aft boiler rooms, fired by the Austro-Hungarian submarine U-4. She sank within minutes on an even keel, although only 53 crewmen were killed. The remaining 525 were rescued by three destroyers left behind to rescue survivors as the division immediately retreated to avoid further attacks.

The wreck of the Giuseppe Garibaldi is upside-down and located at coordinates 42°28.362′N 18°16.758′E south-east of Dubrovnik, Croatia, at the depth of 122 meters (400 ft). The wreck was initially located by a Czech expedition in 2008 although the death of one diver on 9 September forestalled any investigation of the wreck. The group also lacked any permits to dive on Giuseppe Garibaldi as it is a protected war grave which caused them to be expelled from the country. A follow-up Croatian expedition explored and filmed the wreck in August 2009 using CCR (Closed Circuit Rebreather) technology. Official expeditions were made in November 2009 and May 2010 to the wreck by an international team of underwater archaeologists.

== Bibliography ==
- Beehler, William Henry (1913). The History of the Italian-Turkish War: September 29, 1911, to October 18, 1912. Annapolis, Maryland: United States Naval Institute.
- Chesneau, Roger & Kolesnik, Eugene M., eds. (1979). Conway's All the World's Fighting Ships 1860–1905. Greenwich: Conway Maritime Press. ISBN 0-8317-0302-4.
- Curtis, W. D. (1907). The Log of H.M.S. Cumberland, 2nd Cruiser Squadron, 1904–1906. The Log Series. Westminster, UK: The Westminster Press (Gerrards Ltd.).
- Fraccaroli, Aldo (1970). Italian Warships of World War I. London: Ian Allan. ISBN 978-0-7110-0105-3.
- Freivogel, Zvonimir (2012). Jordan, John (ed.). The Loss of the Giuseppe Garibaldi. Warship 2012. London: Conway. pp. 40–51. ISBN 978-1-84486-156-9.
- Gardiner, Robert & Gray, Randal, eds. (1985). Conway's All the World's Fighting Ships 1906–1921. Annapolis, Maryland: Naval Institute Press. ISBN 0-85177-245-5.
- Langensiepen, Bernd; Güleryüz, Ahmet (1995). The Ottoman Steam Navy 1828–1923. London: Conway Maritime Press. ISBN 978-0-85177-610-1.
- Marchese, Giuseppe (June 1995). "La Posta Militare della Marina Italiana 6^ puntata". La Posta Militare (70). Archived from the original on 2015-02-16.
- "Professional Notes–Italy". Proceedings of the United States Naval Institute. XXXI, 4 (116). Annapolis, Maryland: United States Naval Institute: 1004–05. December 1905.
- Silverstone, Paul H. (1984). Directory of the World's Capital Ships. New York: Hippocrene Books. ISBN 0-88254-979-0.
- Sondhaus, Lawrence (2001). Naval Warfare, 1815–1914. London: Routledge. ISBN 978-0-415-21478-0.
- Stephenson, Charles (2014). A Box of Sand: The Italo-Ottoman War 1911–1912: The First Land, Sea and Air War. Ticehurst, UK: Tattered Flag Press. ISBN 978-0-9576892-7-5.
- United States Office of Naval Intelligence, United States Navy (July 1901). "Steam Trials–Italy". Notes on Naval Progress (XX). Washington, D.C.: Government Printing Office.
