= Italian cruiser Varese =

Italian Giuseppe Garibaldi-class cruiser

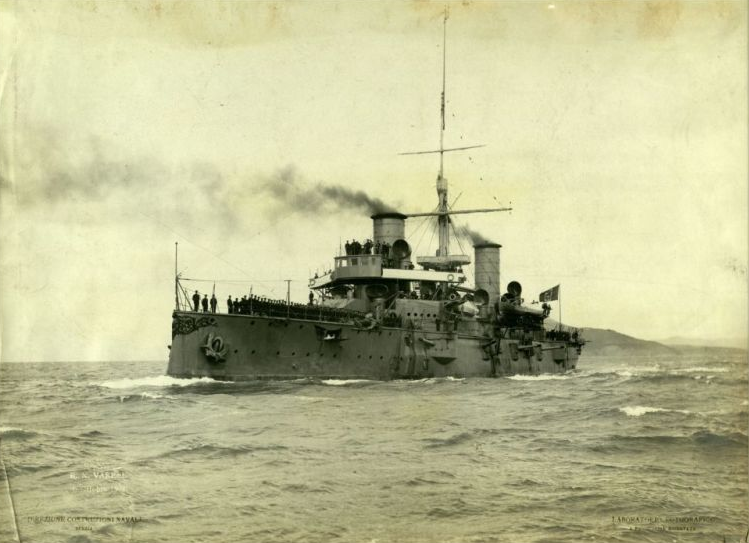
- Varese in October 1904

History

Kingdom of Italy
- Name: Varese
- Namesake: Battle of Varese
- Builder: Cantiere navale fratelli Orlando, Livorno
- Laid down: 21 April 1898
- Launched: 6 August 1899
- Completed: 5 April 1901
- Reclassified: As training ship, 1920
- Stricken: 4 January 1923

General characteristics
- Class & type: Giuseppe Garibaldi-class armored cruiser
- Displacement: 7,350 metric tons (7,234 long tons)
- Length: 111.8 m (366 ft 10 in)
- Beam: 18.2 m (59 ft 9 in)
- Draft: 7.3 m (23 ft 11 in)
- Installed power: 13,500 ihp (10,100 kW); 24 Belleville boilers
- Propulsion: 2 Shafts; 2 Vertical triple-expansion steam engines
- Speed: 20 knots (37 km/h; 23 mph)
- Range: 5,500 nmi (10,200 km; 6,300 mi) at 10 knots (19 km/h; 12 mph)
- Complement: 555 officers and enlisted men; (578 as flagship)
- Armament: 1 × single 254 mm (10 in) gun; 1 × twin 203 mm (8 in) guns; 14 × single 152 mm (6 in) guns; 10 × single 76 mm (3 in) guns; 6 × single 47 mm (1.9 in) guns; 4 × single 450 mm (17.7 in) torpedo tubes
- Armor: Belt: 80–150 mm (3.1–5.9 in); Deck: 38 mm (1.5 in); Gun turrets: 150 mm; Conning tower: 150 mm; Gun shields: 50 mm (2.0 in)

Varese was a Giuseppe Garibaldi-class armored cruiser built for the Royal Italian Navy (Regia Marina) in the 1890s. The ship made several deployments to the Eastern Mediterranean and the Levant before the start of the Italo-Turkish War of 1911–12. She supported ground forces in the occupations of Tripoli and Homs in Libya. Varese may have bombarded Beirut and did bombard the defenses of the Dardanelles during the war. She also provided naval gunfire support for the Italian Army in Libya. During World War I, the ship's activities were limited by the threat of Austro-Hungarian submarines and Varese became a training ship in 1920. She was struck from the naval register in 1923 and subsequently scrapped.

== Design and description ==
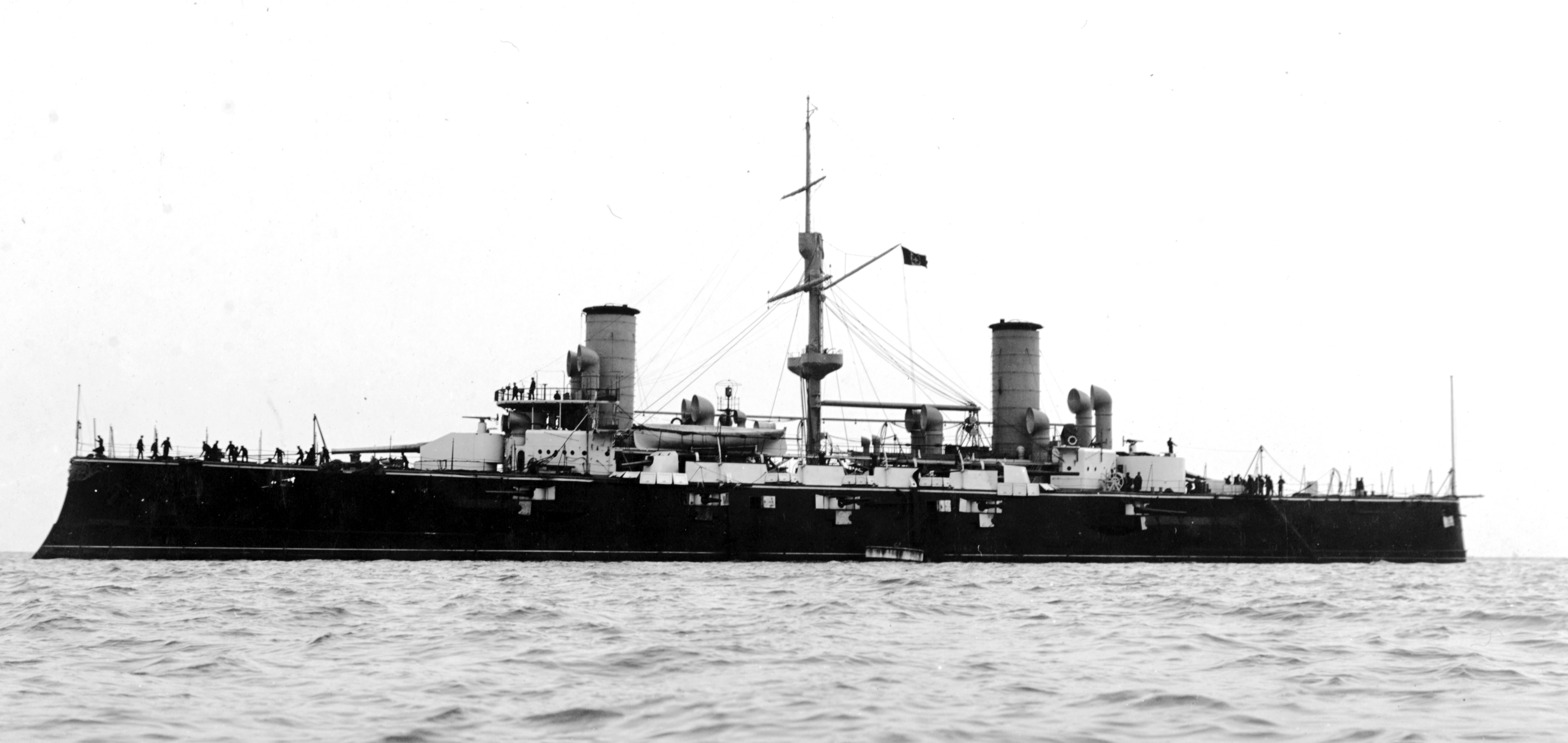
Varese soon after completion, circa 1900

Varese had an overall length of 111.8 meters (366 ft 10 in), a beam of 18.2 meters (59 ft 9 in) and a deep draft of 7.3 meters (23 ft 11 in). She displaced 7,350 metric tons (7,230 long tons) at normal load. The ship was powered by two vertical triple-expansion steam engines, each driving one shaft, using steam from 24 coal-fired Belleville boilers. The engines were rated 13,500 indicated horsepower (10,100 kW) and designed to give a speed of approximately 20 knots (37 km/h; 23 mph). During her sea trials on 27 November 1900, Varese barely exceeded her designed speed, reaching 20.02 knots from 14,200 ihp (10,600 kW). She had a cruising range of 5,500 nautical miles (10,200 km; 6,300 mi) at 10 knots (19 km/h; 12 mph). Her complement ordinarily consisted of 555 officers and enlisted men and 578 when acting as a flagship.

Her main armament consisted of one 254-millimeter (10 in) gun in a turret forward of the superstructure and two 203-millimeter (8 in) guns in a twin turret aft. Ten of the 152-millimeter (6 in) guns that comprised her secondary armament were arranged in casemates amidships; the remaining four 152-millimeter guns were mounted on the upper deck. Varese also had ten 76-millimeter (3 in) and six 47-millimeter (1.9 in) guns to defend herself against torpedo boats. She was fitted with four single 450-millimeter (17.7 in) torpedo tubes.

The ship's waterline armor belt had a maximum thickness of 150 millimeters (5.9 in) amidships and tapered to 80 millimeters (3.1 in) towards the ends of the ship. The conning tower, casemates, and gun turrets were also protected by 150-millimeter armor. Her protective deck armor was 37 millimeters (1.5 in) thick and the 152-millimeter guns on the upper deck were protected by gun shields 50 millimeters (2.0 in) thick.

== Construction and service ==
Varese, named after the Battle of Varese during the Second Italian War of Independence, was laid down by Orlando at their shipyard in Livorno on 24 January 1898, launched on 6 August 1899 and completed on 5 April 1901. The ship made port visits to Algiers on 14 September 1903 and Barcelona on 4 April 1904. During the 1905 fleet maneuvers, she was assigned to the "hostile" force blockading La Maddalena, Sardinia. Varese was present in Athens during the Intercalated Olympic Games in April 1906. Together with her sister ships Francesco Ferruccio and Giuseppe Garibaldi, the ship was in Marseille, France on 15–16 September 1906 to participate in a fleet review for Armand Fallières, President of France, on the latter date. Under the command of Prince Luigi Amedeo, Duke of the Abruzzi, Varese was present at the Jamestown Exposition in May 1907. The ship was assigned to the Levant from 1 October 1909 to 20 February 1910 and then based at Suda Bay, Crete from 23 August to 20 September 1911.

When the Italo-Turkish War began on 29 September 1911, Varese assigned to the 4th Division of the 2nd Squadron of the Mediterranean Fleet, together with her sisters Giuseppe Garibaldi and Francesco Ferruccio. While her sisters bombarded Tripoli on 3–4 October, Varese appears to have been deployed seaward to provide security for the Italians. On 13 October, the three sisters sailed to Augusta, Sicily to recoal. The ship escorted two troop transports and a hospital ship on her return voyage several days later. On 16 October, she escorted a troop convoy to Homs and bombarded the town after the Ottoman commander refused to surrender. Bad weather prevented any landings until 21 October and the ship continued to provide fire support for the Italian troops.

Varese and Giuseppe Garibaldi were in Tobruk in January 1912 while the bulk of the fleet was refitting in Italy. Varese is sometimes credited with participating in the bombardment of Beirut on 24 February 1912, but it seems most probable that this was done by her sisters Francesco Ferruccio and Giuseppe Garibaldi. (Note: Sources are contradictory about which ships performed the bombardment. Gardiner & Gray credit Garibaldi and Varese in the histories of the two Ottoman ships, but also says that all three sisters were present. Silverstone also credits all three ships, but the consensus is that it was Garibaldi and Ferruccio.) On 18 April Varese and Giuseppe Garibaldi bombarded the fortifications at the entrance to the Dardanelles, heavily damaging them. After returning to Italy later that month, Varese began a refit that included replacing her worn-out guns and lasted through mid-June.

When Italy declared war on the Central Powers in May 1915, the ship was assigned to the 5th Cruiser Division, based at Brindisi. On 5 June the division bombarded rail lines near Ragusa and departed Brindisi on the evening of 17 July to do the same near Ragusa Vecchia the following morning. Shortly after beginning the bombardment at 04:00, Giuseppe Garibaldi was torpedoed by the Austro-Hungarian submarine U-4; one torpedo passed between Varese and Giuseppe Garibaldi. Struck by a single torpedo, the cruiser sank within minutes, although only 53 crewmen were killed. The division immediately retreated to avoid further attacks, leaving three destroyers behind to rescue survivors. The loss of Giuseppe Garibaldi and the sinking of the armored cruiser Amalfi by another submarine on 7 July severely restricted the activities of the other ships based at Venice.

On 15 May 1917, as the Austro-Hungarian Fleet was preparing to attack the Otranto Barrage that blocked the exit from the Adriatic Sea, Varese was at the port of Butrino on the north coast of Corfu. She did not, however, sortie in response to the Austro-Hungarian movements. She became a cadet training ship from 1920 to 1922. She was stricken on 4 January 1923 and scrapped.

== Bibliography ==
- Beehler, William Henry (1913). The History of the Italian-Turkish War: September 29, 1911, to October 18, 1912. Annapolis, Maryland: United States Naval Institute.
- Chesneau, Roger & Kolesnik, Eugene M., eds. (1979). Conway's All the World's Fighting Ships 1860–1905. Greenwich: Conway Maritime Press. ISBN 0-8317-0302-4.
- Curtis, W. D. (1907). The Log of H.M.S. Cumberland, 2nd Cruiser Squadron, 1904–1906. The Log Series. Westminster, UK: The Westminster Press (Gerrards Ltd.).
- Freivogel, Zvonimir (2012). Jordan, John (ed.). The Loss of the Giuseppe Garibaldi. Warship 2012. London: Conway. pp. 40–51. ISBN 978-1-84486-156-9.
- Gardiner, Robert & Gray, Randal, eds. (1985). Conway's All the World's Fighting Ships 1906–1921. Annapolis, Maryland: Naval Institute Press. ISBN 0-85177-245-5.
- Halpern, Paul (2004). The Battle of the Otranto Straits: Controlling the Gateway to the Adriatic in World War I. Bloomington, Indiana: Indiana University Press. ISBN 0-253-34379-8.
- Halpern, Paul S. (1994). A Naval History of World War I. Annapolis, Maryland: Naval Institute Press. ISBN 1-55750-352-4.
- Langensiepen, Bernd; Güleryüz, Ahmet (1995). The Ottoman Steam Navy 1828–1923. London: Conway Maritime Press. ISBN 978-0-85177-610-1.
- Marchese, Giuseppe (February 1996). "La Posta Militare della Marina Italiana 9^ puntata". La Posta Militare (72).
- "Professional Notes–Italy". Proceedings of the United States Naval Institute. XXXI, 4 (116). Annapolis, Maryland: United States Naval Institute: 1004–05. December 1905.
- Silverstone, Paul H. (1984). Directory of the World's Capital Ships. New York: Hippocrene Books. ISBN 0-88254-979-0.
- Sondhaus, Lawrence (1994). The Naval Policy of Austria-Hungary, 1867–1918: Navalism, Industrial Development, and the Politics of Dualism. West Lafayette, Indiana: Purdue University Press. ISBN 978-1-55753-034-9. OCLC 59919233.
- Sondhaus, Lawrence (2001). Naval Warfare, 1815–1914. London: Routledge. ISBN 978-0-415-21478-0.
- Stephenson, Charles (2014). A Box of Sand: The Italo-Ottoman War 1911–1912: The First Land, Sea and Air War. Ticehurst, UK: Tattered Flag Press. ISBN 978-0-9576892-7-5.
- United States Office of Naval Intelligence, United States Navy (July 1901). "Steam Trials–Italy". Notes on Naval Progress (XX). Washington, D.C.: Government Printing Office: 137.
- Yarsinske, Amy Waters (1999). Jamestown Exposition: American Imperialism on Parade. Vol. I. Charleston, South Carolina: Arcadia Publishing. ISBN 0-7385-0102-6.
