= Italian cruiser Francesco Ferruccio =

Italian Giuseppe Garibaldi-class cruiser

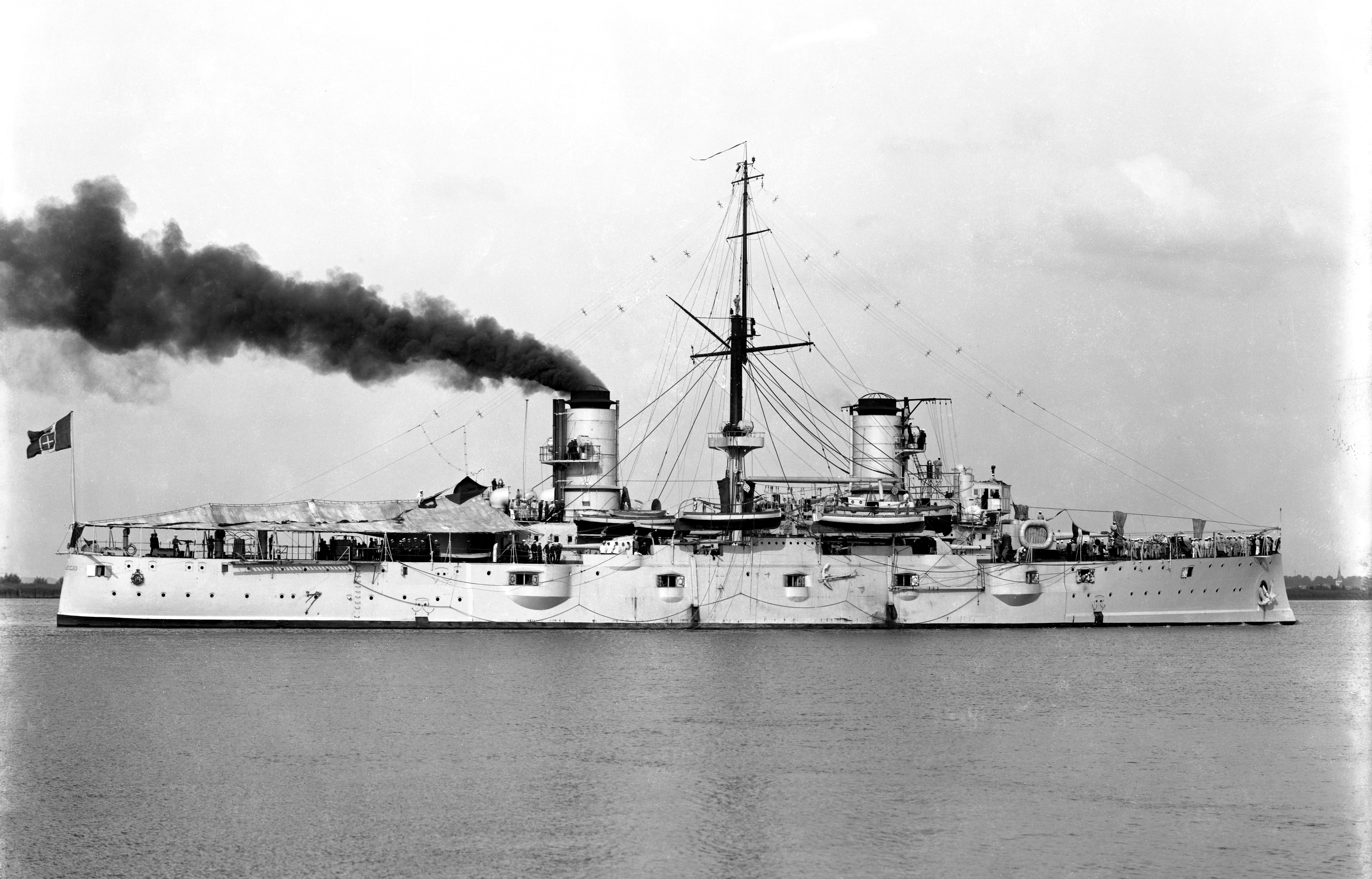
- Francesco Ferruccio, probably in the Scheldt

History

Kingdom of Italy
- Name: Francesco Ferruccio
- Namesake: Francesco Ferruccio
- Builder: Venetian Arsenal
- Laid down: 19 August 1899
- Launched: 23 April 1902
- Christened: Isabella, Duchess of Genoa
- Completed: 1 September 1905
- Reclassified: As training ship, 1919
- Stricken: 1 April 1930
- Identification: by 1914: call sign IHZ
- Motto: "Let us go where our fortune and that of our country call us"
- Fate: Scrapped

General characteristics
- Class & type: Giuseppe Garibaldi-class armored cruiser
- Displacement: 7,350 metric tons (7,234 long tons)
- Length: 111.8 m (366 ft 10 in)
- Beam: 18.2 m (59 ft 9 in)
- Draft: 7.3 m (23 ft 11 in)
- Installed power: 14,000 ihp (10,000 kW); 24 Belleville boilers
- Propulsion: 2 Shafts; 2 Vertical triple-expansion steam engines
- Speed: 19–20 knots (35–37 km/h; 22–23 mph)
- Range: 5,500 nmi (10,200 km; 6,300 mi) at 10 knots (19 km/h; 12 mph)
- Complement: 555 officers and enlisted men; (578 as flagship)
- Armament: 1 × single 254 mm (10 in) gun; 1 × twin 203 mm (8 in) guns; 14 × single 152 mm (6 in) guns; 10 × single 76 mm (3 in) guns; 6 × single 47 mm (1.9 in) guns; 4 × single 450 mm (17.7 in) torpedo tubes
- Armor: Belt: 80–150 mm (3.1–5.9 in); Deck: 38 mm (1.5 in); Gun turrets: 150 mm; Conning tower: 150 mm; Gun shields: 50 mm (2.0 in)

Francesco Ferruccio was a Giuseppe Garibaldi-class armored cruiser built for the Royal Italian Navy (Regia Marina) in the first decade of the 20th century. The ship made several deployments to the Eastern Mediterranean and the Levant during her career. At the beginning of the Italo-Turkish War of 1911–12 she bombarded Tripoli and then Beirut in early 1912 before being transferred to Libya. During World War I, Francesco Ferruccio's activities were limited by the threat of Austro-Hungarian submarines and she became a training ship in 1919. The ship was struck from the naval register in 1930 and subsequently scrapped.

== Design and description ==
Francesco Ferruccio had an overall length of 111.8 meters (366 ft 10 in), a beam of 18.2 meters (59 ft 9 in) and a deep draft of 7.3 meters (23 ft 11 in). She displaced 7,350 metric tons (7,230 long tons) at normal load. The ship was powered by two vertical triple-expansion steam engines, each driving one shaft, using steam from 24 coal-fired Belleville boilers. The engines produced 14,000 indicated horsepower (10,000 kW) and gave a speed of approximately 19–20 knots (35–37 km/h; 22–23 mph). She had a cruising range of 5,500 nautical miles (10,200 km; 6,300 mi) at 10 knots (19 km/h; 12 mph). Her complement ordinarily consisted of 555 officers and enlisted men and 578 when acting as a flagship.

Her main armament consisted of one 254-millimeter (10 in) gun in a turret forward of the superstructure and two 203-millimeter (8 in) guns in a twin turret aft. Ten of the 152-millimeter (6 in) guns that comprised her secondary armament were arranged in casemates amidships; the remaining four 152-millimeter guns were mounted on the upper deck. Francesco Ferruccio also had ten 76-millimeter (3 in) and six 47-millimeter (1.9 in) guns to defend herself against torpedo boats. She was fitted with four single 450-millimeter (17.7 in) torpedo tubes.

The ship's waterline armor belt had a maximum thickness of 150 millimeters (5.9 in) amidships and tapered to 80 millimeters (3.1 in) towards the ends of the ship. The conning tower, casemates, and gun turrets were also protected by 150-millimeter armor. Her protective deck armor was 37 millimeters (1.5 in) thick and the 152-millimeter guns on the upper deck were protected by gun shields 50 millimeters (2.0 in) thick.

== Construction and service ==
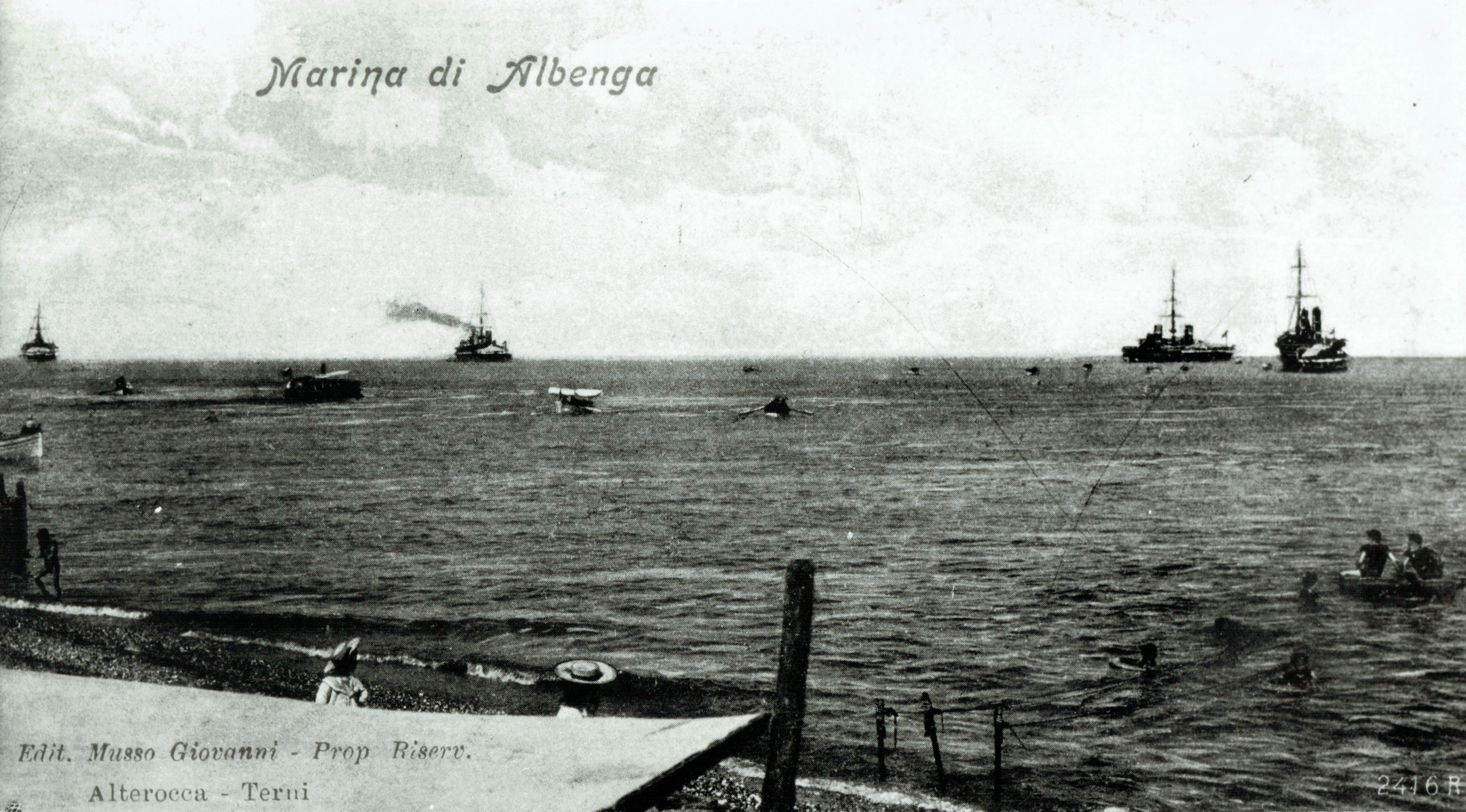
Ferruccio on duty, 3-4 August 1906

Francesco Ferruccio, named after the condottiere Francesco Ferruccio, was laid down at the Naval Dockyard in Venice on 19 August 1899 and launched on 23 April 1902, when she was named by the Duchess of Genoa. She was completed on 1 September 1905. During the 1905 fleet maneuvers, she was assigned to the "hostile" force blockading La Maddalena, Sardinia. Together with her sister ships Giuseppe Garibaldi and Varese, the ship was in Marseille, France on 15–16 September 1906 to participate in a fleet review for Armand Fallières, President of France, on the latter date. Francesco Ferruccio made a cruise to the Levant in July 1909 and was deployed to Crete from 26 June 1910 to January 1911, returning to Taranto on 25 January.

When the Italo-Turkish War began on 29 September 1911, Francesco Ferruccio assigned to the 4th Division of the 2nd Squadron of the Mediterranean Fleet, together with her sisters Giuseppe Garibaldi and Varese. Francesco Ferruccio and Giuseppe Garibaldi bombarded Tripoli on 3–4 October while Varese stood offshore to watch for any Ottoman ships. The desultory bombardment killed 12 Ottoman soldiers and severely wounded 23 more in addition to 7 dead civilians. On 13 October, the three sisters sailed to Augusta, Sicily to recoal. Francesco Ferruccio and Giuseppe Garibaldi bombarded Beirut on 24 February 1912, sinking the elderly Ottoman ironclad Avnillâh and forced the torpedo boat Ankara to scuttle itself. Varese is sometimes credited with participating also in the bombardment. (Note: Sources are contradictory about which ships performed the bombardment. Gardiner & Gray credit Garibaldi and Varese in the histories of the two Ottoman ships, but also says that all three sisters were present. Silverstone also credits all three ships, but the consensus is that it was Garibaldi and Ferruccio.) The bombardment killed over 140 civilians and wounded more than 200 more. The ship was then transferred to Libya and remained there for the rest of the war. During the First Balkan War, she was deployed to Albania from 18 February to 5 June 1913 and then made another deployment there from 4 January to 7 February 1914.

When Italy declared war on the Central Powers in May 1915, she was assigned to the 5th Cruiser Division, based at Brindisi. On 5 June the division bombarded rail lines near Ragusa and departed Brindisi on the evening of 17 July to do the same near Ragusa Vecchia the following morning. Shortly after beginning the bombardment at 04:00, Giuseppe Garibaldi was torpedoed by the Austro-Hungarian submarine U-4. Struck by a single torpedo, the cruiser sank within minutes, although only 53 crewmen were killed. The division immediately retreated to avoid further attacks, leaving three destroyers behind to rescue survivors. The loss of Giuseppe Garibaldi and the sinking of the armored cruiser Amalfi by another submarine on 7 July severely restricted the activities of the other ships based in the Adriatic Sea. Francesco Ferruccio was briefly stationed in the Levant from 19 November to 22 December before returning to Brindisi where she escorted convoys to Albania and patrolled the Albanian coast for the rest of the war.

Francesco Ferruccio became a cadet training ship in 1919 and finally was converted for the role in 1924. On 30 July 1922, she collided with the Spanish cargo ship Ayala Mendi in the Bay of Biscay; Ayala Mendi sank with the loss of one member of her 33-man crew.

Francesco Ferruccio was stricken on 1 April 1930 and scrapped.

== Bibliography ==
- Beehler, William Henry (1913). The History of the Italian-Turkish War: September 29, 1911, to October 18, 1912. Annapolis, MD: United States Naval Institute.
- Chesneau, Roger & Kolesnik, Eugene M., eds. (1979). Conway's All the World's Fighting Ships 1860–1905. Greenwich: Conway Maritime Press. ISBN 0-8317-0302-4.
- Curtis, W. D. (1907). The Log of H.M.S. Cumberland, 2nd Cruiser Squadron, 1904–1906. The Log Series. Westminster: The Westminster Press (Gerrards Ltd.).
- Freivogel, Zvonimir (2012). Jordan, John (ed.). The Loss of the Giuseppe Garibaldi. Warship 2012. London: Conway Maritime Press. pp. 40–51. ISBN 978-1-84486-156-9.
- Gardiner, Robert & Gray, Randal, eds. (1985). Conway's All the World's Fighting Ships 1906–1921. Annapolis, MD: Naval Institute Press. ISBN 0-85177-245-5.
- Halpern, Paul S. (1994). A Naval History of World War I. Annapolis, MD: Naval Institute Press. ISBN 1-55750-352-4.
- Langensiepen, Bernd; Güleryüz, Ahmet (1995). The Ottoman Steam Navy 1828–1923. London: Conway Maritime Press. ISBN 978-0-85177-610-1.
- Marchese, Giuseppe (June 1995). "La Posta Militare della Marina Italiana 6^ puntata". La Posta Militare (70). Archived from the original on 2015-02-16.
- The Marconi Press Agency Ltd (1914). The Year Book of Wireless Telegraphy and Telephony. London: The Marconi Press Agency Ltd.
- "Professional Notes–Italy". Proceedings of the United States Naval Institute. XXXI, 4 (116). Annapolis, MD: United States Naval Institute: 1004–05. December 1905.
- Silverstone, Paul H. (1984). Directory of the World's Capital Ships. New York: Hippocrene Books. ISBN 0-88254-979-0.
- Sondhaus, Lawrence (1994). The Naval Policy of Austria-Hungary, 1867–1918: Navalism, Industrial Development, and the Politics of Dualism. West Lafayette, IN: Purdue University Press. ISBN 978-1-55753-034-9. OCLC 59919233.
- Sondhaus, Lawrence (2001). Naval Warfare, 1815–1914. London: Routledge. ISBN 978-0-415-21478-0.
- Stephenson, Charles (1914). A Box of Sand: The Italo-Ottoman War 1911–1912: The First Land, Sea and Air War. Ticehurst, UK: Tattered Flag Press. ISBN 978-0-9576892-7-5.
