= ARA Pueyrredón =

Argentinian Navy armored cruiser

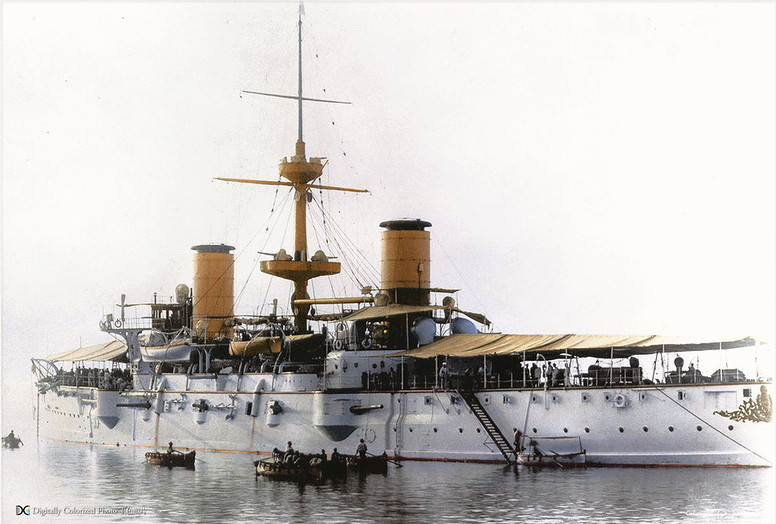
- Colorized photo of Pueyrredón at anchor before 1922

History

Argentina
- Name: Pueyrredón
- Namesake: Juan Martín de Pueyrredón
- Builder: Gio. Ansaldo & C., Genoa
- Launched: 25 September 1897
- Completed: August 1898
- Acquired: 1897
- Stricken: 2 August 1954
- Fate: Sold for scrap, 1957

General characteristics
- Class & type: Giuseppe Garibaldi-class armored cruiser
- Displacement: 8,000 t (7,900 long tons) (deep load)
- Length: 106.7 m (350 ft 1 in)
- Beam: 18.2 m (59 ft 9 in)
- Draft: 7.6 m (25 ft)
- Installed power: 13,000 ihp (9,700 kW); 16 Belleville boilers
- Propulsion: 2 Shafts; 2 Vertical triple-expansion steam engines
- Speed: 19 knots (35 km/h; 22 mph)
- Range: 6,000 nautical miles (11,000 km; 6,900 mi) at 10 knots (19 km/h; 12 mph)
- Complement: 325
- Armament: 2 × single 254 mm (10 in) guns; 10 × single 152 mm (6 in) guns; 6 × single 120 mm (4.7 in) guns; 10 × single 57 mm (2.2 in) Hotchkiss guns; 10 × single 37 mm (1.5 in) Hotchkiss guns; 4 × 1 - 457 mm (18 in) torpedo tubes
- Armor: Belt: 80–150 mm (3.1–5.9 in); Barbettes: 150 mm (5.9 in); Gun turrets: 150 mm (5.9 in); Conning tower: 150 mm (5.9 in)

ARA Pueyrredón was one of four Giuseppe Garibaldi-class armored cruisers purchased by the Argentine Navy from Italy in the 1890s.

== Design and description ==
Pueyrredón had an overall length of 344 feet 2 inches (104.9 m), a beam of 50 feet 8 inches (15.4 m), and a mean draft of 23 feet 4 inches (7.1 m). She displaced 6,773 metric tons (6,666 long tons) at normal load. The ship was powered by two vertical triple-expansion steam engines, each driving one shaft, using steam from eight Scotch marine boilers. The engines were designed for a maximum output of 13,000 indicated horsepower (9,700 kW) and a speed of 20 knots (37 km/h; 23 mph). She had a cruising range of 6,000 nautical miles (11,000 km; 6,900 mi) at 10 knots (19 km/h; 12 mph). Her complement consisted of 25 officers and 300 enlisted men.

Her main armament consisted of two 40-caliber Armstrong Whitworth 10-inch (254 mm) guns, in gun turrets fore and aft of the superstructure. The ten 40-caliber quick-firing (QF) 6-inch (152 mm) guns that comprised her secondary armament were arranged in casemates amidships on the main deck. Pueyrredón also had six QF 4.7-inch (119 mm), four QF 6-pounder Hotchkiss and ten QF 3-pounder Hotchkiss guns to defend herself against torpedo boats. She was also equipped with four above-water 457 mm (18.0 in) torpedo tubes, two on each side.

The ship's waterline armor belt had a maximum thickness of 5.9 inches (150 mm) amidships and tapered to 3.1 inches (79 mm) towards the ends of the ship. Between the main gun barbettes it covered the entire side of the ship up to the level of the upper deck. The barbettes, the conning tower, and gun turrets were also protected by 5.9-inch armor. Her deck armor ranged from 1 to 2 inches (25 to 51 mm) thick.

== Construction and career ==
The ship was launched on 27 July 1898 and served the Argentine Navy until she was stricken on 2 August 1954. Pueyrredón was the last survivor of the Garibaldi class.
