= Giuseppe Garibaldi-class cruiser =

1895 class of Italian armored cruisers

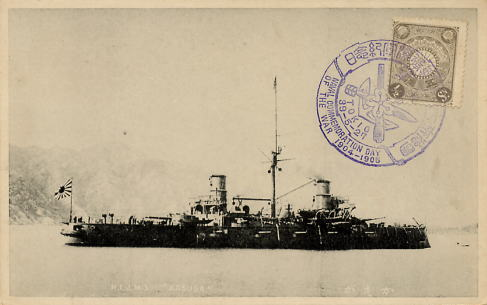
- Armoured cruiser Kasuga in 1900

Class overview
- Name: Giuseppe Garibaldi
- Builders: Gio. Ansaldo & C.; Cantiere navale fratelli Orlando
- Operators: Argentine Navy; Regia Marina; Imperial Japanese Navy; Spanish Navy
- Preceded by: Vettor Pisani class
- Succeeded by: Pisa class
- Subclasses: Garibaldi; Giuseppe Garibaldi
- Built: 1895–1904
- In commission: 1896–1954
- Planned: 11
- Completed: 10
- Canceled: 1
- Lost: 3
- Scrapped: 7

General characteristics
- Type: Armored cruiser
- Displacement: 6,840 t (6,732 long tons) Garibaldi; 7,400–7,700 t (7,283–7,578 long tons) Giuseppe Garibaldi
- Length: 108.8 m (356 ft 11 in) w/l; 111.73 m (366 ft 7 in) o/a
- Beam: 18.9 m (62 ft 0 in)
- Draught: 7.32 m (24 ft 0 in)
- Installed power: 13,000–13,500 ihp (9,700–10,100 kW); 8–24 Boilers
- Propulsion: 2 Shafts; 2 Triple-expansion steam engines
- Speed: 20 knots (37 km/h; 23 mph)
- Range: 5,500 nmi (10,200 km; 6,300 mi) at 10 knots (19 km/h; 12 mph)
- Complement: 555 officers and enlisted men; (578 as flagship)
- Armament: 2 gun turrets, each with; 1 × 254 mm (10 in) gun or 2 × 203 mm (8 in) guns; 10–14 × single 152 mm (6 in) guns; 0–6 × single 120 mm (4.7 in) guns; 10 × single 76 mm (3 in) guns; 6 × single 47 mm (1.9 in) guns; 4 × single 450 mm (17.7 in) torpedo tubes
- Armour: Waterline belt: 70–150 mm (2.8–5.9 in); Deck: 20–40 mm (0.79–1.57 in); Barbette: 100–150 mm (3.9–5.9 in); Conning tower: 150 mm (5.9 in)

The Giuseppe Garibaldi-class cruisers were a class of ten armoured cruisers built in Italy in the 1890s and the first decade of the 20th century. The ships were built for both the Royal Italian Navy (Regia Marina) and for export. The class was named for Italian unifier and nationalist Giuseppe Garibaldi.

== Design and description ==
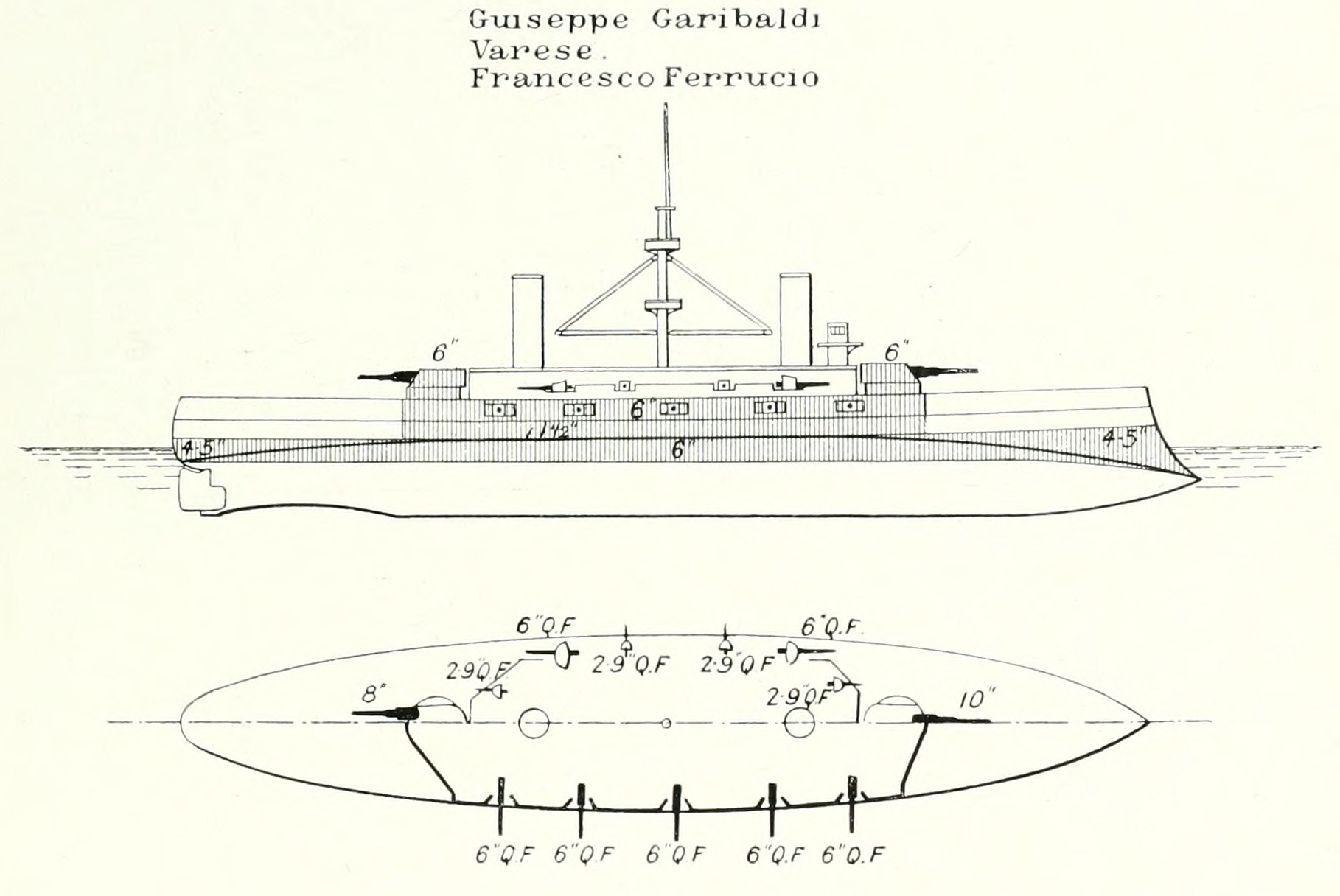
Right elevation and deck plan as depicted in Brassey's Naval Annual 1902

The design of the Giuseppe Garibaldi-class cruiser was derived by the naval architect Edoardo Masdea from his earlier Vettor Pisani-class design. The Garibaldis were slightly larger and about a knot faster than their predecessors, but the primary improvement was the addition of two gun turrets, one each fore and aft of the superstructure. These remedied a major weakness of the older ships in that their primary armament, being on the broadside, could not engage targets that were directly in front or behind. The design was so popular that ten cruisers were purchased by four different countries; the Royal Italian Navy, the Argentine Navy, the Imperial Japanese Navy, and the Spanish Navy. As might be expected over a group of ships that was built from 1892 to 1903, design improvements and more modern equipment were incorporated over time so that only the three ships actually accepted by Italy were true sisters.

The first five ships were built to the same measurements, and form the Garibaldi sub-class, but the last five were stretched by six frames amidships, and comprise the Giuseppe Garibaldi sub-class. The ships of the first group had an overall length of 106.94 meters (350 ft 10 in), a beam of 18.2 meters (59 ft 9 in) and a deep draft of 7.1 meters (23 ft 4 in). They displaced 6,840 metric tons (6,730 long tons) at normal load. The second ship purchased by Argentina, General Belgrano, is reported by some sources to have had a beam of 18.8 meters (61 ft 8 in) and therefore displaced some 300–400 metric tons (300–390 long tons) more than the others.

The class was unusual in that they did not have a uniform main armament. Some had single 10-inch (254 mm) Elswick Pattern R guns in gun turrets fore and aft; others (including Kasuga) had a mixed armament of a single 10-inch (254 mm) gun in one turret and another turret with twin 8-inch (203 mm) guns. A third variation (including Nisshin) was a uniform armament of four 8-inch (203 mm) guns in twin gun turrets fore and aft. Cristobal Colon was fitted with 10-inch guns which the Spanish admiralty claimed were defective and which were removed before it was delivered. Therefore, it only went to battle with 10 smokeless powder Armstrong six inch guns mounted in the hull (5 on each side).

== Ships ==
All ships were built by Gio. Ansaldo & C. in Genoa-Sestri Ponente, except ARA San Martin and ARA Belgrano which were subcontracted to Orlando in Livorno.

Construction data
Ship	Launched	Notes
Argentina
Garibaldi	27 May 1895	Originally constructed by Ansaldo as Giuseppe Garibaldi before sale to Argentina. Decommissioned, 20 March 1934
General Belgrano	25 July 1896	Laid down at Orlando as Varese but sold to Argentina. Decommissioned, 8 May 1947
Pueyrredón	25 September 1898	Built by Ansaldo Originally Giuseppe Garibaldi to replace previous then sold to Argentina. Decommissioned, 2 August 1954
San Martín	25 May 1896	Built at Orlando. Named Varese but sold to Argentina. Decommissioned, 18 December 1935
Italy
Francesco Ferruccio	23 April 1902	Converted to training ship 1924 for naval academy at Leghorn. Decommissioned, 1 April 1930
Giuseppe Garibaldi	29 June 1899	Sunk, 18 July 1915, by Austro-Hungarian submarine SM U-4
Varese	6 August 1899	Laid down April 1898, completed April 1901. Converted to training ship 1920. Decommissioned, 4 January 1923
Japan
Kasuga	22 October 1902	Laid down as Mitra, during construction sold to Argentina as Rivadavia but not delivered. Sold to Japan in 1904 and named Kasuga Disarmed 1920s under Washington Naval Treaty, sunk by bombing 18 July 1945
Nisshin	9 February 1903	Laid down as Roca, renamed Moreno before sale to Japan at end of 1903. Disarmed 1920s, scuttled 1936. Later raised and expended as a target ship, sunk by the battleship Yamato, 18 January 1942
Spain
Cristobal Colon	September 1896	Constructed as Giuseppe Garibaldi. Bought by Spain May 1896. Delivered at Genoa May 1897. Sank 3 July 1898 while salvage attempted after being run aground and surrendered during the Battle of Santiago de Cuba.
Pedro de Aragon	Cancelled, never built	

== Construction and service ==
In addition, Spain was planning to acquire a second Garibaldi-class cruiser, to be named Pedro de Aragon. These plans were shelved after the Spanish–American War and the subsequent downsizing of the Spanish Armada.

Two of the Italian ships ordered in 1902 were sold to the Argentine Navy before completion as the Mitre and Roca; they were renamed as the Rivadavia and the Mariano Moreno. The Argentines in turn sold them to the Imperial Japanese Navy before final completion in 1904, and they were renamed the Kasuga and Nisshin.

== Gallery ==
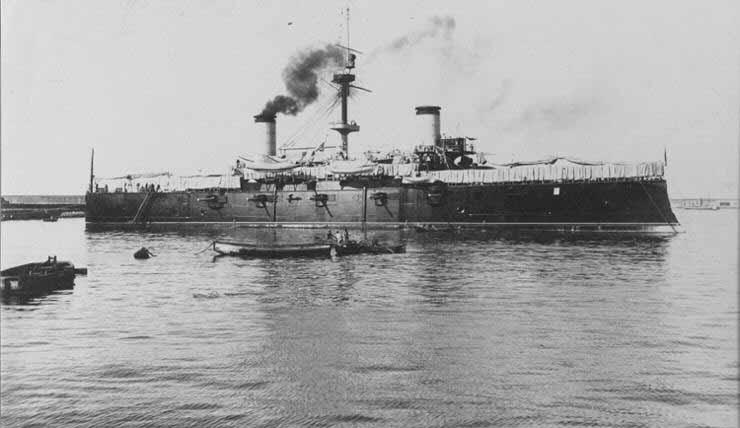
Spanish cruiser Cristobal Colon

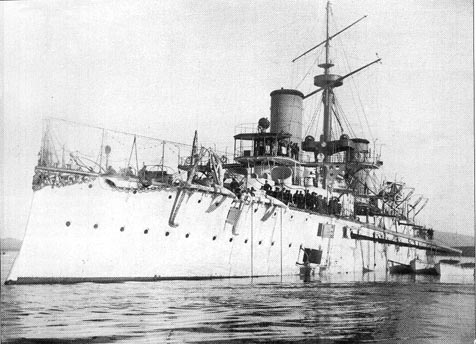
ARA Garibaldi

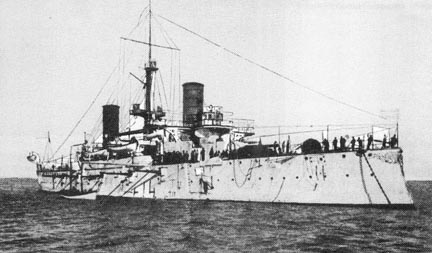
ARA Belgrano

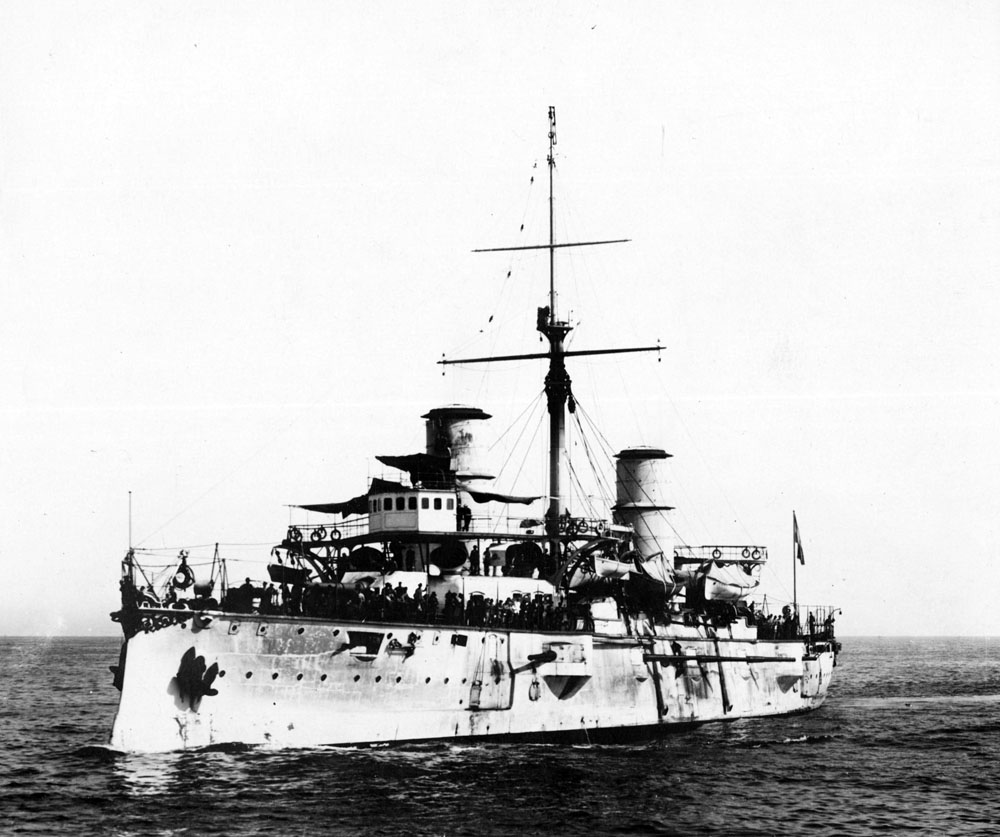
ARA Pueyrredon

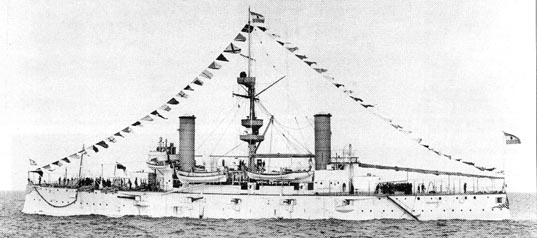
ARA San Martin

== Bibliography ==
- Beehler, William Henry (1913). The History of the Italian-Turkish War: September 29, 1911, to October 18, 1912. Annapolis, Maryland: United States Naval Institute.
- Chesneau, Roger & Kolesnik, Eugene M., eds. (1979). Conway's All the World's Fighting Ships 1860–1905. Greenwich: Conway Maritime Press. ISBN 0-8317-0302-4.
- Cowan, Mark and Sumrall, Alan "Old Hoodoo" The Battleship Texas, America's First Battleship (1895-1911) 2011
- Curtis, W. D. (1907). The Log of H.M.S. Cumberland, 2nd Cruiser Squadron, 1904–1906. The Log Series. Westminster, UK: The Westminster Press (Gerrards Ltd.).
- Fraccaroli, Aldo (1970). Italian Warships of World War I. London: Ian Allan. ISBN 978-0-7110-0105-3.
- Freivogel, Zvonimir (2012). Jordan, John (ed.). The Loss of the Giuseppe Garibaldi. Warship 2012. London: Conway. pp. 40–51. ISBN 978-1-84486-156-9.
- Gardiner, Robert & Gray, Randal, eds. (1985). Conway's All the World's Fighting Ships 1906–1921. Annapolis, Maryland: Naval Institute Press. ISBN 0-85177-245-5.
- Langensiepen, Bernd; Güleryüz, Ahmet (1995). The Ottoman Steam Navy 1828–1923. London: Conway Maritime Press. ISBN 978-0-85177-610-1.
- Marchese, Giuseppe (June 1995). "La Posta Militare della Marina Italiana 6^ puntata". La Posta Militare (70). Archived from the original on 2015-02-16.
- "Professional Notes–Italy". Proceedings of the United States Naval Institute. XXXI, 4 (116). Annapolis, Maryland: United States Naval Institute: 1004–05. December 1905.
- Silverstone, Paul H. (1984). Directory of the World's Capital Ships. New York: Hippocrene Books. ISBN 0-88254-979-0.
- Soliani, Colonel N. (1905). "The Armoured Cruisers Kasuga and Nisshin of the Imperial Japanese Navy". Transactions of the Institution of Naval Architects. XLVII (Part I). London: Henry Sotheran & Co.: 43–59.
- Sondhaus, Lawrence (2001). Naval Warfare, 1815–1914. London: Routledge. ISBN 978-0-415-21478-0.
- Stephenson, Charles (2014). A Box of Sand: The Italo-Ottoman War 1911–1912: The First Land, Sea and Air War. Ticehurst, UK: Tattered Flag Press. ISBN 978-0-9576892-7-5.
- United States Office of Naval Intelligence, United States Navy (July 1901). "Steam Trials–Italy". Notes on Naval Progress (XX). Washington, D.C.: Government Printing Office.
