= ARA Buenos Aires (1895) =

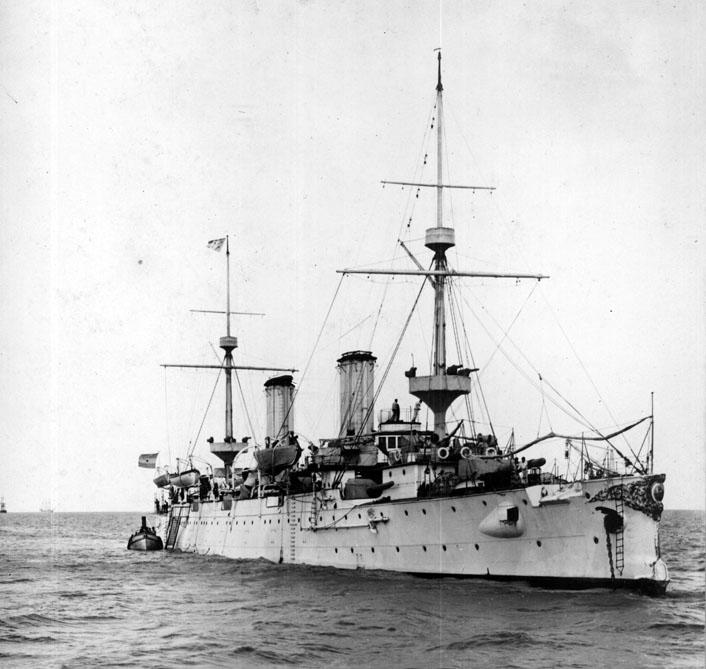

History

Argentina
- Name: ARA Buenos Aires
- Builder: Armstrong, Mitchell and Co., Elswick
- Laid down: February 1893
- Launched: 10 May 1895
- Completed: February 1896

General characteristics
- Type: Protected cruiser
- Displacement: 4,788 long tons (4,865 t)
- Length: 396 ft (121 m) pp 424 ft (129 m) oa
- Beam: 46 ft 6 in (14.17 m)
- Draught: 17 ft 4 in (5.28 m)
- Installed power: 14,000 ihp (10,000 kW) (natural draught)
- Propulsion: Two vertical triple expansion steam engines; 8 cylindrical boilers; 2 shafts
- Speed: 23.2 kn (26.7 mph; 43.0 km/h)
- Complement: 400
- Armament: 2× 8 in (203 mm)/45 guns (2×1); 4× 6 in (152 mm)/45 QF guns (4×1); 6× 4.7 in (119 mm)/45 QF guns (6×1); 16× 3-pounder (47 mm) guns; 6× QF 1-pounder pom-pom
- Armour: Deck:5–1 1/2 in (127–38 mm); Gunshields:4 1/2 in (110 mm); Conning tower:6 in (152 mm)

ARA Buenos Aires (Note: ARA stands for Armada de la Republica Argentina.) was a protected cruiser of the Argentine Navy. It was built by the British shipyard of Armstrong Mitchell and Co, being launched in 1895 and completing in 1896. Buenos Aires continued in use until 1932.

== Construction ==
In February 1893, Armstrong and Mitchell laid down a protected cruiser (Yard No. 612) at its Elswick, Newcastle upon Tyne shipyard as a stock ship (i.e. without an order from a customer). The ship soon found a buyer, with Argentina, involved in dispute with Chile over the border between the two nations in Patagonia, purchasing the ship on 27 November 1893, and named it Buenos Aires.

Buenos Aires was launched on 10 May 1895, and underwent steaming trials on 2 November 1895, reaching an average speed of 23.202 knots (26.700 mph; 42.970 km/h) over a period of six hours with natural draught, making it the fastest cruiser in the world. Gunnery trials followed on 29 November that year. The ship was completed in February 1896, and reaching Argentina on 29 April 1896.

== Design ==
Buenos Aires was of similar design to the Chilean cruiser Blanco Encalada, the previous protected cruiser built by Armstrong and Mitchell, but with a modified armament. Buenos Aires's hull had an overall length of 424 feet (129 m), and a length between perpendiculars of 396 feet (121 m). It had a beam of 46 feet 6 inches (14.17 m) and a draught of 17 feet 4 inches (5.28 m). Like Blanco Encalada, Buenos Aires had a flush deck layout, and its hull was wood and copper sheathed to reduce fouling. The ship displaced 4,788 long tons (4,865 t).

The ship was powered by two 4-cylinder triple-expansion steam engines fed by eight horizontal return tube boilers and driving two propeller shafts. This machinery was designed to give 12,500 indicated horsepower (9,300 kW) with natural draught and 17,000 indicated horsepower (13,000 kW) under forced draught, but managed to generate 14,000 indicated horsepower (10,000 kW) under natural draught during trials.

The ship's main armament consisted of two 8 inch (203 mm) /45 calibre guns (compared to the 40 calibre guns fitted to Blanco Encalada), mounted fore and aft behind shields on the ship's centreline. These guns could fire 210 pounds (95 kg) or 250 pounds (113 kg) shells at a velocity of 2,650 feet per second (810 m/s) and 2,480 feet per second (760 m/s) respectively at a rate of fire of up to four rounds per gun per minute. Secondary armament consisted of a mixed battery of four 6 inch (152 mm) /45 calibre and six 4.7 inch (120 mm) /45 calibre quick-firing guns, (compared to the ten 6 inch /40 calibre guns mounted on Blanco Encalada) which could fire 100 pounds (45 kg) and 45 pounds (20 kg) shells at a rate of 7 rounds per minute and 10 rounds per minute respectively. Tertiary armament consisted of sixteen three-pounder (47 mm) guns, while six QF 1-pounder pom-pom automatic guns were mounted on the ship's fighting tops. Five 18 inch torpedo tubes were fitted, one fixed in the box and four on the ship's broadside.

As a protected cruiser, the ship's main protective armour was a sloping armoured deck of steel, with thickness of between 5 inches (130 mm) and 1 1/2 inches (38 mm), with the ship's conning tower protected by 6 inches (150 mm) armour and the gunshields 4 1/2 inches (110 mm) thick.

== Operational history ==
After arriving in Argentina, Buenos Aires joined the 1st Division of the fleet. The ship settled into a routine of naval exercises, interspersed with use as a survey ship. In 1906, the ship returned to the United Kingdom for refurbishment of its armament, while in 1911, it again returned to Britain to participate in the Fleet review at Spithead to celebrate the coronation of King George V.

In 1926, Buenos Aires transported a four-man Spanish Air Force crew which included Major Ramón Franco and copilot/navigator Captain Julio Ruiz de Alda Miqueleiz from Argentina to a hero's welcome in Spain. Between 22 January and 10 February 1926, the aviators had made a seven-stop, 6,300-mile (10,145-kilometer) flight of just under 51 hours from Spain to Buenos Aires in the Dornier Do J Wal ("Whale") flying boat Plus Ultra ("Farther Still").

Buenos Aires was stricken on 17 May 1932, and sold for scrapping in 1935.

== Notes and references ==
=== References ===
- Brassey, T.A. (1897). The Naval Annual 1897. Griffin and Co.
- Brooke, Peter (1999). Warships for Export: Armstrong Warships 1867–1927. World Ship Society. ISBN 0-905617-89-4.
- "Firing Trials of Elswick Cruiser Buenos Aires" (PDF). The Engineer. Vol. 80. 13 December 1895. p. 593.
- Lyon, Hugh (1979). "Argentina". In Chesneau, Roger & Kolesnik, Eugene M. (eds.). Conway's All the World's Fighting Ships 1860–1905. Conway Maritime Press. pp. 401–404. ISBN 0-85177-133-5.
- "Speed Trials of the New Argentine Cruiser — Buenos Aires" (PDF). The Engineer. Vol. 80. 8 November 1895. p. 464.
- "The Argentine Cruiser Buenos Aires" (PDF). The Engineer. Vol. 82. 31 July 1896. pp. 106, 114.

== See also ==
- List of cruisers
- List of ships of the Argentine Navy
