= ARA San Martín =

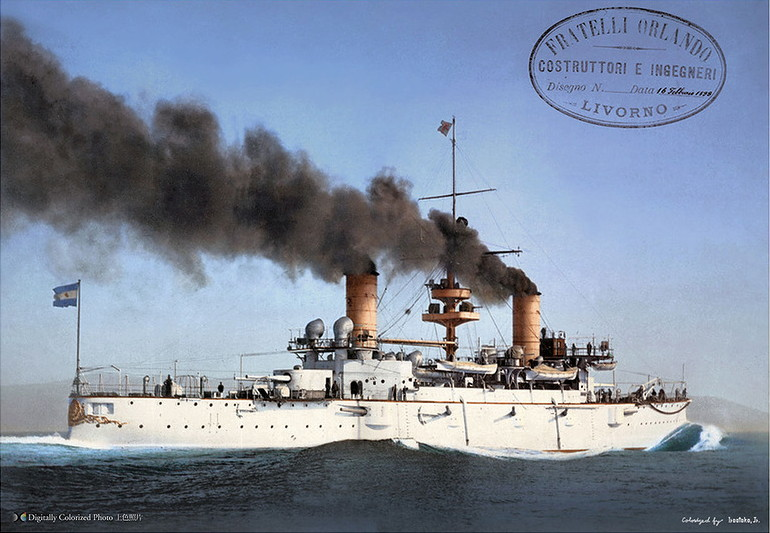
- Colorized photo of San Martin on her sea trials

History

Argentina
- Name: San Martin
- Namesake: José de San Martín
- Builder: Cantiere navale fratelli Orlando, Livorno
- Launched: 25 May 1896
- Acquired: October 1896
- Stricken: 18 December 1935
- Fate: Scrapped, 1947

General characteristics (as built)
- Class & type: Giuseppe Garibaldi-class armored cruiser
- Displacement: 8,100 t (8,000 long tons) (deep load)
- Length: 106.7 m (350 ft 1 in)
- Beam: 16.2 m (53 ft 2 in)
- Draft: 7.6 m (25 ft)
- Installed power: 13,000 ihp (9,700 kW); 8 cylindrical boilers
- Propulsion: 2 Shafts; 2 Vertical triple-expansion steam engines
- Speed: 18 knots (33 km/h; 21 mph)
- Range: 6,000 nautical miles (11,000 km; 6,900 mi) at 10 knots (19 km/h; 12 mph)
- Complement: 488
- Armament: 2 × twin 203 mm (8 in) guns; 10 × single 152 mm (6 in) guns; 6 × single 120 mm (4.7 in) guns; 10 × single 57 mm (2.2 in) Hotchkiss guns; 8 × single 37 mm (1.5 in) Maxim guns; 4 × 1 - 457 mm (18 in) torpedo tubes
- Armor: Belt: 80–150 mm (3.1–5.9 in); Barbettes: 150 mm (5.9 in); Gun turrets: 150 mm (5.9 in); Conning tower: 150 mm (5.9 in)

ARA San Martín was one of four Giuseppe Garibaldi-class armored cruisers purchased by the Argentine Navy from Italy.

== Design and description ==
San Martín had an overall length of 344 feet 2 inches (104.9 m), a beam of 50 feet 8 inches (15.4 m), and a mean draft of 23 feet 4 inches (7.1 m). She displaced 6,773 metric tons (6,666 long tons) at normal load. The ship was powered by two vertical triple-expansion steam engines, each driving one shaft, using steam from eight Scotch marine boilers. The engines were designed for a maximum output of 13,500 indicated horsepower (10,100 kW) and a speed of 20 knots (37 km/h; 23 mph). She had a cruising range of 6,000 nautical miles (11,000 km; 6,900 mi) at 10 knots (19 km/h; 12 mph). Her complement consisted of 28 officers and 460 enlisted men.

Her main armament consisted of four 45-caliber Armstrong Whitworth 8-inch (203 mm) guns, in twin-gun turrets fore and aft of the superstructure. The ten 40-caliber quick-firing (QF) 6-inch (152 mm) guns that comprised her secondary armament were arranged in casemates amidships on the main deck. San Martín also had six QF 4.7-inch (119 mm) and six QF 6-pounder Hotchkiss guns to defend herself against torpedo boats. She was also equipped with four above-water 457 mm (18.0 in) torpedo tubes, two on each side.

The ship's waterline armor belt had a maximum thickness of 5.9 inches (150 mm) amidships and tapered to 3.1 inches (79 mm) towards the ends of the ship. Between the main gun barbettes it covered the entire side of the ship up to the level of the upper deck. The barbettes, the conning tower, and gun turrets were also protected by 5.9-inch armor. Her deck armor ranged from 1 to 2 inches (25 to 51 mm) thick.

== Construction and career ==
The ship was launched on 25 May 1896 and was stricken from the Navy List on 18 December 1935.
