= ARA Garibaldi =

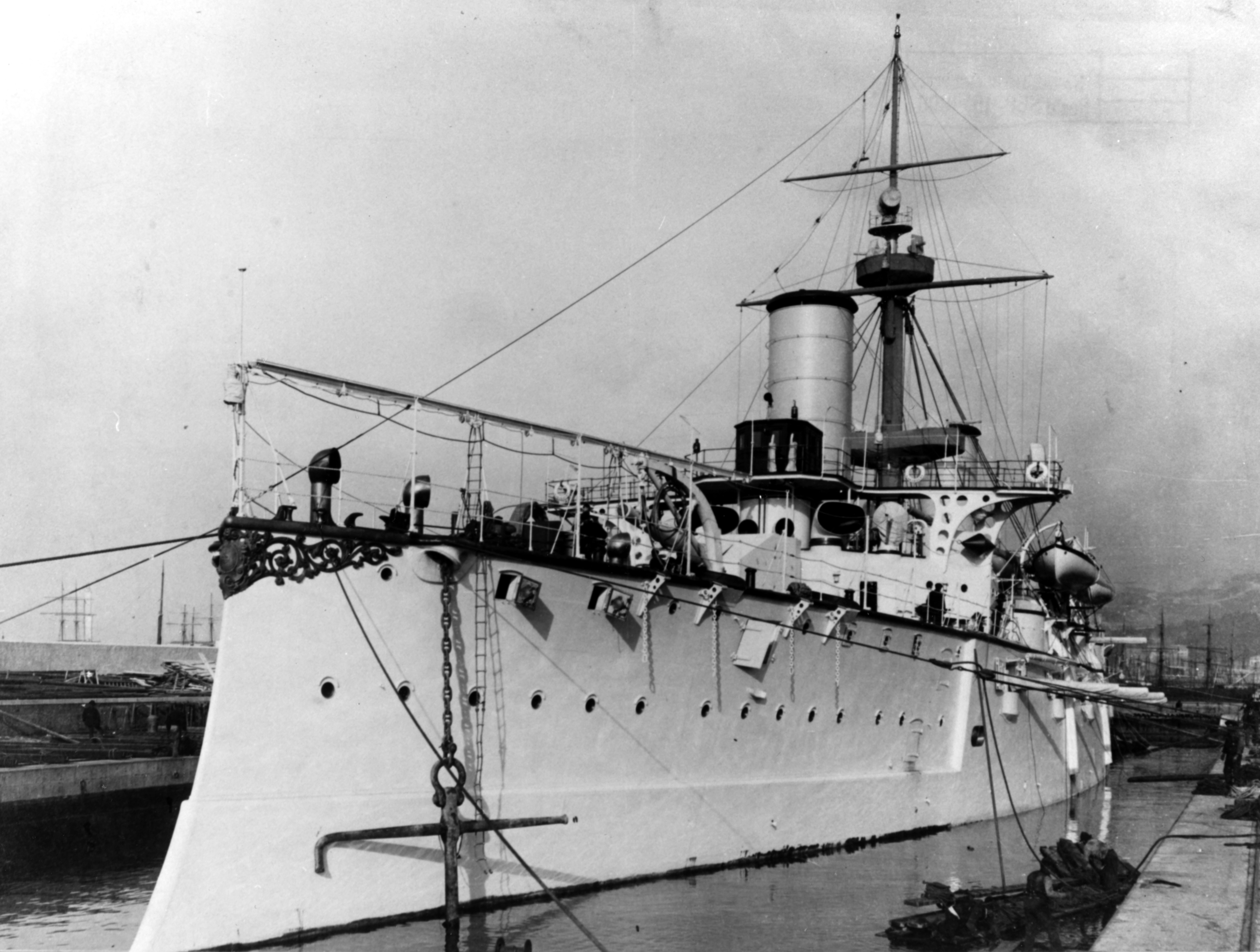
- Garibaldi

History

Argentina
- Name: Garibaldi
- Namesake: Giuseppe Garibaldi
- Builder: Gio. Ansaldo & C., Genoa
- Launched: 27 May 1895
- Acquired: 14 July 1895
- Reclassified: Training ship, 1920
- Fate: Sold for scrap, 5 November 1936

General characteristics
- Class & type: Giuseppe Garibaldi-class armored cruiser
- Displacement: 6,840 t (6,730 long tons)
- Length: 106.3 m (348 ft 9 in)
- Beam: 18.2 m (59 ft 9 in)
- Draft: 7.1 m (23 ft 4 in)
- Installed power: 13,000 ihp (9,700 kW); 8 cylindrical boilers
- Propulsion: 2 Shafts; 2 Vertical triple-expansion steam engines
- Speed: 20 knots (37 km/h; 23 mph)
- Range: 6,000 nautical miles (11,000 km; 6,900 mi) at 10 knots (19 km/h; 12 mph)
- Complement: 448
- Armament: 2 × single 254 mm (10 in) guns; 10 × single 152 mm (6 in) guns; 6 × single 120 mm (4.7 in) guns; 10 × single 57 mm (2.2 in) Hotchkiss guns; 8 × single 37 mm (1.5 in) Maxim guns; 4 × 1 - 457 mm (18 in) torpedo tubes
- Armor: Belt: 80–150 mm (3.1–5.9 in); Barbettes: 150 mm (5.9 in); Gun turrets: 150 mm (5.9 in); Conning tower: 150 mm (5.9 in)

ARA Garibaldi was one of four Giuseppe Garibaldi-class armored cruisers purchased by the Argentine Navy from Italy.

== Design and description ==
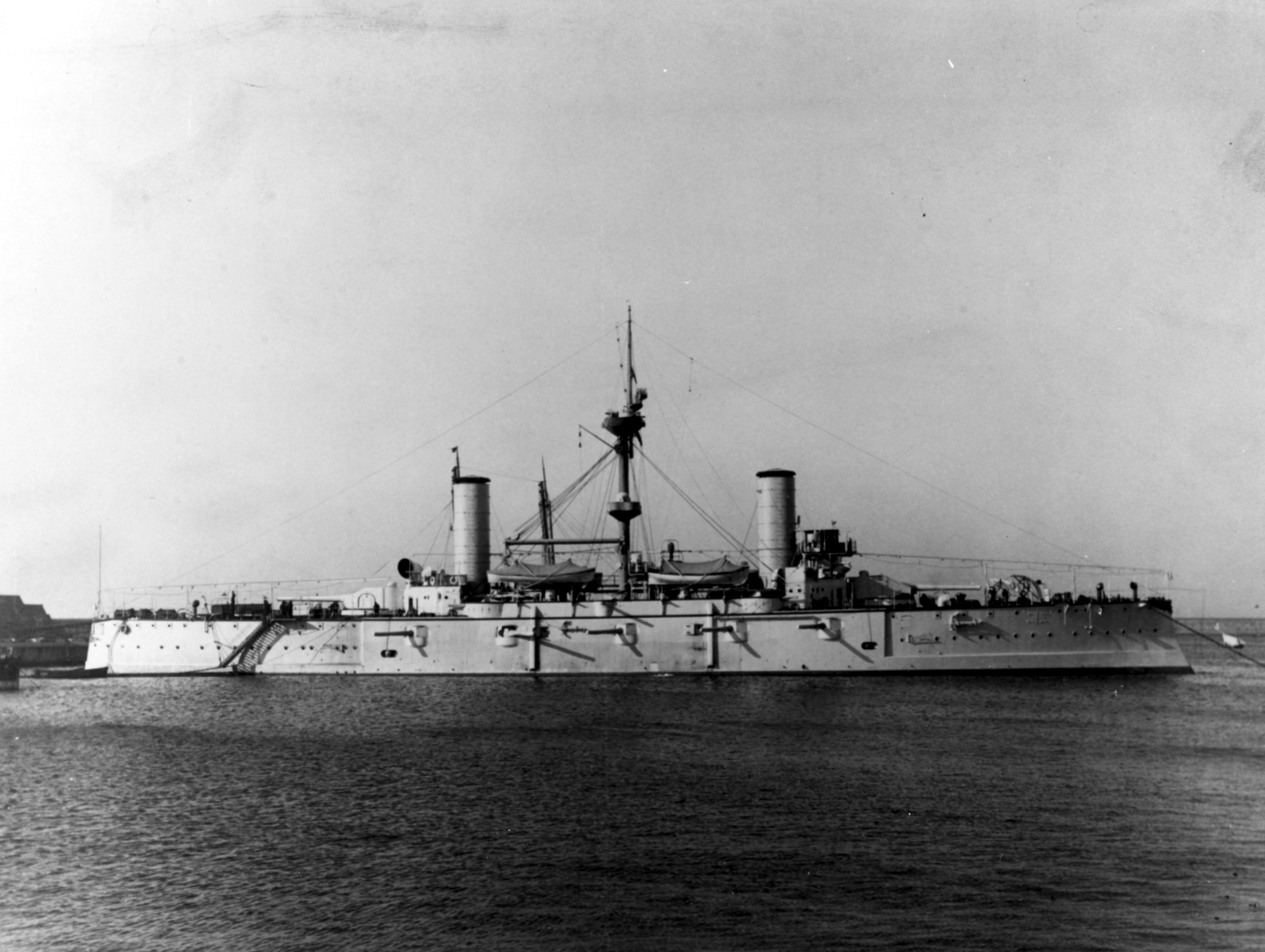
Garibaldi circa 1895

Garibaldi had an overall length of 344 feet 2 inches (104.9 m), a beam of 50 feet 8 inches (15.4 m), and a mean draft of 23 feet 4 inches (7.1 m). She displaced 6,773 metric tons (6,666 long tons) at normal load. The ship was powered by two vertical triple-expansion steam engines, each driving one shaft, using steam from eight Scotch marine boilers. The engines were designed for a maximum output of 13,000 indicated horsepower (9,700 kW) and a speed of 20 knots (37 km/h; 23 mph). She had a cruising range of 6,000 nautical miles (11,000 km; 6,900 mi) at 10 knots (19 km/h; 12 mph). Her complement consisted of 28 officers and 420 enlisted men.

Her main armament consisted of two 40-caliber Armstrong Whitworth 10-inch (254 mm) guns, in gun turrets fore and aft of the superstructure. The ten 40-caliber quick-firing (QF) 6-inch (152 mm) guns that comprised her secondary armament were arranged in casemates amidships on the main deck. Garibaldi also had six QF 4.7-inch (119 mm), ten QF 6-pounder Hotchkiss and eight QF 3-pounder Hotchkiss guns to defend herself against torpedo boats. She was also equipped with four above-water 457 mm (18.0 in) torpedo tubes, two on each side.

The ship's waterline armor belt had a maximum thickness of 5.9 inches (150 mm) amidships and tapered to 3.1 inches (79 mm) towards the ends of the ship. Between the main gun barbettes it covered the entire side of the ship up to the level of the upper deck. The barbettes, the conning tower, and gun turrets were also protected by 5.9-inch armor. Her deck armor ranged from 1 to 2 inches (25 to 51 mm) thick.

== Construction and career ==
The ship was launched on 27 May 1895 and she was stricken on 20 March 1934.
