= EOC 8 inch 45 calibre gun =

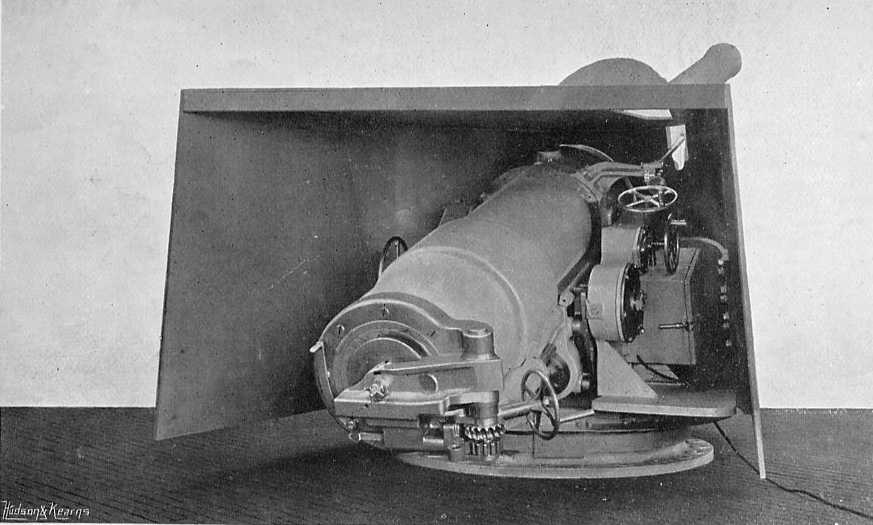
- EOC Pattern W gun
- Type: Naval gun Coastal artillery Siege artillery
- Place of origin: United Kingdom

Service history
- In service: 1896—1945
- Used by: Argentina; Chile; China; Italy; Japan; Spain
- Wars: Spanish–American War; Boxer Rebellion; Russo-Japanese War; Italo-Turkish War; World War I World War II

Production history
- Designer: Elswick Ordnance Company
- Designed: 1894
- Manufacturer: Armstrong Whitworth
- Produced: 1895
- Variants: Patterns: Q, S, U, W

Specifications
- Mass: 19 t (19 long tons)
- Length: 9.5 m (31 ft 2 in)
- Barrel length: 7.8 m (25 ft 7 in) 45 calibre
- Shell: Separate loading bagged charge and projectile
- Shell weight: 116 kg (256 lb)
- Calibre: 203 mm (8.0 in)
- Rate of fire: 2 rpm
- Muzzle velocity: 790 m/s (2,600 ft/s)
- Maximum firing range: 18 km (11 mi) at 30°

The EOC 8 inch 45 calibre gun were a family of related 8-inch (203 mm) 45 calibre long naval guns designed by the Elswick Ordnance Company and manufactured by Armstrong for export customers before World War I. In addition to being produced in the United Kingdom licensed variants were produced in Italy and in Japan. Users of this family of gun included the navies of Argentina, Chile, China, Italy, Japan and Spain. The guns saw action in the Spanish–American War, Boxer Rebellion, Russo-Japanese War, Italo-Turkish War, World War I and World War II. In addition to its naval role it was later used as coastal artillery and siege artillery after the ships it served on were decommissioned.

== History ==
The EOC 8 inch 45 calibre family of guns originated in 1894 from the Elswick Ordnance Company, the armaments company of Armstrong Whitworth, with the Pattern Q gun which was first produced for export in 1895. In addition to the Pattern Q there were S, U and W Pattern guns produced for export. Earlier Patterns A to P, R and T were shorter 35 or 40 calibre guns. While the Pattern Q, S, U and W were all 45 calibre guns. The weights and dimensions of each Pattern of gun were similar and their ammunition, bagged charges and their ballistic performance were also similar.

== Construction ==
The Armstrong Pattern Q was the first wire-wound 8 inch EOC gun. It was constructed of an inner A tube, wire wound for 10 ft 6 in (3.20 m), with a jacket shrunk over the wire. It had a single-motion breech mechanism of cylindrical-conical style with five threaded and five smooth sectors.

== Naval service ==
The Japanese 20.3 cm/45 Type 41 naval gun was based on the Pattern S guns from Armstrong first installed on Takasago in 1898 with licensed production beginning in 1902. Existing S, U and W Pattern guns were later classified as Type 41 naval guns in Japanese service. Type 41 guns were employed as coastal artillery during World War II after the ships they armed were decommissioned and disarmed. Pattern S guns also armed protected cruisers of the Argentine Navy and Chinese Navy.

=== Pattern S ===
- ARA Buenos Aires - This protected cruiser was completed in 1896 by Armstrong in Newcastle upon Tyne for the Argentinian Navy. The primary armament was two Pattern S guns mounted on single, shielded, pedestal mounts fore and aft.
- Hǎi Qí class - The two protected cruisers of the Hǎi Qí class were completed in 1899 by Armstrong for the Chinese Navy. The primary armament of the class were two Pattern S guns mounted on single, shielded, pedestal mounts fore and aft.
- Kasagi class - The two protected cruisers of the Kasagi class were built in the United States for the Imperial Japanese Navy. Kasagi was built by William Cramp & Sons in Philadelphia and completed in 1898, while Chitose was built by the Union Iron Works in San Francisco and completed in 1899. The primary armament of the class were two Pattern S guns mounted on single, shielded, pedestal mounts fore and aft.
- Takasago - This protected cruiser was completed in 1898 by Armstrong for the Imperial Japanese Navy. The primary armament was two Pattern S guns mounted on single, shielded, pedestal mounts fore and aft.

Pattern U guns from Armstrong armed both Japanese and Chilean protected and armoured cruisers.

=== Pattern U ===
- Asama class - The two armoured cruisers of the Asama class were completed in 1899 by Armstrong for the Imperial Japanese Navy. The primary armament of the class were four Pattern U guns mounted in twin gun turrets fore and aft.
- Azuma - This armored cruiser was completed in 1900 by Ateliers et Chantiers de la Loire, Saint-Nazaire, France for the Imperial Japanese Navy. The primary armament was four Pattern U guns mounted in twin gun turrets fore and aft.
- Chilean cruiser Chacabuco - This protected cruiser was the sister ship of Takasago and completed in 1902 by Armstrong for the Chilean Navy. The primary armament was two Pattern U guns mounted on single, shielded, pedestal mounts fore and aft.
- Izumo class - The two armored cruisers of the Izumo class were completed in 1900-1901 by Armstrong for the Imperial Japanese Navy. The primary armament of the class were four Pattern U guns mounted in twin gun turrets fore and aft.
- Yakumo - This armored cruiser was completed in 1900 by AG Vulcan Stettin, Stettin, Germany for the Imperial Japanese Navy. The primary armament was four Pattern U guns mounted in twin gun turrets fore and aft.

The Italian Cannone da 203/45 Modello 1897 was based on the Pattern W gun from Armstrong and licensed production began in 1897 at the Armstrong factory in Pozzuoli, Italy. The Modello 1897 guns armed ships built in Italy for the Argentinian Navy, Italian Navy, Imperial Japanese Navy and the Spanish Navy. Modello 1897 guns were later employed by the Italian Army as siege artillery during World War I and as coastal artillery during World War II after the ships they armed were decommissioned and disarmed.

=== Pattern W ===
- Giuseppe Garibaldi class :** One of the four Giuseppe Garibaldi-class armored cruisers built for the Argentinian Navy, ARA San Martín had four Pattern W guns as primary armament mounted in twin gun turrets fore and aft. The three Giuseppe Garibaldi-class armored cruisers built for the Italian Navy had a primary armament of one Armstrong Pattern R 10 inch gun in a single turret fore and two Pattern W guns mounted in twin gun turrets aft.
- There were two Kasuga-class armored cruisers built for the Imperial Japanese Navy. Kasuga had a primary armament of one Armstrong Pattern R 10-inch gun in a single turret fore and two Pattern W guns mounted in a twin gun turret aft. Nisshin had a primary armament of four Pattern W guns mounted in twin turrets fore and aft.
- The single Giuseppe Garibaldi-class armored cruiser built for the Spanish Navy, Cristóbal Colón, was designed to have a primary armament of one Armstrong Pattern R 10-inch gun in a single turret fore and two Pattern W guns mounted in a twin gun turret aft. However the 10-inch gun was found to be defective and was not installed.
- Iwami - This ship originally Oryol of the Imperial Russian Navy and was a war prize from the Russo-Japanese War. In 1907 the ship's original secondary armament of twelve 6-inch guns, mounted in twin turrets, amidships were replaced by six, single gun, shielded, pedestal mounted, Pattern W guns.
- Regina Elena class - The four semi-dreadnought battleships of this class had a secondary armament of twelve Pattern W guns, in three twin gun turrets per side, amidships.
- Regina Margherita class - The two pre-dreadnought battleships of this class had a secondary armament of four Pattern W guns mounted in casemates amidships in the ships superstructure.

== Italian Army use ==
As the First World War settled into trench warfare on the Italian Front the light field guns that the combatants went to war with were beginning to show their limitations when facing an enemy who was now dug into prepared Alpine positions. Indirect fire, interdiction and counter-battery fire emphasized the importance of long-range heavy artillery. In order to address the Italian Army's lack of long range heavy artillery surplus 203/45, 254B, 254/40, 305/17, 305/40, and 305/46 naval guns were converted to land use.

These guns were mounted on De Stefano carriages for land use and the resulting guns were classified by their size in millimeters 203, their length in calibres 45 and lastly by their carriage type DS which stood for De Stefano or 203/45 DS. The De Stefano carriage was a clever, but strange looking monstrosity which looked something like a large steel basket with the gun barrel mounted towards the rear of the carriage. The carriage was a large box-trail design with four non-steerable wheels. The wheels were fitted with detachable grousers designed by major Crispino Bonagente for traction on soft ground and was towed in one piece by a Pavesi-Tolotti artillery tractor.

When not on the move the grousers were removed and the steel wheels rode on an inclined set of steel rails when in firing position. The steel rails were mounted on a firing platform made of wooden beams which allowed the gun 360°of traverse. When the gun fired recoil which was not absorbed by the recoil mechanism was transmitted to the wheels and the carriage rolled up the inclined rails and then rolled back into firing position. The box trail carriage was tall and wide enough that the breech of the gun was accessible at high angles of elevation without a pit being dug and the gun crew had a bucket and hoist for ammunition handling.

== Gallery ==
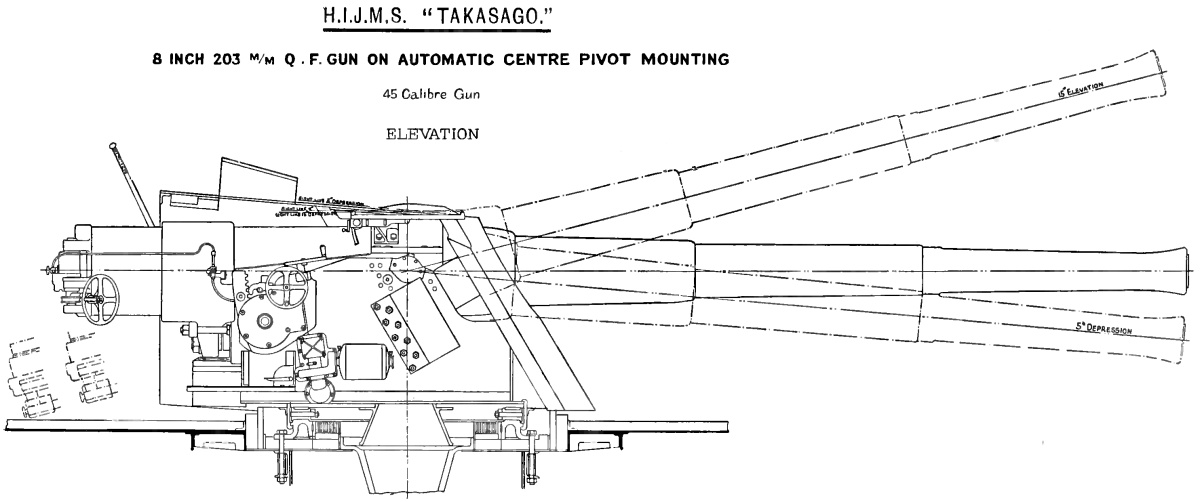
8 inch gun as installed on the cruiser Takasago.

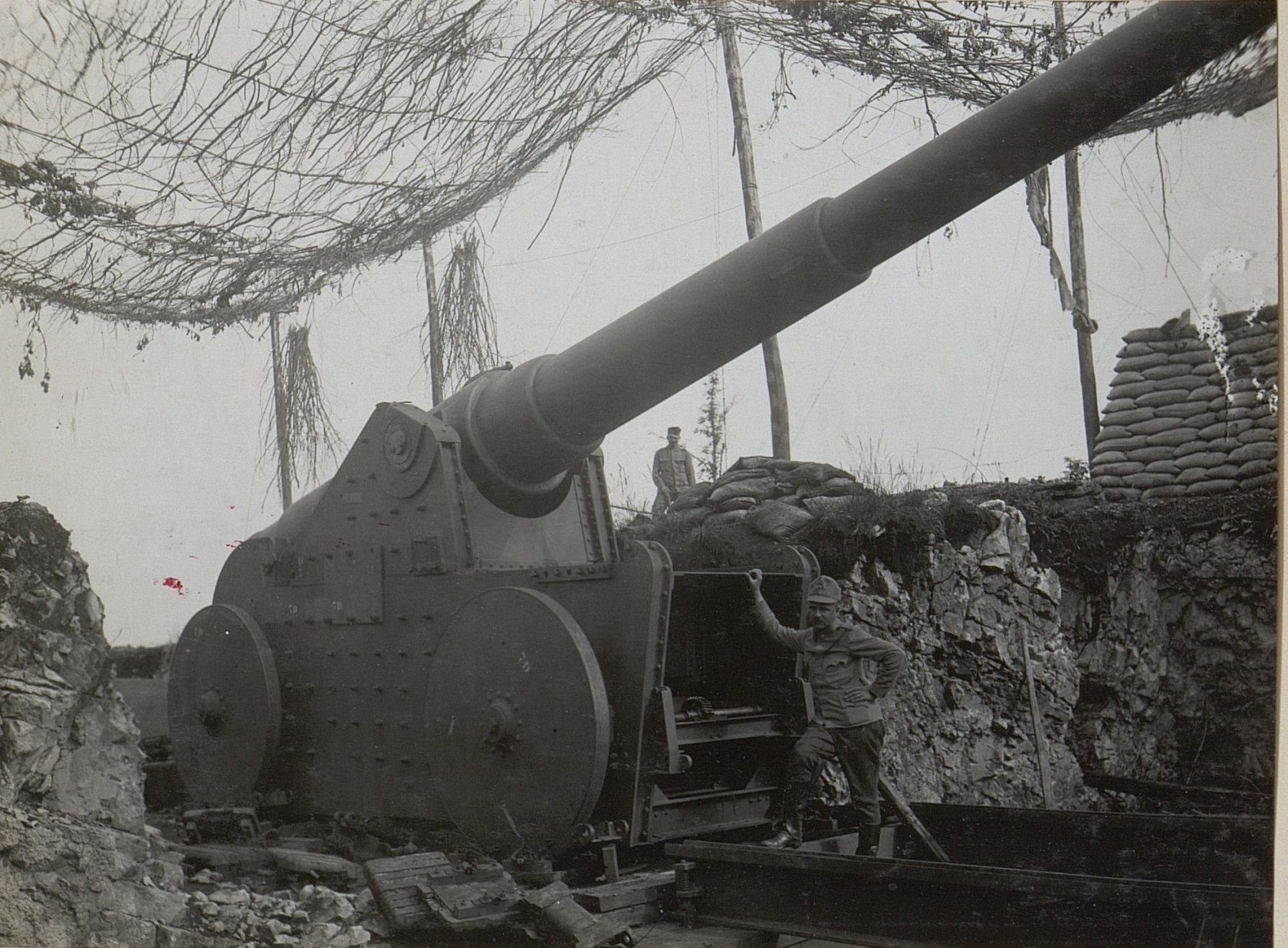
A 203/45 D.S. captured by the Austrians on the Doberdo-Plateau in 1918.

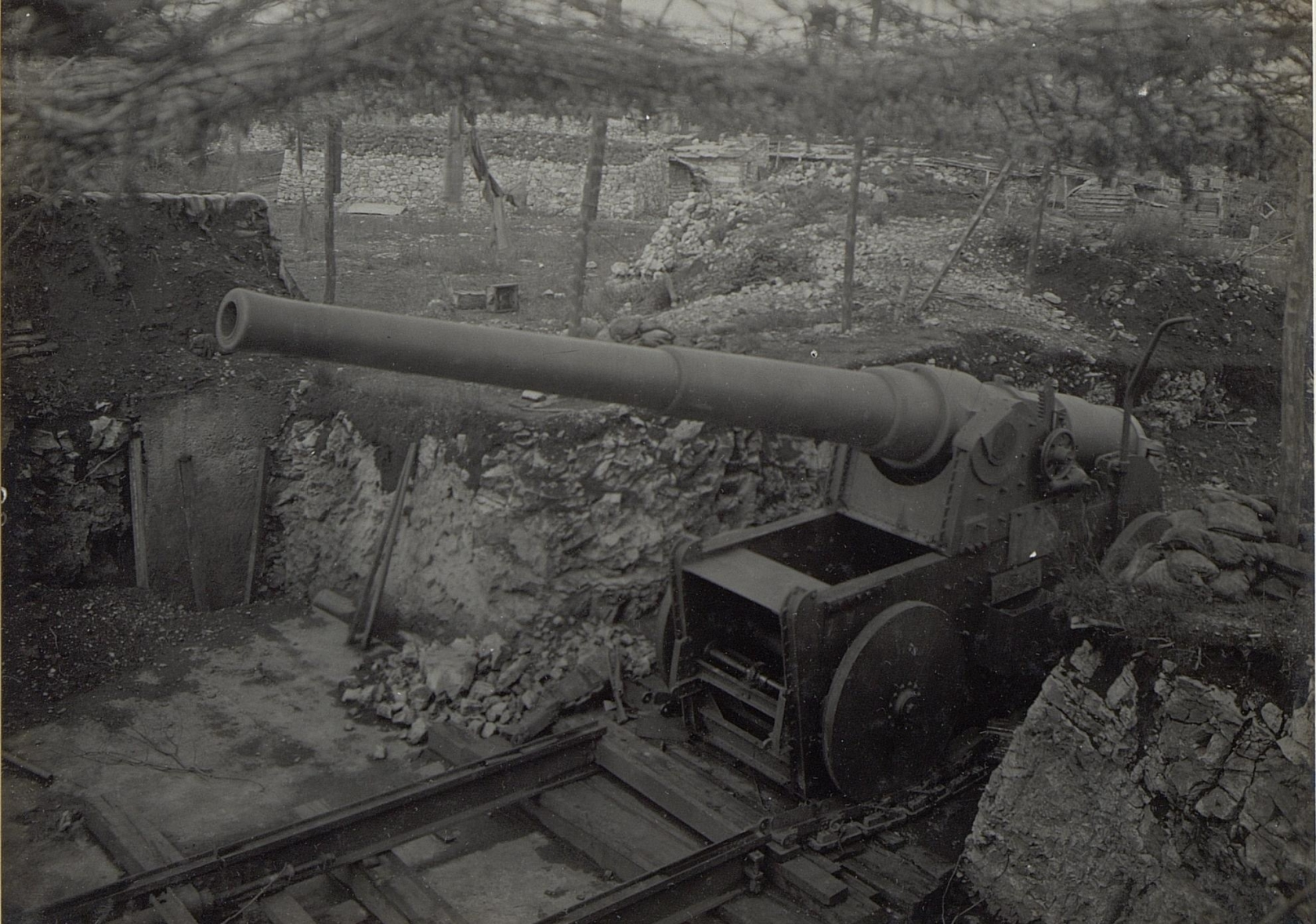

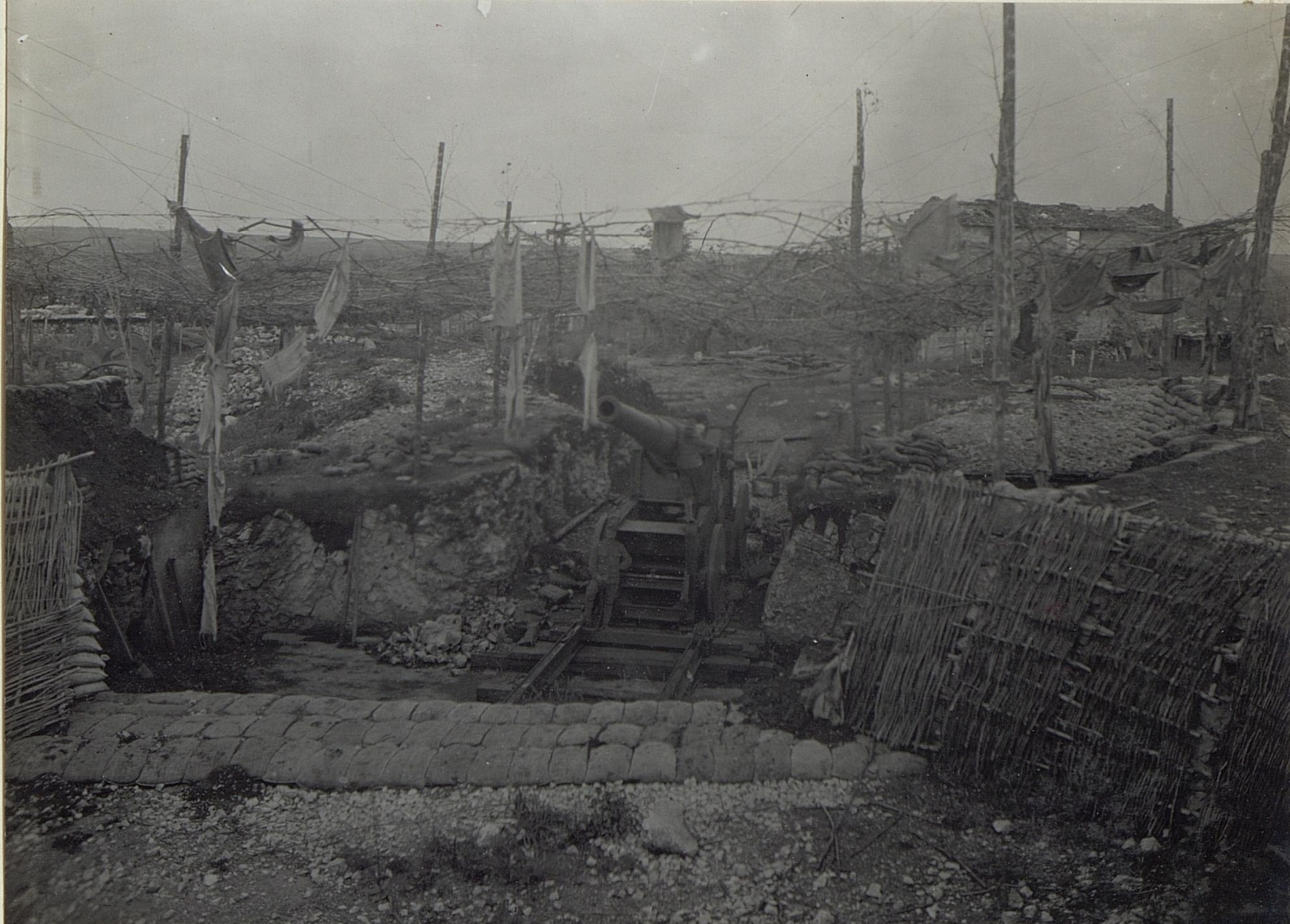
