= EOC 10 inch 40 caliber =

EOC 10 inch 40 calibre
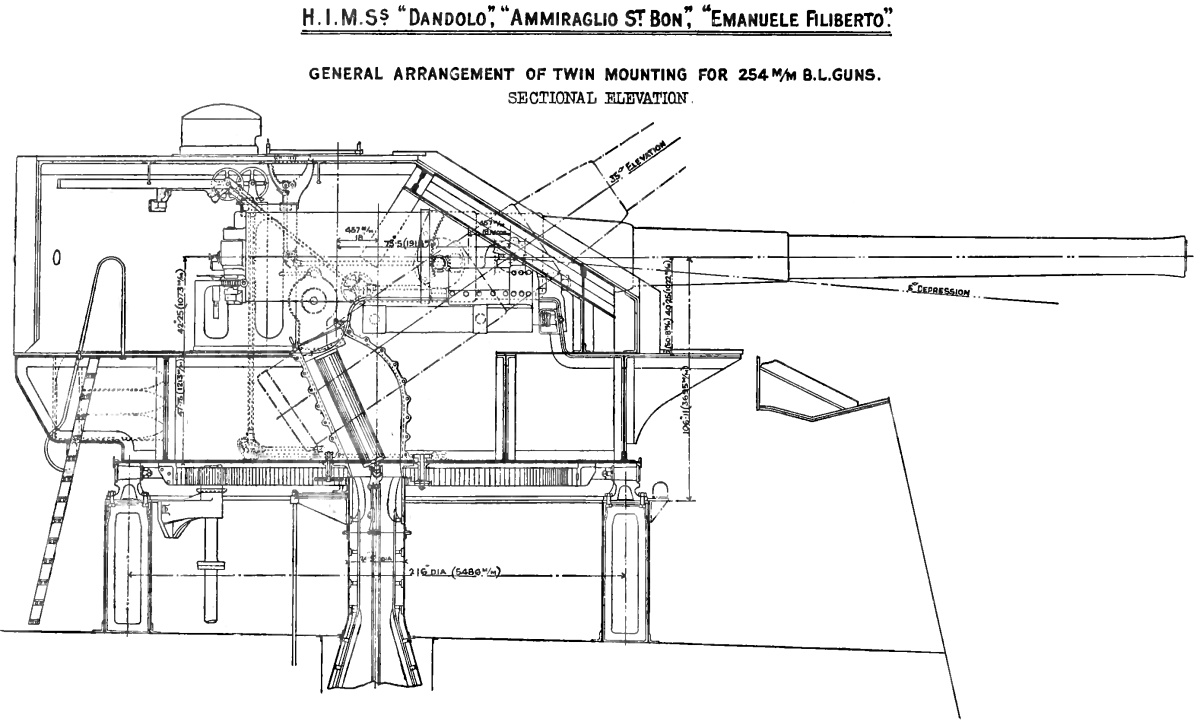
- Cross section of twin gun turret of an Ammiraglio di Saint Bon-class battleship
- Type: Naval gun
- Place of origin: United Kingdom

Service history
- In service: 1895–1945
- Used by: Argentine Navy; Imperial Japanese Navy; Regia Marina; Spanish Navy
- Wars: Russo-Japanese War; Italo-Turkish War; World War I

Production history
- Designer: Elswick Ordnance Company
- Designed: 1893
- Manufacturer: Elswick Ordnance Company; Stabilimenti meccanici di Pozzuoli; Kure Naval Arsenal
- Produced: 1893
- Variants: Pattern P Pattern P1; Pattern R Cannone da 254/40 A 1893; Cannone da 254/40 A 1899; 10 inch 40 caliber Type 41; 25 cm 40 caliber Type 41

Specifications
- Mass: 30.5 long tons (31.0 t)
- Length: 34.6 ft (10.5 m)
- Barrel length: 33 ft 7.5 in (10.249 m) 40.35 calibre
- Shell: Separate-loading 85.7 lb (38.9 kg) bagged ballistite charge
- Shell weight: 480–500 lb (220–230 kg)
- Calibre: 10.0 inches (254 mm)
- Elevation: -5° to +20°
- Traverse: -80° to +80°
- Rate of fire: About 1.5 rounds per minute
- Muzzle velocity: 2,460 ft/s (750 m/s)
- Maximum firing range: about 19,700 yd (18.0 km) with 500lb AP shell at +20°

The EOC 10 inch 40 calibre guns were a family of related guns designed by the Elswick Ordnance Company and produced by Armstrong Whitworth in the 1890s for export customers. EOC 10 inch 40 calibre guns were the primary armament of armoured cruisers, ironclads and Pre-dreadnought battleships built or refit during the 1890s. These guns and their licensed derivatives armed ships of the Argentine Navy, Imperial Japanese Navy, the Italian Regia Marina and Spanish Navy. They served in the Russo-Japanese War, Italo-Turkish War and World War I.

== History ==
Development of the 10 inch 40 calibre guns began in the early 1890s at the Elswick Ordnance Company, a subsidiary of Armstrong Whitworth, in Elswick, Newcastle upon Tyne. They were developed for export customers and had the EOC designations of Pattern P, Pattern P1 and Pattern R. They were built-up guns with an A tube and reinforced with two rows of hoops. Originally they had a semi-automatic screw breech mechanism, which opened the breech as the gun recoiled. However, this was found unsatisfactory and was replaced by a hand worked breech.

The Italian designations for the EOC 10 inch guns were Cannone da 254/40 A Modello 1893 and Cannone da 254/40 A Modello 1899. The Modello 1893 version was a trunnion-less gun, while the Modello 1899 had trunnions. Italian single gun mounts were electrically powered, while twin mounts were hydraulically powered. In addition to guns imported from the UK, licensed versions were produced by the Stabilimenti meccanici di Pozzuoli (Armstrong factory) at Pozzuoli, Italy.

In 1908 the Japanese designated EOC 10 inch guns as 10 inch 40 calibre Type 41. Later in 1917, they were re-designated in centimetres as 25 cm 40 calibre Type 41. In addition to guns imported from UK and Italy, four licensed versions were produced at the Kure Naval Arsenal beginning in 1908. The Kure guns differed from the British and Italian guns in using different rifling.

== Naval use ==
=== Argentine Navy ===
- Giuseppe Garibaldi-class cruiser - Three of the four ships of this class purchased by Argentina had a primary armament of two Pattern P guns in single gun turrets fore and aft of the superstructure.

=== Italian Navy ===
- Ammiraglio di Saint Bon-class battleship - The two ships of this class had a primary armament of four 254/40 A guns in twin turrets fore and aft of the superstructure. Both ships saw action during the Italo-Turkish War.
- Giuseppe Garibaldi-class cruisers - The three ships of this class purchased by Italy had a mixed primary armament of one 254/40 A gun in a single turret fore and two EOC 8 inch 45 calibre guns in a twin turret aft of the superstructure. All three ships saw action during the Italo-Turkish War and World War I.
- Enrico Dandolo - This ironclad ship had a primary armament of four 254/40 A guns in twin turrets en echelon amidships after an 1895-1898 refit.

=== Japanese Navy ===
- Giuseppe Garibaldi-class cruisers - One of the two ships of this class purchased by Japan the Kasuga had a mixed primary armament of one Pattern R gun in a single turret fore and two EOC 8 inch 45 calibre guns in a twin turret aft of the superstructure. The other ship the Nisshin had two EOC 8 inch 45 calibre guns in twin turrets fore and aft of the superstructure. Both ships participated in the Battle of the Yellow Sea and the Battle of Tsushima during the Russo-Japanese War.

=== Spanish Navy ===
- Giuseppe Garibaldi-class cruisers - The single ship of this class purchased by Spain, the Cristóbal Colón, was designed to carry two Pattern R guns, but the Spanish Ministry of Marine claimed they were faulty and removed them, leaving it with ten QF 6-inch guns in casemates. Cristóbal Colón was beached during the Battle of Santiago de Cuba during the Spanish–American War but sank when US Navy tried to salvage it.

== Army use ==
As the First World War settled into trench warfare on the Italian Front, the light field guns that the combatants went to war with were beginning to show their limitations when facing an enemy who was now dug into prepared Alpine positions. Indirect fire, interdiction and counter-battery fire emphasized the importance of long-range heavy artillery. In order to address the Italian Army's lack of long-range heavy artillery, surplus 254B, 254/40, 305/17, 305/40, and 305/46 naval guns were converted to land use.

These guns were mounted on the same "De Stefano" carriage for land use and the resulting guns were classified by their size in millimetres 254, their length in calibres 40 and lastly by their carriage type DS which stood for De Stefano or 254/40 DS. The De Stefano carriage was a clever, but strange looking monstrosity which looked something like a child's four-wheeled toy-horse when the gun barrel was elevated. The carriage was a large four-wheeled box-trail design with two non-steerable wheels on the front and two castering wheels at the rear. The wheels were fitted with detachable grousers designed by Major Crispino Bonagente for traction on soft ground and was towed in one piece by a Pavesi-Tolotti artillery tractor.

When not on the move the grousers were removed and the steel wheels rode on an inclined set of steel rails when in firing position. The steel rails were mounted on a firing platform made of wooden beams which allowed the gun 360° of traverse. When the gun fired recoil which was not absorbed by the recoil mechanism was transmitted to the wheels and the carriage rolled up the inclined rails and then rolled back into firing position. The box trail carriage was tall and wide enough that the breech of the gun was accessible at high angles of elevation without a pit being dug and the gun crew had a bucket and hoist for ammunition handling.

== Ammunition ==
Ammunition was of separate loading bagged charge and projectile type. The bagged ballistite charge weighed 85.7 lb (38.9 kg) and projectiles weighed between 480–500 lb (220–230 kg). The gun was able to fire: armour-piercing, armour piercing capped, and common shells.

== Gallery ==
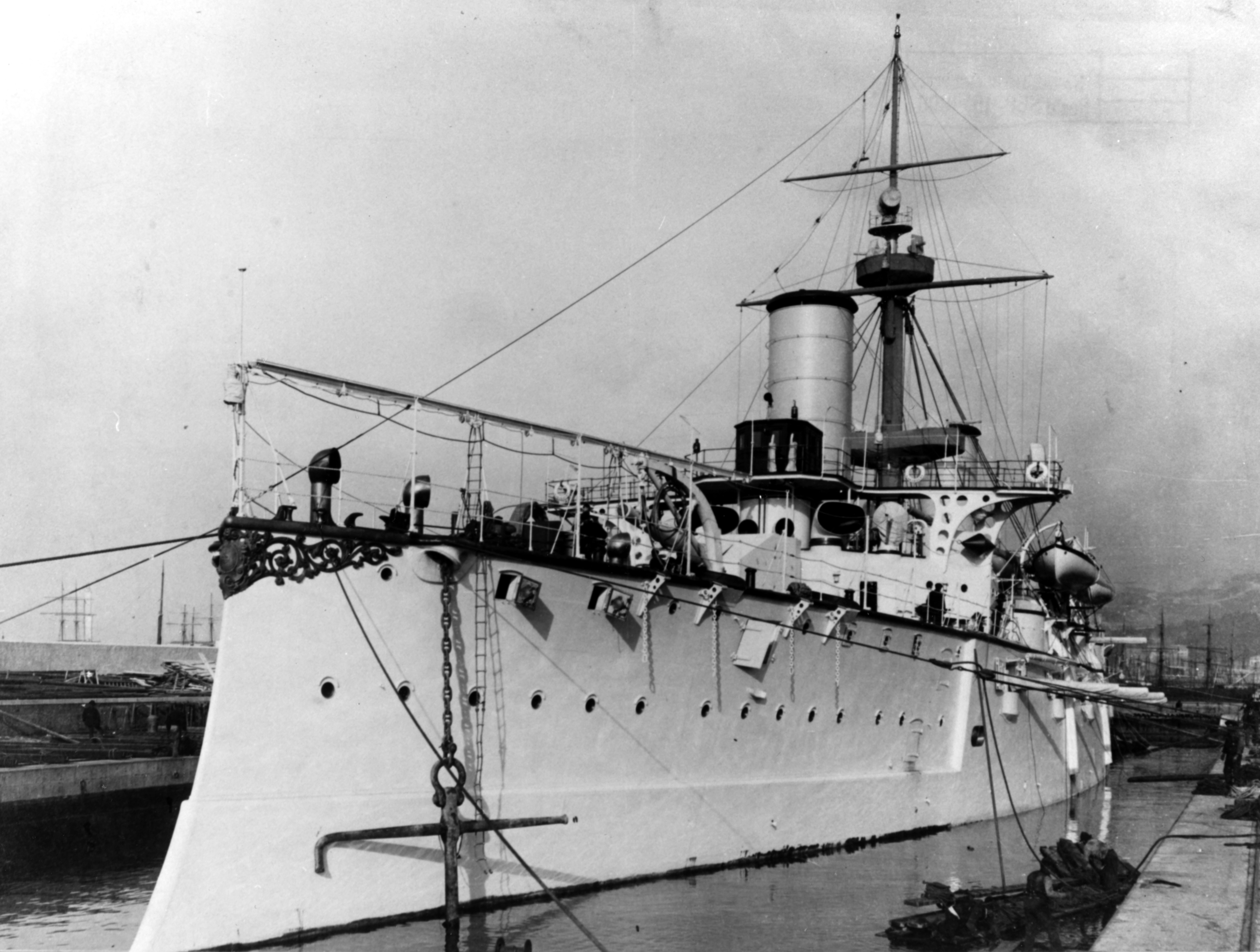
ARA Garibaldi

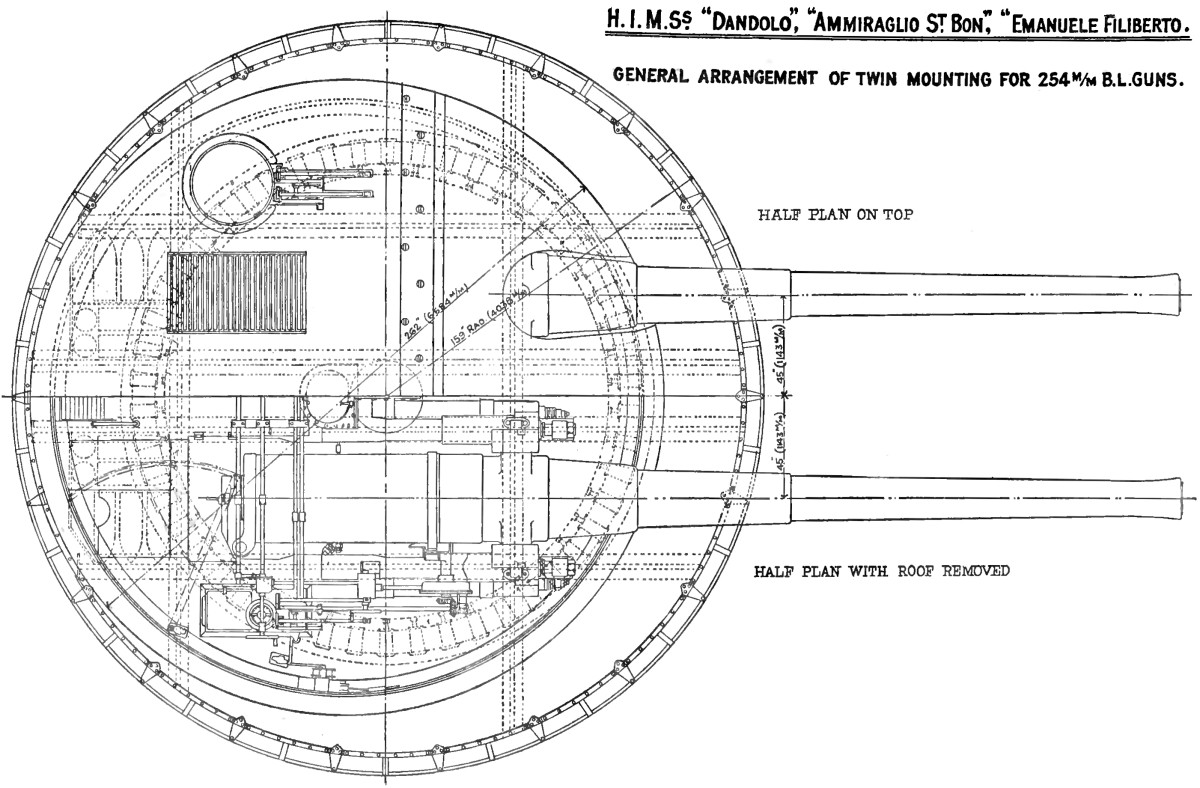
Top view of a twin 10-inch gun turret

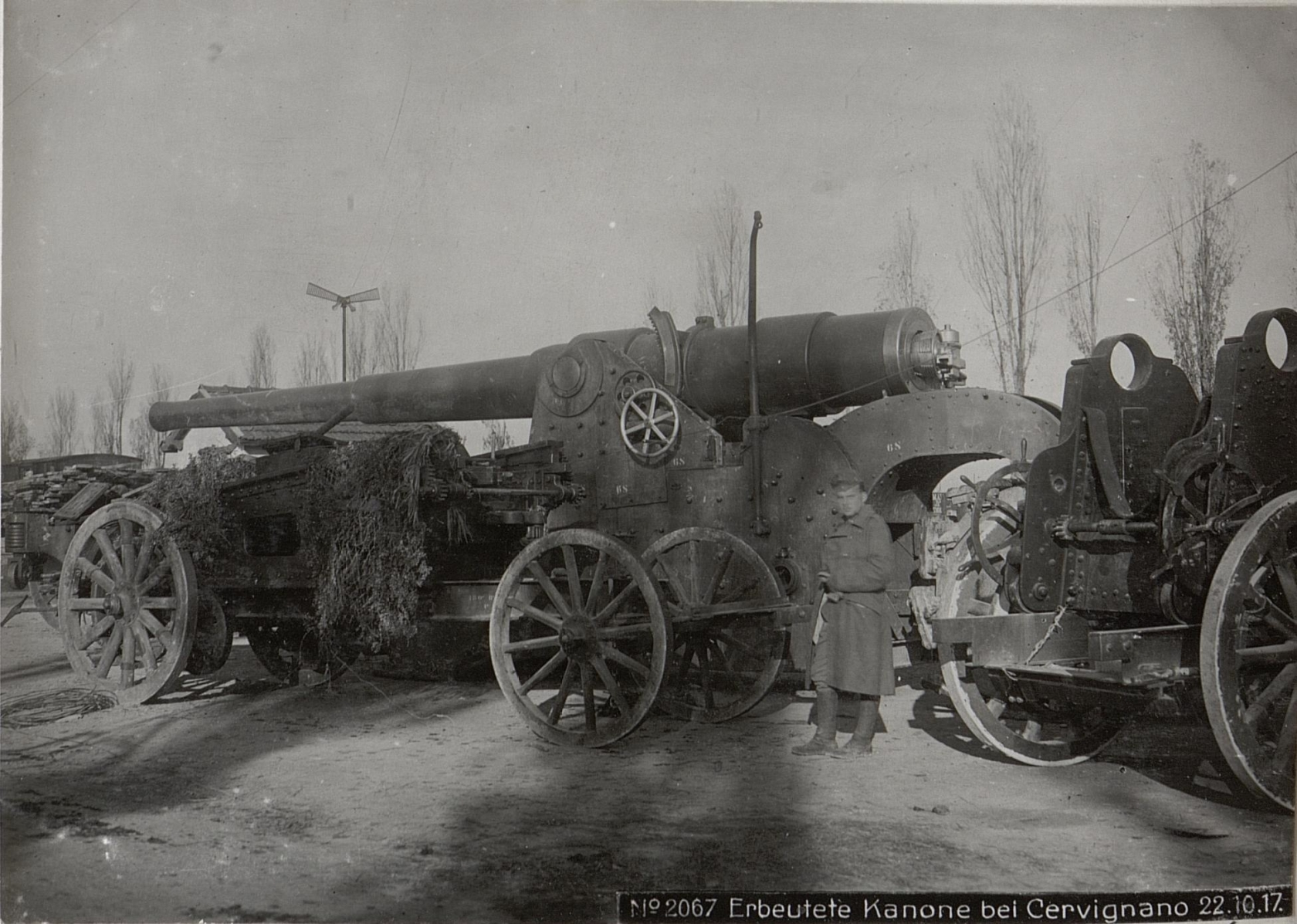
A 254/40 gun on a De Stefano carriage.

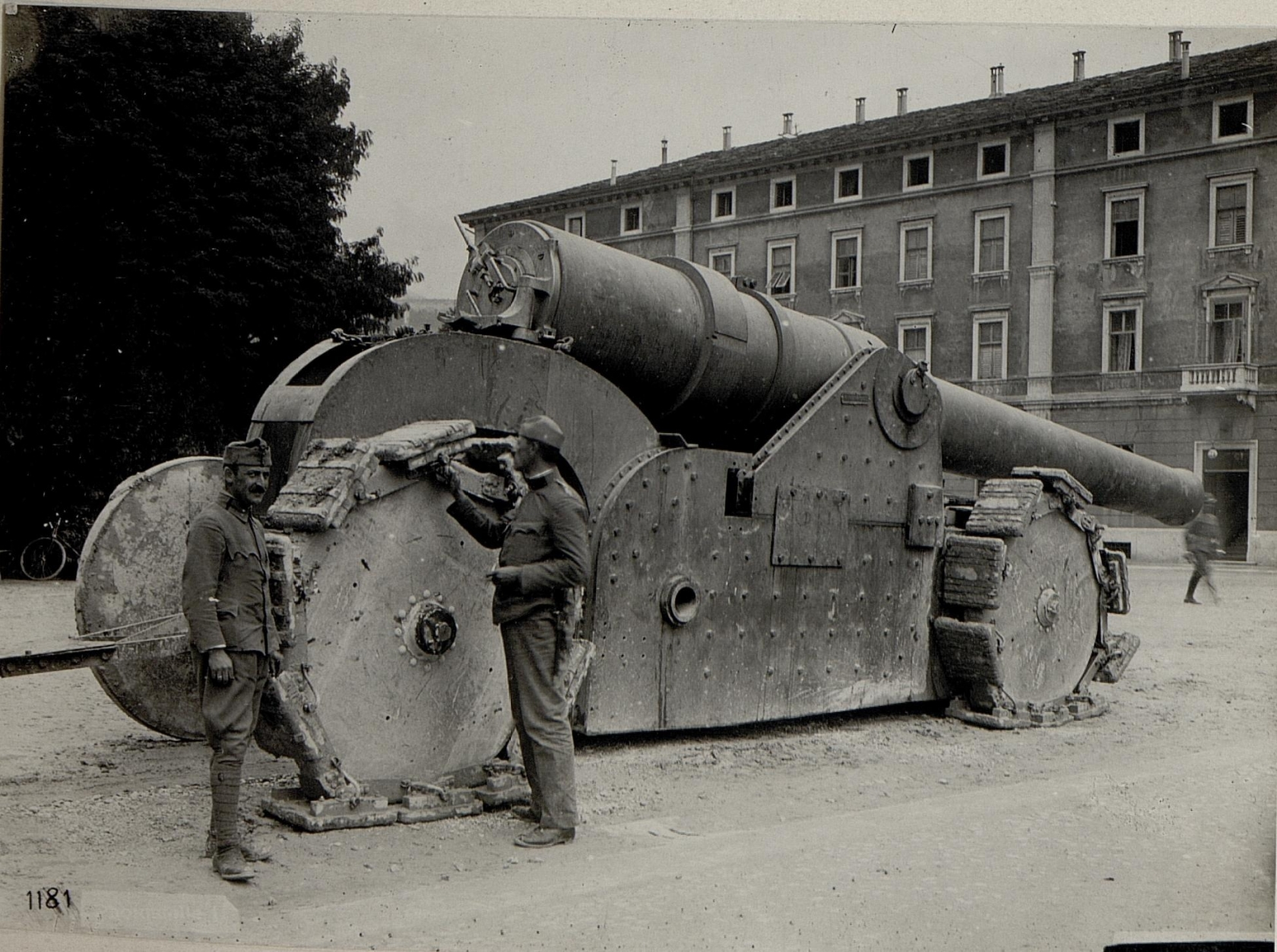
A 254/40 gun in traveling position showing its castering rear wheels and Bonagente grousers.

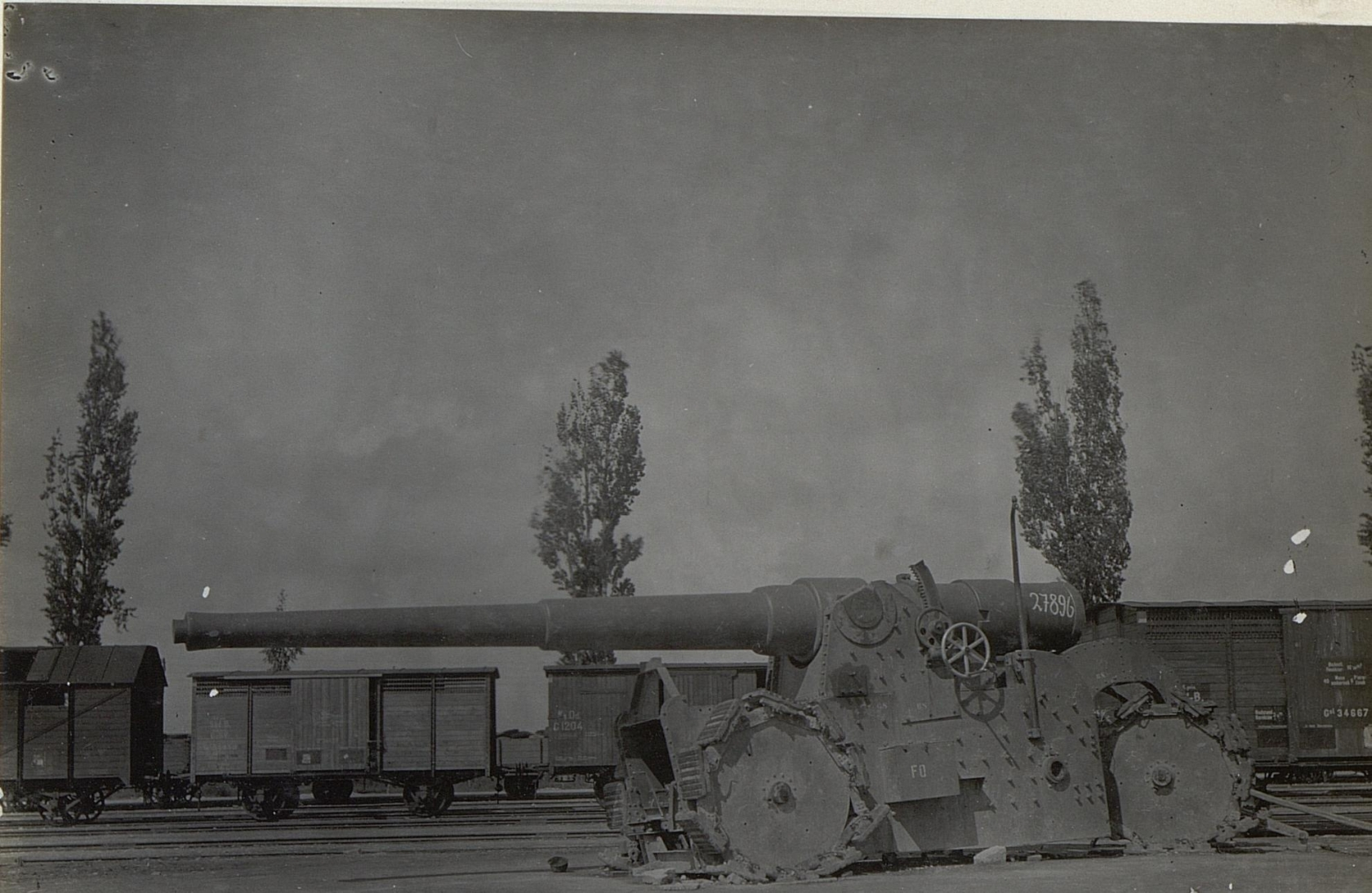
