= World War I naval arms race =

The phrase World War I naval arms race most often refers to the Anglo-German dreadnought race that is often cited as a factor in kindling the war. It can also refer to at least three other naval arms races that occurred around the same period:

- Anglo–German naval arms race
- South American dreadnought race, pre-war
- Amero–Japanese naval arms race, both before and after the war
- Greco–Ottoman dreadnought race, pre-war
