= Chilean cruiser Blanco Encalada =

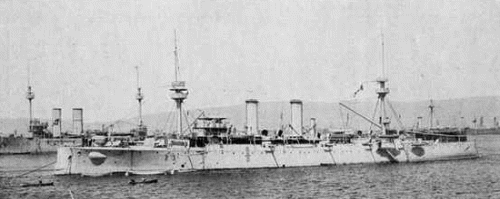
- Protected cruiser Blanco Encalada in 1918

History

Chile
- Name: Blanco Encalada
- Namesake: Manuel Blanco Encalada
- Ordered: 1892
- Builder: Armstrong Mitchell and Co. Ltd, Elswick
- Launched: 1893
- Commissioned: 1895
- Decommissioned: 1940
- Fate: Sold in 1945

General characteristics
- Class & type: Design "Yoshino" by Philip Watts (naval architect)
- Type: Protected cruiser
- Displacement: 4,420
- Length: 370 feet (110 m)
- Beam: 47 feet (14 m)
- Draft: 20.5 feet (6.2 m)
- Propulsion: 14.500 IHP
- Speed: 22.8 kn
- Complement: 427 men
- Armament: 2 × 1 - 203/40 Armstrong P; 10 × 1 - 152/40 Armstrong W; 12 × 1 - 76/40 Armstrong; 12 × 1 - 37/23 Hotchkiss, 5 - 450 TT (1 bow, 4 beam)

The protected cruiser Blanco Encalada was purchased by the Chilean Government for £333,500 during the Argentine–Chilean naval arms race. She was the second ship named Blanco Encalada. (The previous ship was the armored frigate Blanco Encalada sunk in the 1891 Chilean Civil War).

In December 1906 she was involved in the repression of the workers movement in the Saltpeter mines, railroads and harbour in Antofagasta.

On 17 December 1907 she brought troops from Arica to Iquique to repress thousands of miners from different nitrate mines in Chile's north to appeal for government intervention to improve their living and working conditions. These troops committed the Santa María School massacre.

== See also ==
- South American dreadnought race
