= South American dreadnought race =

Early 20th century arms race among Argentina, Brazil, and Chile

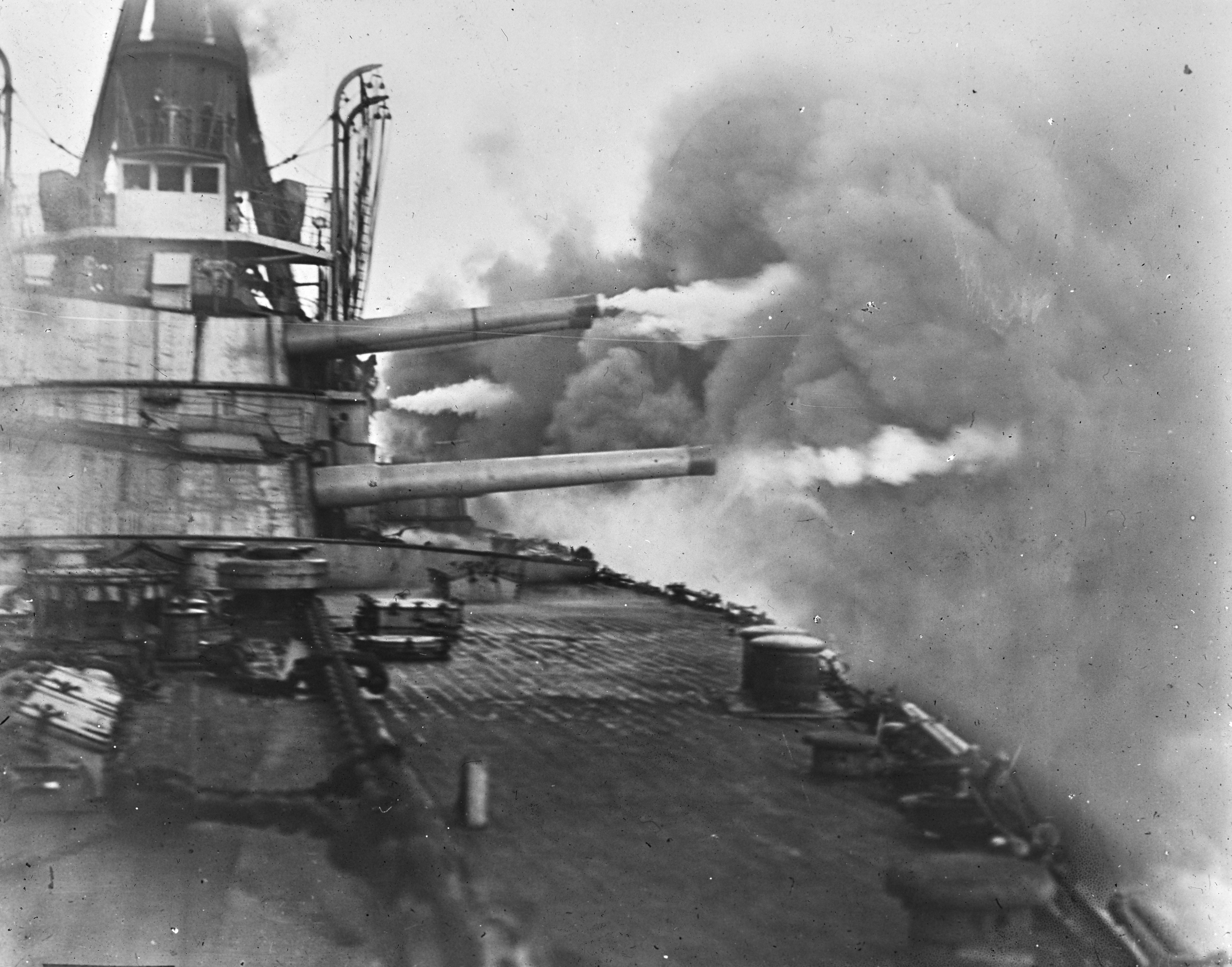
The gun trials of the Brazilian dreadnought Minas Geraes, the ship that began the dreadnought race. (Note: "Minas Geraes" was the spelling when the battleship was commissioned, but later changes to Portuguese orthography deprecated it in favor of "Minas Gerais". Primary sources use the former, having been created before the orthographical change, but there is no consensus spelling in secondary sources. This article uses "Geraes".) Here, all guns capable of training to the port side were fired, forming what was at that time the heaviest broadside ever fired off a warship.

A naval arms race between Argentina, Brazil, and Chile—the wealthiest and most powerful countries in South America—began in the early twentieth century when the Brazilian government ordered three dreadnoughts, formidable battleships whose capabilities far outstripped older vessels in the world's navies.

In 1904, the Brazilian legislature allocated substantial funds to improve the country's naval forces. Proponents of this plan believed that they needed a strong navy to become an international power and counter recent expansions of the Argentine and Chilean navies. The revolutionary design of the 1906 British warship HMS Dreadnought prompted the Brazilians to alter these plans and redirect their money into constructing three Minas Geraes-class dreadnoughts. These warships, the most powerful in the world, entered service at a time when dreadnoughts were an important factor in a nation's international prestige and therefore brought global attention to Brazil.

Although the first two dreadnoughts were completed and delivered, the third faced a different fate. Preliminarily named Rio de Janeiro, the incomplete vessel was sold to the Ottoman Empire in 1913 in the face of a slowing economy, significant political opposition after a 1910 naval revolt, and because the ship was outclassed by ever-larger super-dreadnoughts.

To counter the Brazilian acquisitions, the Argentine and Chilean governments ordered two dreadnoughts each: the Rivadavia class in 1910 and Almirante Latorre class in 1911, respectively. Each were larger and more powerful than preceding dreadnoughts ordered during the arms race. The Argentine ships were particularly controversial, facing both political opposition and shipbuilder outrage from the multi-round bidding process used to select the design of their new ships.

The First World War marked the end of the South American naval arms race, as the countries involved found themselves effectively unable to purchase additional capital ships abroad. The conflict forced the cancellation of a Brazilian super-dreadnought, Riachuelo, before construction began, while the two Chilean dreadnoughts were purchased by the British; one was re-acquired by Chile after the war. Argentina's two dreadnoughts avoided this fate by being built in the then-neutral United States, and they were commissioned in 1914 and 1915.

Although Brazil and Chile's post-war naval expansion plans called for acquiring additional dreadnought-type warships, none were ever constructed. The five dreadnoughts that made it to South American navies would be scrapped in the 1950s.

== Background ==
=== Argentine–Chilean arms race ===
Major Argentine and Chilean warship purchases and orders, 1887–1902
Year	Ships (type)	Year	Ships (type)
1887 (Chile)	Capitán Prat (BB); Presidente Errázuriz (PC); Presidente Pinto (PC)	1896 (Chile)	O'Higgins (AC)
1888 (Argentina)	Libertad (BB); Independencia (BB)	1896 (Argentina)	San Martín (AC)
1890 (Argentina)	Veinticinco de Mayo (PC)	1897 (Argentina)	Pueyrredón (AC)
1891 (Argentina)	Nueve de Julio (PC)	1898 (Argentina)	General Belgrano (AC)
1892 (Chile)	Blanco Encalada (PC)	1901 (Argentina)	Rivadavia (AC); Mariano Moreno (AC)
1894 (Argentina)	Buenos Aires (PC)	1901 (Chile)	Constitución (BB); Libertad (BB)
1895 (Chile)	Esmeralda (AC); Ministro Zenteno (PC)	1901 (Argentina)	Two battleships, possibly ordered
1895 (Argentina)	Garibaldi (AC)	1901 (Chile)	Chacabuco (PC)
Key: Chile (Argentina) Argentina BB: pre-dreadnought battleship; PC: protected cruiser; AC: armored cruiser.
The dates refer to when ships were ordered from the constructors.
Information compiled from Scheina, Naval History, 46–51, 297–99.

A dispute over conflicting Argentine and Chilean claims to Patagonia, the southernmost region in South America, began in the mid-19th century. When the two nations nearly went to war over it in the late 1870s, three major new warships were ordered by both nations: the Chileans added the world's first protected cruiser, Esmeralda, and the Argentines contracted for the central battery ironclad Almirante Brown and protected cruiser Patagonia.

A decade later, the Chilean government significantly increased their naval budget and ordered the battleship Capitán Prat, two protected cruisers, and two torpedo boats. These ships would be added to two central battery ironclads, Almirante Cochrane and Blanco Encalada (1870s), and Esmeralda.

These naval acquisitions were a major cause for concern for the Argentine government, which still had overlapping claims to Patagonia and had just watched the Chileans decisively win the War of the Pacific. Furthermore, while the country did possess more warships than the Chileans, their vessels were smaller and their crews less experienced than the battle-tested Chileans.

Facing these challenges, Argentine government quickly moved to order two battleships. This began a naval arms race between the two countries which continued through the 1890s, surviving even the expensive Chilean Civil War (1891). The two countries alternated cruiser orders over the next few years, with each order featuring an increase in capabilities; the race escalated in the middle of the decade when both countries instead began ordering powerful armored cruisers.

Tensions briefly cooled beginning in 1898 with the successful American arbitration of a boundary dispute in the northern Puna de Atacama region and the submission of the Patagonia dispute to British arbitration. However, this detente broke down just three years later when the Argentine Navy bought two armored cruisers from Italy and the Chilean Navy ordered two pre-dreadnought battleships from British shipyards. The Argentines reacted by signing letters of intent to buy two larger battleships.

The growing dispute disturbed the British government, as an armed conflict would disrupt the country's extensive commercial interests in the region. The British mediated negotiations between Argentina and Chile, and the resulting Pacts of May were signed on 28 May 1902. The third pact limited the naval armaments of both countries; both were barred from acquiring any further warships for five years without giving the other eighteen month's notice. The warships ordered in 1901 were sold: Chile's battleships became the United Kingdom's Swiftsure class, and Argentina's armored cruisers became Japan's Kasuga class; plans for Argentina's larger battleships were discarded. In addition, Capitán Prat and two Argentine armored cruisers were disarmed with the exception of their main batteries, as there was no crane in Argentina that was capable of removing the cruisers' gun turrets.

=== Brazilian decline and re-emergence ===
Major Brazilian warships, 1880–1906
Year	Ships (type)	Year	Ships (type)
1883 (Empire of Brazil)	Riachuelo (BB)	1892 (First Brazilian Republic)	Benjamin Constant (PC); República (PC)
1885 (Empire of Brazil)	Aquidabã (BB)	1896 (First Brazilian Republic)	Almirante Barroso (PC)
1890 (First Brazilian Republic)	Almirante Tamandaré (PC)	1898 (First Brazilian Republic)	Deodoro (BB); Floriano (BB)
Key: Empire of Brazil (First Brazilian Republic) First Brazilian Republic BB: Small ironclad or coast-defense ship – PC: protected cruiser
The dates refer to when they were launched, still incomplete.
Information compiled from Scheina, "Brazil", in Gardiner and Gray, Conway's 1906–21, 403–04.

In the aftermath of an 1889 army-led coup d'etat, large portions of Brazil's navy took up arms against the new government in 1891 and 1893–94. The navy's opposition cost it dearly. Despite the naval expansions in Argentina and Chile and the era's rapidly advancing naval technology, (Note: By 1906, the Brazilian Navy lagged far behind its Argentine and Chilean counterparts in both quality and total tonnage. In terms of the latter, the Chilean Navy's ships totaled 36,896 long tons (37,488 t), Argentina's 34,425 long tons (34,977 t), and Brazil's 27,661 long tons (28,105 t).) in 1896 the navy had just forty-five percent of its authorized personnel. Moreover, by the end of the century its only modern armored ships were two small coast-defense vessels. With such dilapidated defenses, José Paranhos Jr., the Baron of Rio Branco and Foreign Minister of Brazil, opined that Brazil's only remaining protection was "the moral force and old prestige still left" from Brazil's imperial era. (Note: A professional diplomat and the son of the famed Viscount of Rio Branco, the Baron of Rio Branco was named as Brazil's Foreign Minister in 1902 after a distinguished career as a diplomat, and served there until his death in 1912. In that time, he oversaw the signing of many treaties and mediated territorial disputes between Brazil and its neighbors, and became a famous name in his own right.)

As the twentieth century began, increasing global demand for coffee and rubber led to Brazil's coffee economy and rubber boom. The resulting profits gave politicians Pinheiro Machado and Rio Branco the opportunity to construct a strong navy to achieve their goal of being recognized as an international power. (Note: Seventy-five to eighty percent of the world's coffee supply was grown in Brazil, particularly in São Paulo, Minas Gerais, and Rio de Janeiro.)

The National Congress of Brazil passed a large naval acquisition program on 14 December 1904, but the navy divided itself into two factions over what ships should be purchased. One, supported by the British armament company Armstrong Whitworth (which eventually received the order), favored a fleet centered around a small number of large warships. The other, supported by Rio Branco, preferred a larger navy composed of smaller warships.

At first, the smaller warships faction prevailed. After Law no. 1452 was passed on 30 December 1905, which authorized £4,214,550 for new warship construction (£1,685,820 in 1906), three small battleships, three armored cruisers, six destroyers, twelve torpedo boats, three submarines, a collier, and a training ship were ordered. Though the Brazilian government later eliminated the armored cruisers for monetary reasons, the Minister of the Navy, Admiral Júlio César de Noronha, signed a contract with Armstrong Whitworth for the planned battleships on 23 July 1906. The acquisition was supported by the incoming Brazilian president Afonso Pena, who told the National Congress of Brazil in November 1906 that the ships were necessary to replace the antiquated vessels composing the current navy and the battleship Aquidabã, which had unexpectedly blown up earlier that year.

British industrial interests welcomed the lucrative contracts. Much of the British Admiralty and establishment argued in favour of exports, especially to nations unlikely to become hostile to the U.K., since they would allow Great Britain to expand her own shipbuilding capacity at essentially no cost to the British government. However, the British ambassador to Brazil was opposed to the planned naval expansion due to its large cost and negative impact on relations between Brazil and Argentina. He saw it as "an embodiment of national vanity, combined with personal motives of a pecuniary character." The US ambassador to Brazil also spoke out against the purchase and warned his Department of State of the regional destabilization that could occur if the situation devolved into a full naval arms race. The US government attempted to diplomatically coerce the Brazilians into canceling their ships, but these attempts were dismissed; the Baron of Rio Branco remarked that caving to the American demands would render Brazil as powerless as Cuba, whose new constitution allowed the American government to intervene in Cuban affairs.

== First Brazilian battleships ==
After construction began on Brazil's three new small battleships, the Brazilian government proceeded to reconsider their order and chosen battleship design (something that would happen several more times during the construction of Rio de Janeiro in 1913). This was wrought by the debut of the United Kingdom's new dreadnought concept, which was represented by the surprisingly fast construction and commissioning of the eponymous ship in 1906. The hallmark of this new warship type was its "all-big-gun" armament, which utilized many more heavy-caliber weapons than previous battleships, and it rendered the Brazilian ships obsolete before they were completed.

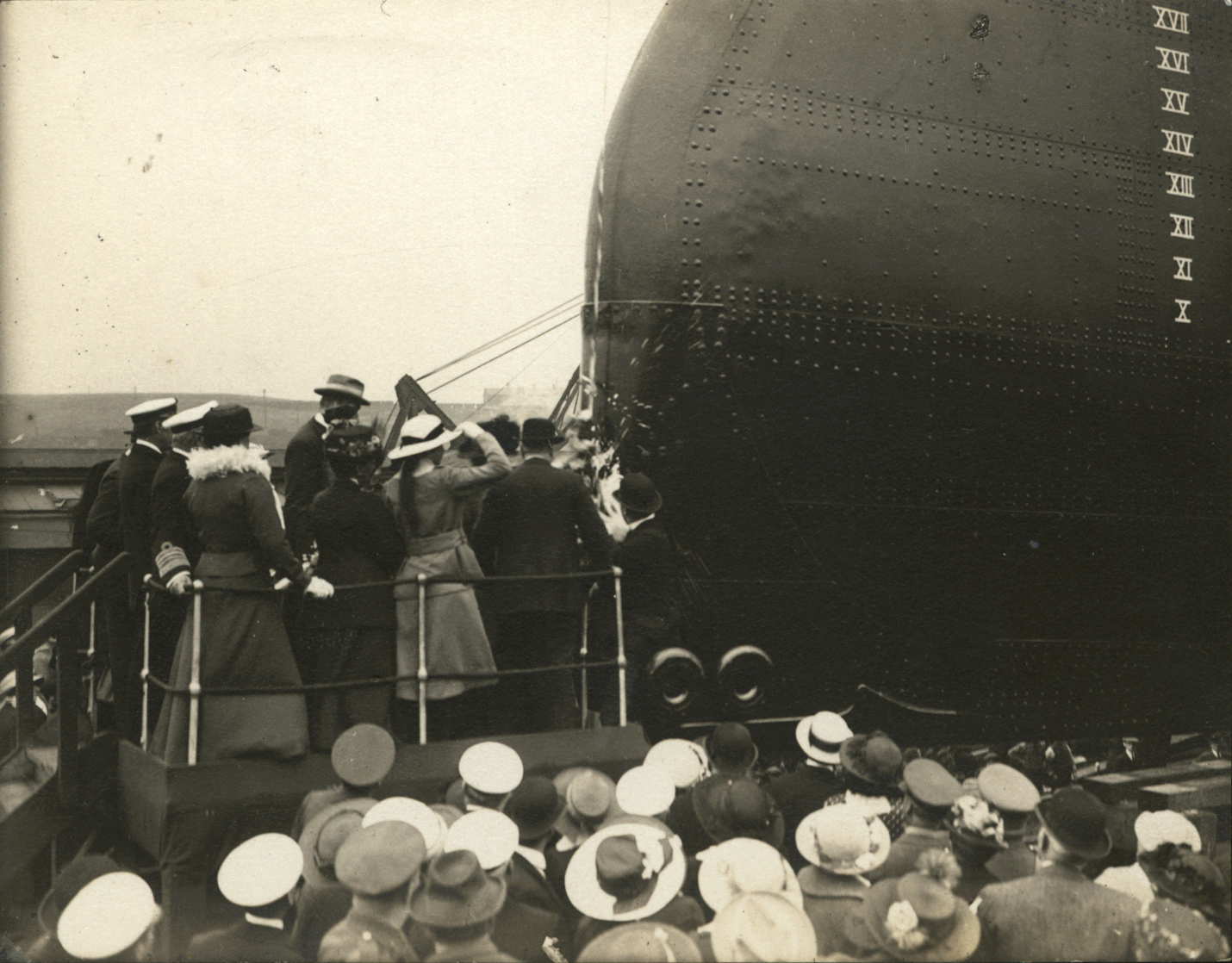
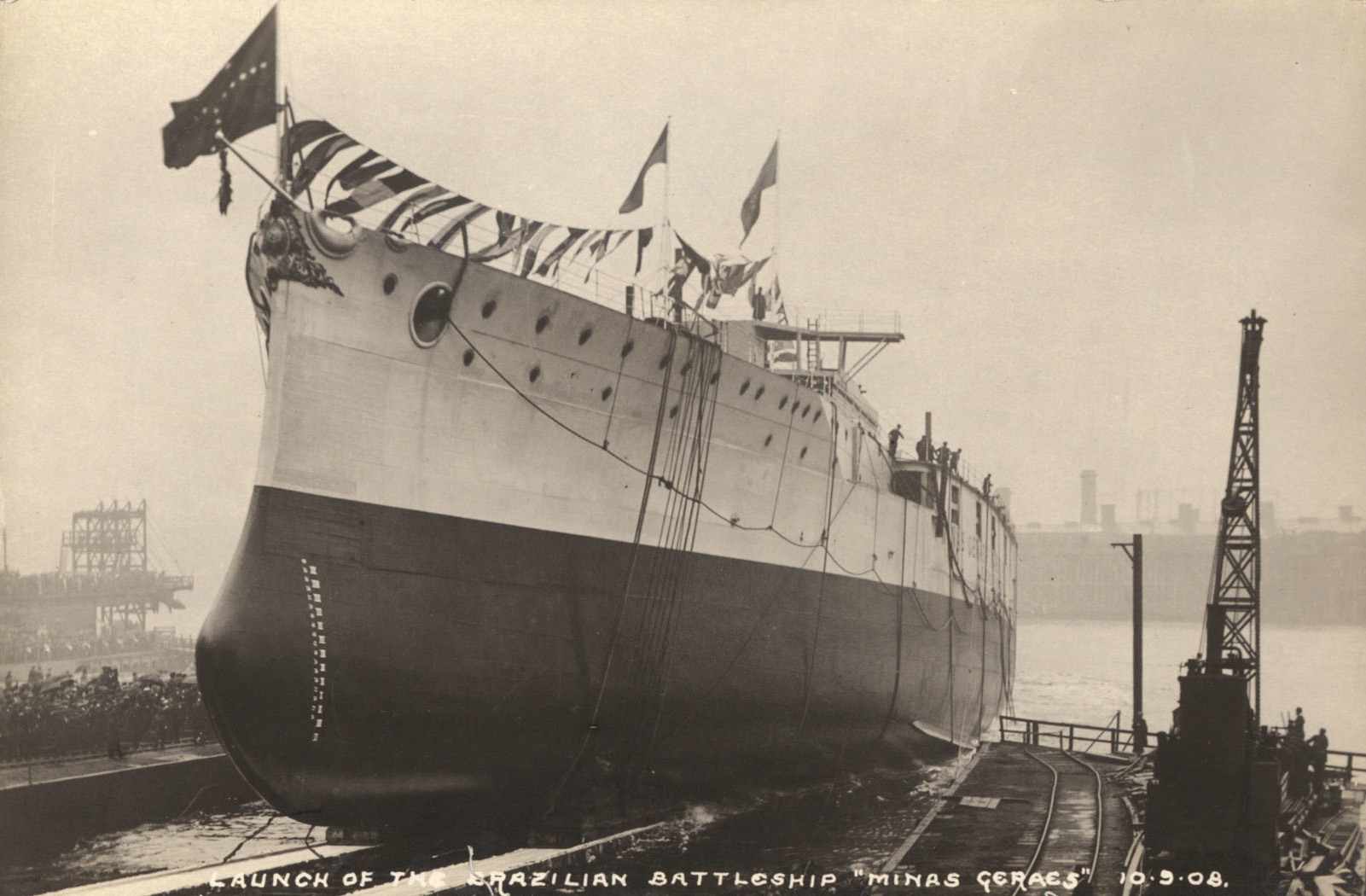
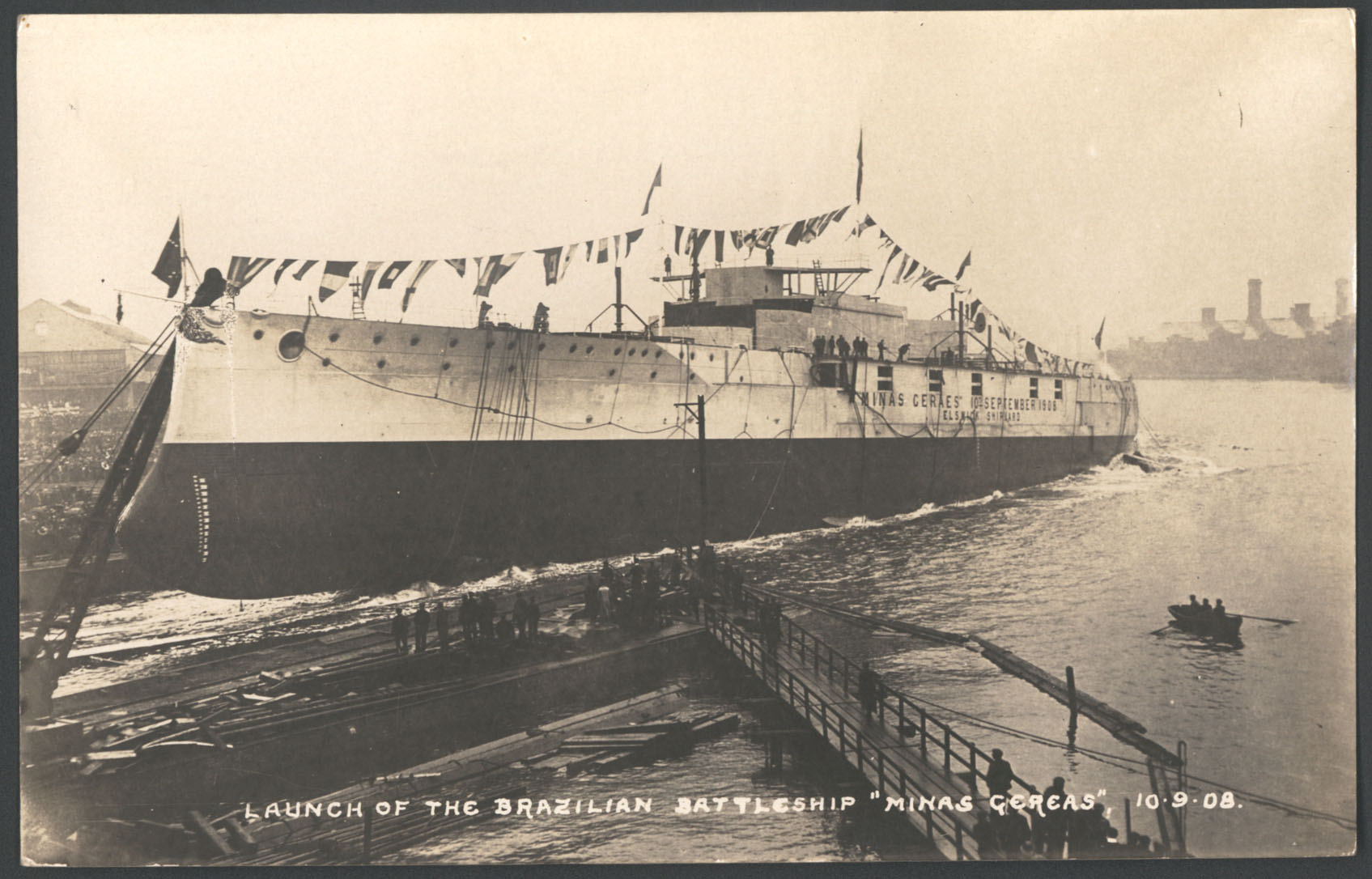
The christening and launch, respectively, of Minas Geraes on 10 September 1908. As the ship has not been completed (or in naval terms, fitting-out), it weighed only around 9,000 long tons at this time.

The money authorized for naval expansion in 1905 was redirected to constructing:

- three dreadnoughts (with the third to be laid down after the first was launched)
- three scout cruisers (later reduced to two, which became the Bahia class)
- fifteen destroyers (later reduced to ten, the Pará class)
- three submarines (the Foca class)
- two submarine tenders (later reduced to one, Ceará)

This move was made with the large-scale support of Brazilian politicians, including Pinheiro Machado and a nearly unanimous vote in the Senate; the navy, now with a large-ship advocate, Rear Admiral Alexandrino Faria de Alencar, in the influential post of minister of the navy; and the Brazilian press. Still, these changes were made with the stipulation that the total price of the new naval program not exceed the original limit, so the increase in battleship tonnage was bought with the previous elimination of armored cruisers and decreasing the number of destroyer-type warships. The three battleships on which construction had begun were scrapped beginning on 7 January 1907, and the design for the new dreadnoughts was approved on 20 February. Newspapers began covering the Brazilian warship order in March, and Armstrong laid down the first dreadnought on 17 April. The full order—including all three dreadnoughts and the two cruisers—was reported by the New York Herald, Daily Chronicle, and the Times later that year.

The Brazilian order for what contemporary commentators called "the most powerful battleship[s] in the world" came at a time when few countries in the world had contracted for such armament. Brazil was the third country to have a dreadnought under construction, behind the United Kingdom, with Dreadnought and the Bellerophon class, and the United States, with the South Carolina class. This meant that Brazil was in line to have a dreadnought before many of the world's perceived powers, like France, the German Empire, the Russian Empire, and the Empire of Japan. (Note: In reality, the first German dreadnought was commissioned on 1 October 1909, about three months before Brazil's Minas Geraes was completed, despite being laid down two months after the Brazilian ship.) As dreadnoughts were quickly equated with international status, somewhat similar to nuclear weapons today—that is, regardless of a state's need for such equipment, simply ordering and possessing a dreadnought increased the owner's prestige—the order caused a stir in international relations.

Some newspapers and journals located around the world speculated that Brazil was acting as a proxy for a stronger country which would take possession of the two dreadnoughts soon after completion, as they did not believe that a previously insignificant geopolitical power would contract for such armament. Many American, British, and German sources variously accused the Americans, British, German, or Japanese governments of secretly plotting to purchase the vessels. (Note: Many contemporary sources reported the varying versions, including: "British-Brazilian Warships", Navy, 11–12; "The Brazilian 'Dreadnoughts'", Navy, 13–14; "Mystery of the Brazilian 'Dreadnoughts'", Literary Digest, 102–03; "The Mystery of the Great Brazilian Dreadnoughts", World's Work, 10867–68; "Left Behind in Rio", Boston Evening Transcript, 25 January 1908, 2; "Giant Ships for England or Japan", New York Herald, 1 July 1908, 9; "Brazil, Japan, and Great Britain", Sun (New York), 1 July 1908, 6; "Mysterious Battleships", Evening Telegraph (Angus, Scotland), 17 July 1908, 3; "The Brazilian Battleships", Japan Weekly Mail, 5 September 1908, 288; "Germany May Buy English Warships", New York Times, 9 August 1908, C8; "May Take Brazil's Ships, Day (New London), 19 March 1909, 7; "The Race for Naval Supremacy", Nelson Evening Mail, 6 April 1909, 2; However, on the eve of the First World War, the Russian government—a country rarely mentioned in these news articles—actually did make offers to the Brazilian and Argentine governments for their dreadnoughts, possibly to preempt the Ottomans. Both refused.) The World's Work remarked:

The question that is puzzling diplomats the world over is why Brazil should want ferocious leviathans of such size and armament and speed as to place them ten to fifteen years in advance of any other nation besides Great Britain. [...] Although Brazil has denied that these are meant for England or Japan, naval men of all nations suspect that they are meant for some government other than Brazil's. (Note: A series of rumors supporting the Japanese theory, where Brazil was alleged to have placed large armament orders in the United Kingdom on behalf of Japan for use against the United States, was strongly denied by the Brazilian government. Rio Branco, through a telegram sent to the Brazilian ambassador to the United States Joaquim Nabuco, based his counter-argument in the close relationship between Brazilian and American governments, saying "The old and cordial friendship between our countries is known, as well as the excellent relations existing between their governments. [...] Every sensible person will understand that an honest and respectable government would not lend itself to play the part attributed to Brazil by the inventor of the news.") In the event of war, the government which would first be able to secure these vessels… would immediately place the odds of naval supremacy in its favor. England, no matter how many Dreadnoughts she has, would be compelled to buy them to keep them from some lesser power. They bring a new question into international politics. They may be leaders of a great fleet which minor government are said to be preparing to build; or, to put it more accurately, to stand sponsors for. Some Machiavellian hand may be at work in this new game of international politics and the British Admiralty is suspected. But every statesmen and naval student may make his own guess.

On the other side of the Atlantic, in the midst of the Anglo–German naval arms race, members of the British House of Commons fretted over the battleships' possible destinations, though the Admiralty consistently stated that they did not believe any sale would occur. In mid-July and September 1908, the Commons discussed purchasing the ships to bolster the Royal Navy and ensure they would not be sold to a foreign rival, which would disrupt the British naval plan set in place by the "two-power standard," though in March and late July 1908, the Brazilian government officially denied any sale was planned. In March 1909, the British press and House of Commons began pushing for more dreadnoughts after the First Lord of the Admiralty, Reginald McKenna, asserted that Germany had stepped up its building schedule and would complete thirteen dreadnoughts in 1911—four more than previously estimated. Naturally, the subject of purchasing the Brazilian dreadnoughts already being built was brought up, and McKenna had to officially deny that the government was planning to tender an offer for the warships. He also stated that a sale to a foreign nation would be inconsequential, as "our present superiority in strength in 1909–10 is so great that no alarm would be created in the mind of the Board of Admiralty."

Despite the plethora of rumors, the Brazilian government was not planning to sell their ships. Dreadnoughts formed an important role in Rio Branco's goal of raising Brazil's international status, according to the New York Mail:

Brazil begins to feel the importance of her great position, the part she may play in the world, and is taking measures in a beginner's degree commensurate with that realization. Her battle-ship-building is one with her attitude at The Hague, and these together are but part and parcel, not of a vainglorious striving after position, but of a just conception of her future. Dr. Ruy Barboza [sic] did not oppose the details of representation on the international arbitral tribunal out of antipathy to the United States, but because he believed that the sovereignty of Brazil was at least equal to that of any other sovereign nation, and because he was convinced that unequal representation on that tribunal would result in the establishment of 'categories of sovereignty'—a thing utterly opposed to the philosophy of equal sovereign rights. And as in international law ... so in her navy, Brazil seeks to demonstrate its sovereign rank. (Note: cf. Hague Conventions of 1899 and 1907 § Hague Convention of 1907)

== Argentine and Chilean response ==
=== Argentina ===
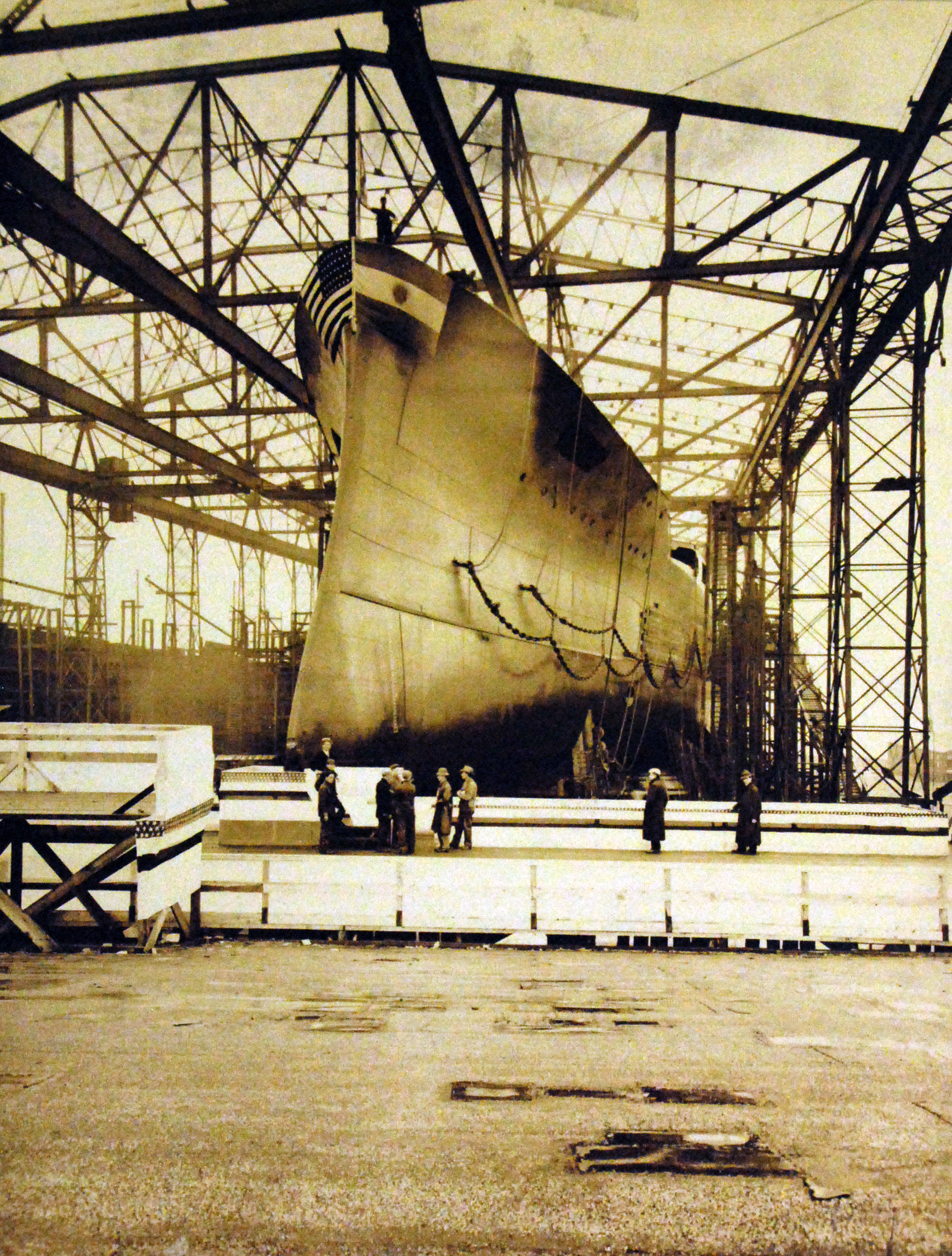
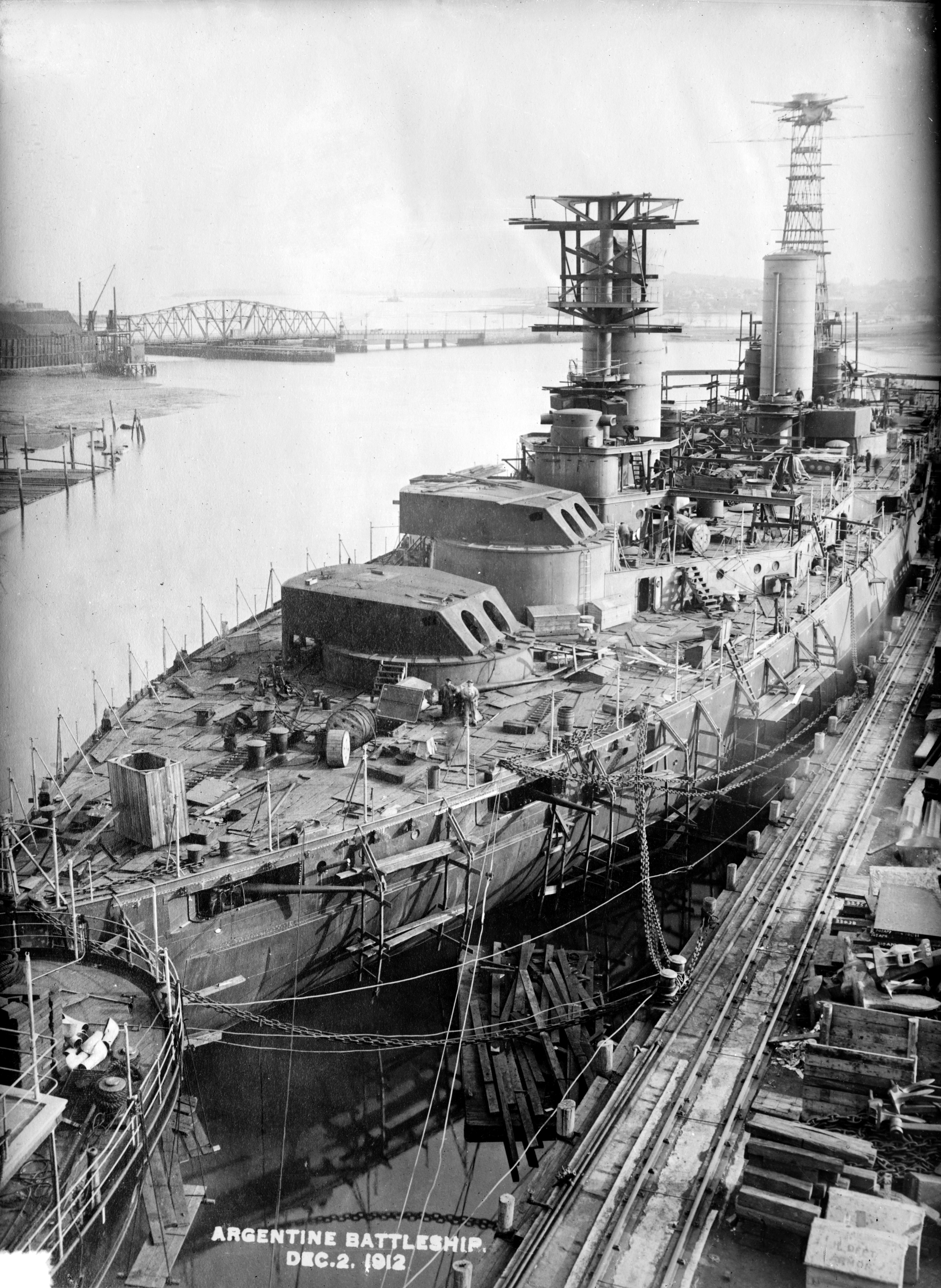
The Argentine Rivadavia (pictured) and Moreno were constructed in the United States, and were the only American dreadnoughts built for a foreign country.

Argentina was highly alarmed by the Brazilian move, and they quickly moved to nullify the remaining months of the naval-limiting restrictions in the 1902 pact with Chile. In November 1906, Argentina's Minister of Foreign Affairs, Manuel Augusto Montes de Oca, remarked that any one of the new Brazilian vessels could destroy the entire Argentine and Chilean fleets. Despite the seeming hyperbole, his statement—made before the Brazilian government reordered the ships as dreadnoughts—ended up being close to the truth: in 1910, at least, the new Brazilian warships were seemingly stronger than any other vessel in the world, let alone any one ship in the Argentine or Chilean fleets. With this in mind, the Journal of the American Society of Naval Engineers opined that maintaining the older Libertad class or Capitán Prat (respectively) was now a waste of money.

The Argentine government's alarm continued under de Oca's successor, Estanislao Zeballos. In June 1908, Zeballos presented a plan to the Argentine Congress where they would offer the Brazilian government a chance to give one of their two unfinished dreadnoughts to Argentina. This would allow the two countries a chance to enjoy relative naval parity. Should the Brazilians refuse, Zeballos planned to issue an ultimatum: if they did not comply in eight days, the mobilized Argentine Army would invade what the army and navy ministers claimed was a defenseless Rio de Janeiro. Unfortunately for Zeballos, his plan was leaked to the media, and the resulting public outcry—Argentine citizens happened to not be in favor of their government borrowing large sums of money to mobilize the army and go to war—ensured his resignation. (Note: The end of Zeballos' tenure as Foreign Minister was extremely contentious, as another controversy closely linked to him began shortly after his resignation. The Argentine government, fearing a Brazilian–Chilean alliance, paid particular attention to the two countries' communications, leading to the now-famous Telegram no. 9. This communication, sent from the Brazilian government to their representatives in Chile, was intercepted by the Argentine government and supposedly decoded in Zeballos' last days as minister. It was read in a congressional session one day after Zeballos' departure, and the new Minister of Foreign Affairs claimed it was proof of intended Brazilian aggression against Argentina. The full but fraudulent contents of the telegram were released by Zeballos to the press, which kindled international disenchantment with Brazil. However, in a public relations coup, Rio Branco released the cipher and actual full contents of the telegram, which proved it contained no reference to belligerent Brazilian intents on Argentina. The actual telegram was then printed in several prominent Argentine newspapers. Zeballos was later accused of deliberately distorting or forging the telegram, though there was no definitive proof; it may have been his secretary. Whatever Zeballos' culpability, his actions in that June may have been motivated by a personal vendetta against Rio Branco, who had bested Zeballos on several occasions since 1875, most notably during a border dispute arbitrated by American President Grover Cleveland (the Palmas Issue, or Questão de Palmas).)

The Argentine government was also deeply concerned with the possible effect on the country's large export trade, as a Brazilian blockade of the entrance to the River Plate would cripple the Argentine economy. The acquisition of dreadnoughts to maintain an equal footing with Brazil would, in the words of the Argentine admiral overseeing his countries' dreadnoughts while they were being constructed, avoid a "preponderance of power on the other side, where a sudden gust of popular feeling or injured pride might make [a blockade] a dangerous weapon against us."

Both countries faced difficulty in financing their own dreadnoughts. Although in Argentina the ruling National Autonomist Party supported the purchases, they initially faced public resistance for such expensive acquisitions. An influx of inflammatory newspaper editorials supporting new dreadnoughts, especially from La Prensa, and renewed border disputes, particularly Brazilian assertions that the Argentines were attempting to restore the Viceroyalty of the Río de la Plata, swayed the public to support the purchases. The Argentine President, José Figueroa Alcorta, attempted to ease the tensions with a message warning the Brazilians of a naval arms race should they continue on their present course. The Brazilian government replied with reasoning similar to Pena's speech in 1906, in that they believed the ships were necessary to replace the antiquated equipment left by the long-term neglect of the Brazilian Navy, and they repeatedly insisted that the ships were not meant for use against Argentina.

In August, a bill authorizing the Argentine Navy to acquire three dreadnoughts was passed by the Chamber of Deputies seventy-two to thirteen. Three months later, it was defeated in the Senate after they approved an arbitration treaty and the government made a last-ditch offer to purchase one of the two Brazilian dreadnoughts currently being constructed. The Brazilian government declined, so the bill was reintroduced and passed by the Senate on 17 December 1908 with forty-nine in support to thirteen opposed, over socialist objections that the country needed to be populated and the large sum of money (£14,000,000) could be better spent in other areas of the government.

After the Argentine government sent a naval delegation to Europe to solicit and evaluate armament companies' offers, they received tenders from fifteen shipyards in five countries (the United States, Great Britain, Germany, France, and Italy), and conducted a drawn-out bidding process. The Argentine delegation rejected all of the bids twice, each time recycling the best technical aspects of the tendered designs when crafting new bidding requirements. The reason given for the first rejection was the appearance of the first super-dreadnought, HMS Orion. Still, the shipbuilders were furious, as the process of designing a major warship took large amounts of time and money, and they believed the Argentine tactic revealed their individual trade secrets. A British naval architect published a scathing condemnation of the Argentine tactics, albeit only after the contracts were not awarded to a British company:

We may assume that the British battleships embody good ideas and good practice—in all probability the very best. These cannot fail, in a greater or less degree, to become part of the design which the British shipbuilder first submits to the Argentine Government. In the second inquiry it may be presumed that everything that was good in the first proposals had been seized upon by the Argentine authorities and asked for in the new design. This second request went not only to British builders but to all the builders of the world, and in this way it is exceedingly probable that a serious leakage of ideas and practice of our ships was disseminated through the world by the Argentine government. ... The third inquiry that was issued showed to all the builders of the world what has been eliminated or modified in the second inquiry; and so the process of leakage went merrily on, and with it that of the education of foreign builders and the Argentine government.

The United States' Fore River Ship and Engine Company tendered the lowest bid—in part owing to the availability of cheap steel, though they were accused of quoting an unprofitable price so the ships could act as loss leaders—and was awarded the contract. This aroused further suspicion in the European bidders, who had previously believed that the United States was a non-contender, though Argentina did order twelve destroyers from British, French, and German shipyards to soften the blow. (Note: Four were ordered from each country, but only the German-built destroyers of the Catamarca and La Plata classes would go on to serve in the Argentine Navy. Of the other eight, the British-built destroyers were purchased by Greece shortly before the First Balkan War (the Aetos (Wild Beast) class), and the French-built ships were taken over by that country at the outbreak of the First World War (the Aventurier class).) These bidders, along with newspapers like the Times (London), turned their anger on the American government under President William Howard Taft, whose so-called "Dollar Diplomacy" policy had led his State Department to go to great lengths to obtain the contracts. (Note: The United States offered Argentina certain economic and military concessions: the removal of import tariffs on hides from Argentina, an offer to release the Americans' most technologically advanced fire-control system and torpedo tubes for use on the Argentine ships, and promises for additional concessions if American shipbuilders were selected. American bankers were also persuaded to offer a US$10 million loan to the Argentine government. Furthermore, the United States' Delaware was sent on ten-week South American voyage in 1911 to support these efforts. The efforts to win the Argentine and Chilean battleship orders came as part of a widespread and mostly unsuccessful effort to obtain naval contracts from countries from China to Europe to Latin America.) Their reactions may have been justified: Taft boasted in the high-profile 1910 State of the Union address that the Argentine dreadnought order was awarded to American manufacturers "largely through the good offices of the Department of State."

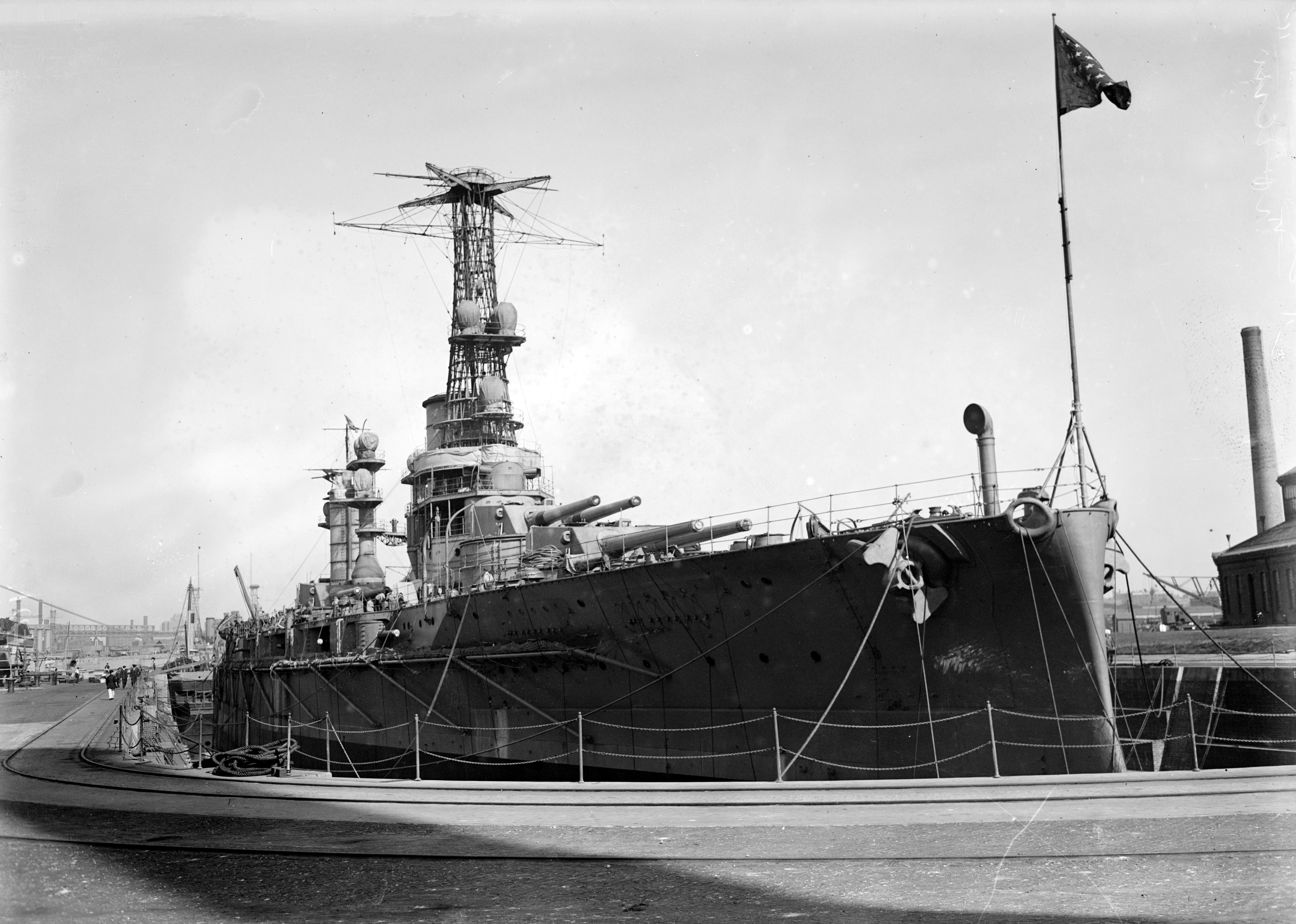
Moreno being painted in dry dock at the Brooklyn Navy Yard, October 1914

The Argentine contract included an option for a third dreadnought in case the Brazilian government adhered to its contractual obligations to order a third dreadnought. Two newspapers, La Prensa and La Argentina, heavily advocated for a third ship; the latter even started a petition to raise money for a new battleship. The American minister to Argentina, Charles H. Sherrill, cabled back to the United States that "this newspaper rivalry promises the early conclusion of a movement which means a third battleship whether by public subscription or by Government funds." On 31 December 1910, the Argentine government decided against constructing the ship, after Roque Sáenz Peña, who had been making entreaties to Brazil to end the expensive naval race, was elected to the Presidency. In addition, the intended target of the third Argentine dreadnought, the third Brazilian dreadnought, had already been canceled multiple times. (Note: The third dreadnought, which was provided for in the original contract and would have been named Rio de Janeiro, was laid down on 16 March 1910. As the ship had already been eclipsed by new naval technology (chiefly the advent of super-dreadnoughts, beginning with the British Orion), the Brazilian government canceled it on 7 May and asked Armstrong to prepare a new design. The new contract was signed in October, but by November a new naval minister was appointed who had a different design in mind. cf. South American dreadnought race § Reciprocation: Brazil orders again.)

=== Chile ===
The Chilean government delayed their naval plans after a financial depression brought on by the 1906 Valparaíso earthquake and a drastic fall in the nitrate market in 1907, but these economic problems were not enough to stop them from countering the dreadnoughts purchased by their traditional rival Argentina. (Note: Livermore and Grant, who cites Livermore's work, both attribute part of this delay to a 1908 earthquake, but no major earthquake hit Chile in that year, cf. List of earthquakes in Chile. However, the Valparaíso earthquake of 1906 caused nearly 4,000 deaths, a tsunami, and a wide swath of destruction over the Chilean capital and surrounding areas. Given this, and at least one primary source's confirmation that the plans were delayed by the Valparaíso earthquake, it seems likely that Livermore's 1908 earthquake was a simple typographical error inadvertently repeated in Grant's account.) While Argentina's principal concern was with Brazil, Chile also wished to respond to Peruvian military acquisitions.

Money for a naval building program was allocated in 1910. Although the Chilean government solicited bids from several armament companies, nearly all believed that a British company would win the contract; the American naval attaché opined that without anything short of a revolution the contracts were destined for the United Kingdom. The Chilean Navy had cultivated extensive ties with the United Kingdom's Royal Navy since the 1830s, when Chilean naval officers were given places on British ships to receive training and experience they could bring back to their country. This relationship had recently been cemented when a British naval mission was requested by Chile and sent in 1911. Still, the American and German governments attempted to swing sentiment to their side by dispatching modern naval vessels (Delaware and Von der Tann, respectively) to Chilean ports. Their efforts were futile, and the design tendered by Armstrong Whitworth was chosen on 25 July 1911.

=== Peru ===
Other South American navies, having limited resources and little expertise in operating large warships, were in no state to respond. The Peruvian Navy, fourth largest on the continent, had been decimated during the Naval campaign of the War of the Pacific against Chile (1879–83). It took the Peruvian government more than twenty years to order new warships—the Almirante Grau class (Almirante Grau and Coronel Bolognesi), scout cruisers delivered in 1906 and 1907. They were augmented by two submarines and a destroyer ordered from France. Almirante Grau was intended to be the fleet's flagship only until a more powerful warship was purchased; along with Coronel Bolognesi, they were to be the "pioneers" of a modern navy. Proceedings reported in 1905 that this new navy would be composed of three Swiftsure-like pre-dreadnoughts, three armored cruisers, six destroyers, and numerous smaller warships, all acquired as part of a nine-year, $7 million outlay.

None of these plans came to fruition. The closest major expansion came in 1912, when the Peruvian Navy had an agreement to acquire an obsolete French armored cruiser in 1912 (Dupuy de Lôme) for three million francs. The Peruvian government paid one of a planned three planned installments, but the purchase came under criticism at home for not being able to change any balance of power with Chile. When a potential cruiser purchase by Ecuador fell through, the Peruvians quit paying for the ship, which was later converted to a merchant ship and scrapped in 1923.

=== Other navies ===
Other South American navies also added smaller vessels to their naval forces in the same time period. The Uruguayan Navy acquired the protected cruiser Montevideo in 1908 and the 1,400-long-ton (1,422 t) torpedo gunboat Uruguay in 1910. The Venezuelan Navy bought an ex-Spanish 1,125-long-ton (1,143 t) protected cruiser, Mariscal Sucre, from the United States in 1912. The Ecuadorian Navy incorporated Libertador Bolívar, a torpedo gunboat bought from Chile, in 1907, complementing its fleet of two avisos, both around 800 long tons (810 t); two small steamers; and one minor coast guard ship.

== New warships ==
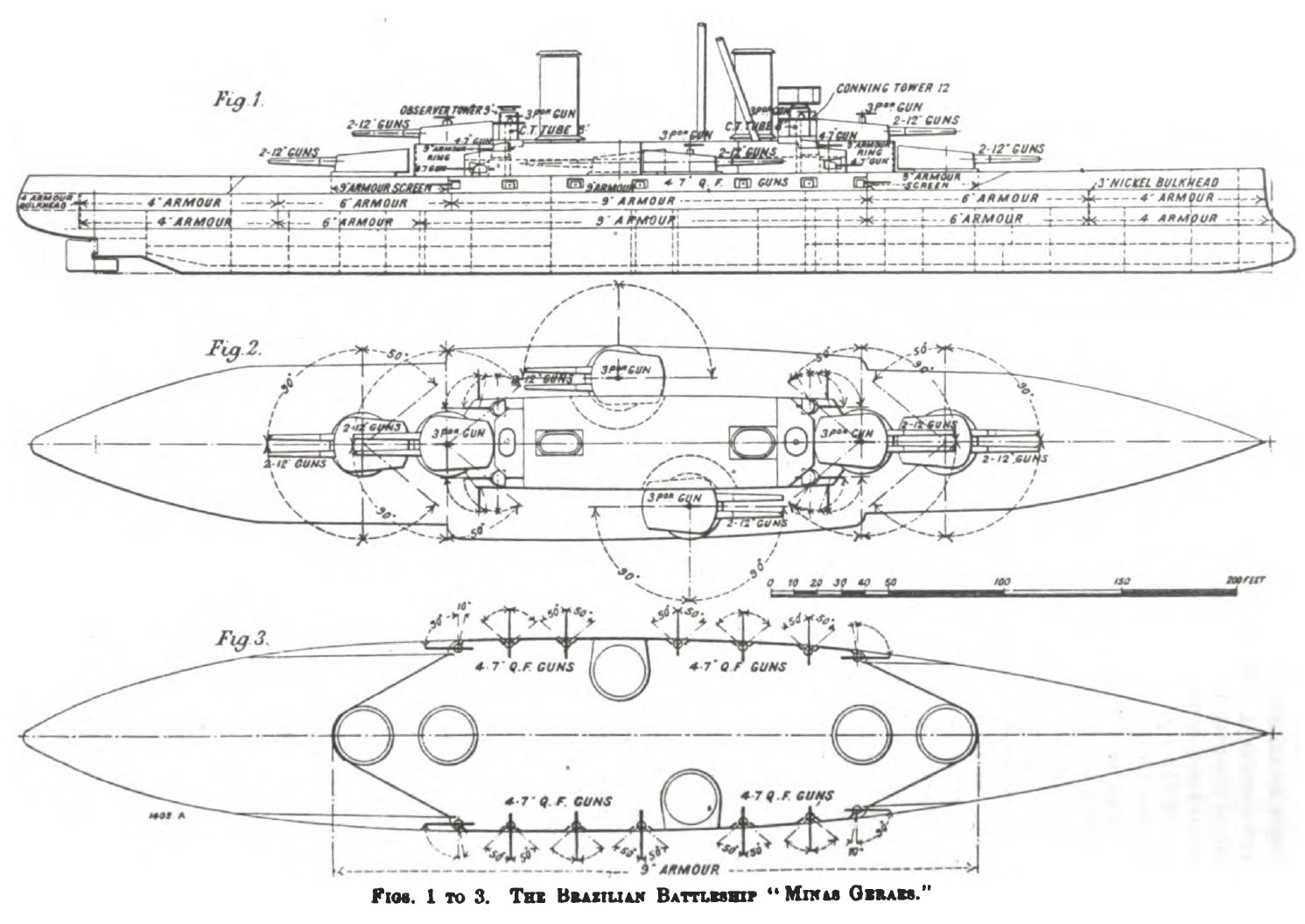
Plans of the Minas Geraes class, showing the armor values (fig. 1) and the theoretically possible radii of the main and secondary batteries (fig. 2 and 3)

Brazil's Minas Geraes, the lead ship, was laid down by Armstrong on 17 April 1907, while its sister São Paulo followed on 30 April at Vickers. Completion of the partial hull needed to launch Minas Geraes was delayed by a five-month strike to 10 September 1908. São Paulo followed on 19 April 1909. Both were christened in front of large crowds by the wife of Francisco Régis de Oliveira, the Brazilian ambassador to the United Kingdom. After fitting-out, the period after a warship's launch where it is completed, Minas Geraes was put through multiple trials of the speed, endurance, efficiency, and weaponry of the ship in September, including what was at that time the heaviest broadside ever fired off a warship. Minas Geraes was completed and handed over to Brazil on 5 January 1910. The trials proved that the blast from the class' superfiring upper turrets would not injure crewmen in the lower turrets. The ship itself managed to reach 21.432 knots (24.664 mph; 39.692 km/h) on an indicated horsepower (ihp) of 27,212. São Paulo followed its classmate in July, after its own trials at the end of May, where the ship reached 21.623 knots (24.883 mph; 40.046 km/h) at 28,645 ihp.

Argentina's Rivadavia was built by the Fore River Ship and Engine Company at its shipyard in Massachusetts. As called for in the final contract, Moreno was subcontracted out to the New York Shipbuilding Corporation of New Jersey. The steel for the ships was largely supplied by the Bethlehem Steel Company of Pennsylvania. Rivadavia was laid down on 25 May 1910—one hundred years after the establishment of the first independent Argentine government, the Primera Junta—and launched on 26 August 1911. Moreno was laid down on 10 July 1910 and launched on 23 September 1911. Construction on both ships took longer than usual, and there were further delays during their sea trials when one of Rivadavia's turbines was damaged and one of Moreno's turbines failed. The two were only officially completed in December 1914 and February 1915. Even the departure of Moreno was marked by mishaps, as the ship sank a barge and ran aground twice.

Chile's Almirante Latorre was launched on 27 November 1913. (Note: Scheina gives 17 November as the launching date, though this appears to be a typographical error.) After the First World War broke out in Europe, work on Almirante Latorre was halted in August 1914, and it was formally purchased on 9 September after the British Cabinet recommended it four days earlier. Almirante Latorre was not forcibly seized like the Ottoman Reşadiye and Sultân Osmân-ı Evvel (ex-Rio de Janeiro), two other ships being built for a foreign navy, as a result of Chile's "friendly neutral" status with the United Kingdom. The British needed to maintain this relationship owing to their dependence on Chilean nitrate imports, which were vital to the British armament industry. The former Chilean ship—the largest vessel built by Armstrong up to that time—was completed on 30 September 1915, commissioned into the Royal Navy on 15 October, and served in that navy in the First World War. Work on the other battleship, Almirante Cochrane, was halted after the outbreak of war. The British purchased the incomplete hulk on 28 February 1918 for conversion to an aircraft carrier, as Almirante Cochrane was the only large and fast hull which was immediately available and capable of being modified into a carrier without major reconstruction. Low priority and quarrels with shipyard workers slowed completion of the ship; it was commissioned into the Royal Navy as Eagle in 1924.

== More Brazilian warships ==
=== Rio de Janeiro ===
After the first Brazilian dreadnought, Minas Geraes, was launched, the Brazilian government began an extended campaign to remove the third dreadnought from the contract because of political—backlash from the Revolt of the Lash coupled with warming relations with Argentina—and economic reasons. After much negotiating and attempts from Armstrong to hold the Brazilian government to the contract, the Brazilians relented, due in part to lower bond rates that made it possible for the government to borrow the necessary money. Rio de Janeiro was laid down for the first time in March 1910.

Agincourt depicted prior to its British modifications, which included removing the flying bridge seen here

By May, the Brazilian government asked Armstrong to stop work on the new warship and to submit new designs which took in the most recent advance in naval technology, super-dreadnoughts. Eustace Tennyson-d'Eyncourt served as Armstrong's liaison to Brazil. The 1911 Encyclopædia Britannica specifies this design as a 655-foot (200 m) long overall, 32,000-long-ton (33,000 t) ship mounting twelve 14-inch guns and costing near £3,000,000. The many requests made by the Brazilian Navy for minor changes delayed the contract signing until 10 October 1910, and the battleship's keel laying was delayed further by a labor dispute with the Worshipful Company of Shipwrights, which led to a lockout. During these delays, a new Minister of the Navy, Admiral Marques Leão, was appointed to replace Alencar—an important development, as the contract stipulated that the design could proceed only with the approval of the new Minister. Again, however, the Brazilian Navy found itself torn between two schools of thought: Leão and others in the navy favored a reversion to the 12-inch gun, but others, led by the outgoing Minister of the Navy (Alencar) and the head of the Brazilian naval commission in the United Kingdom (Rear Admiral Duarte Huet de Bacelar Pinto Guedes), were strongly in favor of obtaining the ship with the largest armament—in this case, a design drawn up by Bacellar, carrying eight 16-inch guns, six 9.4-inch guns, and fourteen 6-inch guns.

D'Eyncourt, who had departed Brazil in October immediately after the contract was signed, returned in March 1911 to display the various design options available to the Brazilian Navy. Armstrong evidently thought the second faction would prevail, so he also took with him everything needed to close a deal on Bacellar's design. By mid-March, Armstrong's contacts in Brazil reported that Leão had convinced the recently elected President Hermes Rodrigues da Fonseca to cancel the design with twelve 14-inch guns in favor of a smaller ship. The credit may not have laid with Leão alone, though; da Fonseca was already dealing with multiple issues. Most importantly, he had to deal with the fallout from a large naval revolt in November 1910 (the Revolt of the Lash), which had seen three of the new vessels just purchased by the navy, along with one older coast-defense ship, mutiny against the use of corporal punishment in the navy.

To make matters worse, the dreadnoughts' expense combined with loan payments and a worsening economy led to growing government debt compounded by budget deficits. By one measure of Brazil's GDP per capita, income in the country rose from $718 in 1905 to a high of $836 in 1911 before declining over the next three years to a low of $780 in 1914 (both measured in 1990 international dollars). It did not fully recover until after the First World War. At the same time, Brazil's external and internal debt reached $500 and $335 million (respectively, in contemporaneous dollar amounts) by 1913, partly through rising deficits, which were $22 million in 1908 and $47 million by 1912. In May, the president commented negatively on the new ship:

When I assumed office, I found that my predecessor had signed a contract for the building of the battleship Rio de Janeiro, a vessel of 32,000 tons, with an armament of 14-inch guns. Considerations of every kind pointed to the inconvenience of acquiring such a vessel and to the revision of the contract in the sense of reducing the tonnage. This was done, and we shall possess a powerful unit which will not be built on exaggerated lines such as have not as yet stood the time of experience.

D'Eyncourt probably avoided proposing any design with 16-inch guns when he saw the political situation. In meetings with Leão, designs of only ten 12-inch guns mounted on the centerline were quickly rejected, even though their broadside was as strong as that of the Minas Geraes class, but a design with no less than fourteen 12-inch guns emerged as the frontrunner. Author David Topliss attributes this to political necessity, as he believed the Minister of the Navy could not validate purchasing a seemingly less-powerful dreadnought than the Minas Geraes class: with larger guns ruled out, the only remaining choice was a larger number of guns.

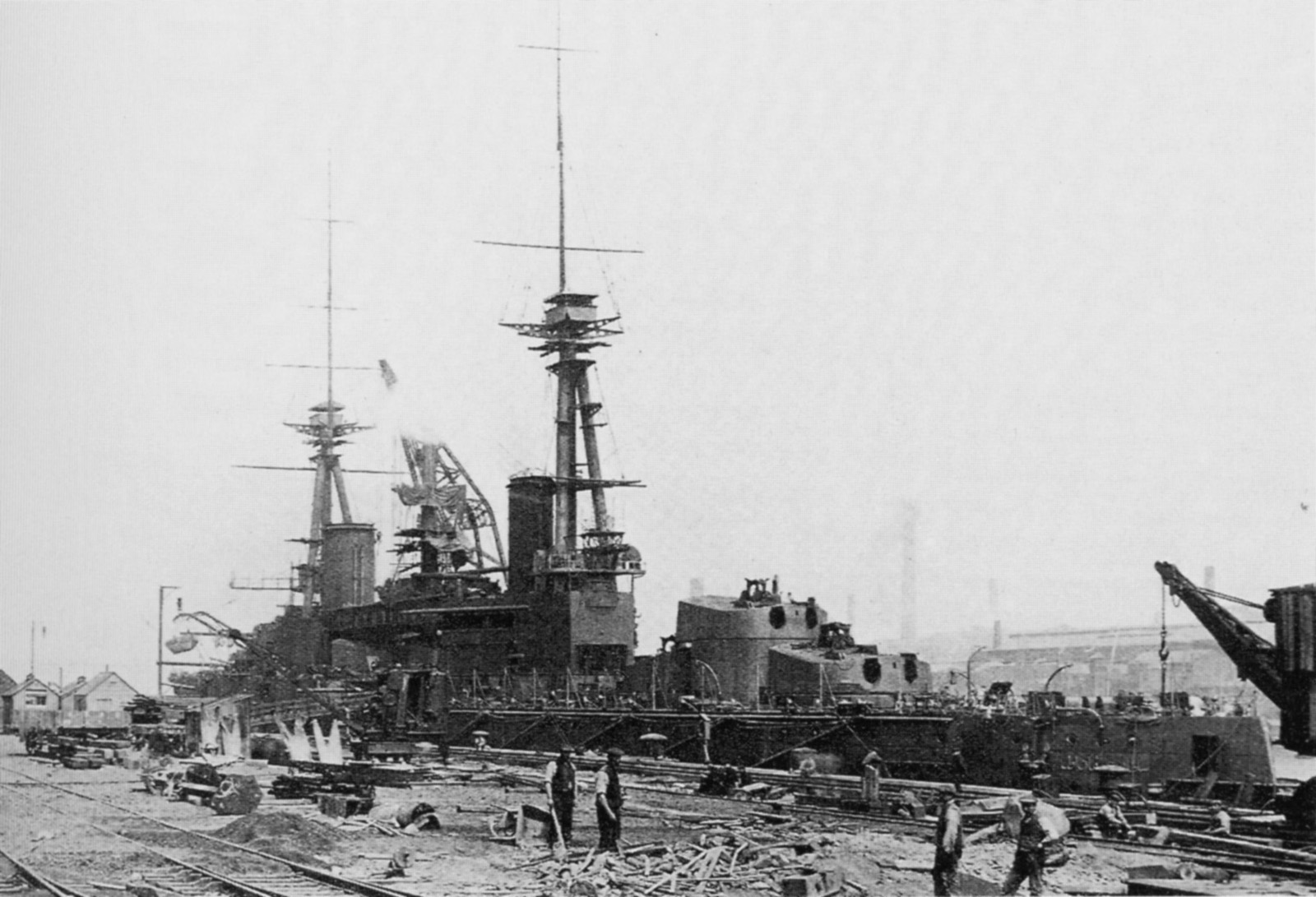
Sultân Osmân-ı Evvel, previously Rio de Janeiro and soon to be Agincourt, fitting-out

After numerous requests for design alterations from the Brazilian Navy were accommodated or rejected, a contract was signed for a ship with fourteen 12-inch guns on 3 June 1911 for £2,675,000, and Rio de Janeiro's keel was laid for the fourth time on 14 September. It did not take long for the Brazilian government to reconsider their decision again; by mid-1912, battleships with 14-inch guns were under construction, and suddenly it seemed that Rio de Janeiro would be outclassed upon completion. Making matters worse, a European depression after the end of the Second Balkan War in August 1913 reduced Brazil's ability to obtain foreign loans. This coincided with a collapse in Brazil's coffee and rubber exports, the latter due to the loss of the Brazilian rubber monopoly to British plantations in the Far East. The price of coffee declined by 20 percent and Brazilian exports of it dropped 12.5 percent between 1912 and 1913; rubber saw a similar decline of 25 and 36.6 percent, respectively. The Brazilian Navy later claimed that selling Rio de Janeiro was a tactical decision, so they could have two divisions of battleships: two with 12-inch guns (the Minas Geraes class), and two with 15-inch guns.

Armstrong studied whether replacing the 12-inch guns with seven 15-inch guns would be feasible, but Brazil was probably already attempting to sell the ship. In the tension building up to the First World War, many countries, including Russia, Italy, and the two participants in the Greco–Ottoman dreadnought race, were interested in purchasing the ship. While Russia quickly dropped out, the Italians seemed close to purchasing the ship until the French government decided to back the Greeks—rather than allow the Italians, who were the principal naval rivals of the French, to obtain the ship. The Greek government made an offer for the original purchase price plus an additional £50,000, but as the Greeks worked to obtain an initial installment, the Ottoman government was also making offers.

The Brazilian government rejected an Ottoman proposal to swap ships, with Brazil's Rio de Janeiro going to the Ottomans and Reşadiye going to Brazil, presumably with some amount of money. The Brazilian government would accept only a monetary offer. Lacking this, the Ottomans were forced to find a loan. Fortunately for them, they were able to obtain one from a French banker acting independent of his government, and the Ottoman Navy secured the Rio de Janeiro on 29 December 1913 for £1,200,000 as-is. (Note: This acquisition alarmed the Greek government, who redoubled efforts to acquire another South American dreadnought. cf. South American dreadnought race § Attempted foreign purchases and sales.) As part of the purchase contract, the remainder of the ship was constructed with £2,340,000 in Ottoman money. Renamed Sultân Osmân-ı Evvel, it was eventually taken over by the British shortly after the beginning of the First World War, serving with the Royal Navy as HMS Agincourt. (Note: This action is commonly cited as a major reason in the Ottoman decision to join the Central Powers and enter the First World War, but historians have disputed this claim, using as evidence the signing of a secret alliance between the German and Ottoman Empires on 2 August 1914 and the lack of any response to the United Kingdom's offer of compensation for the ship.)

=== Riachuelo ===
After selling Rio de Janeiro, the Brazilian government asked Armstrong and Vickers to prepare designs for a new battleship, something strongly supported by the Navy League of Brazil (Liga Maritima). Armstrong agreed to construct the ship without any further payments from Brazil. They replied with at least fourteen designs, six from Vickers (December 1913 through March 1914) and eight from Armstrong (February 1914). Vickers' designs varied between eight and ten 15-inch and eight 16-inch guns, with speeds between 22 and 25 knots (the lower-end ships having mixed firing, the higher using oil), and displacements between 26,000 tonnes (26,000 long tons) and 30,500 tonnes (30,000 long tons). Armstrong took two basic designs, one with eight and the other with ten 15-inch guns, and varied their speed and firing. (Note: Topliss (1985), in writing a design history of the four Brazilian dreadnoughts, makes no mention of Vanterpool's (1969) article, which detailed four substantially different designs prepared in October 1913 by Armstrong. Sturton (1970), whose article was written in direct reply to Vanterpool, found that designs were submitted after that date and that one, bearing little resemblance to anything uncovered by Vanterpool, was ordered. Topliss, on whose research this paragraph is largely based, appears to have expanded upon Sturton's work, but does not include the designs detailed by Vanterpool, even though his article is listed in Topliss' sources.)

While most secondary sources do not mention that Brazil ordered a battleship, with the ship's entry in the warship encyclopedia Conway's All the World's Fighting Ships even remarking that "Brazil had not selected from the four design variations," the Brazilian government chose what was labeled as Design 781, the first of the eight 15-inch designs tendered by Armstrong, which also shared characteristics with the Queen Elizabeth and Revenge classes then being built for the United Kingdom. They placed an order for one ship of this design, to be named Riachuelo, at the Armstrong Whitworth shipyard in Elswick on 12 May 1914. Some preliminary gathering of materials was completed for a planned keel laying date of 10 September, but the beginning of the First World War in August 1914 delayed plans. Riachuelo was officially suspended on 14 January 1915 and canceled on 13 May 1915, although at least one contemporary source stated that there was a "temporarily suspended" contract for the fourth dreadnought still out as of 1922.

== Decline ==
=== Brazilian naval revolt ===
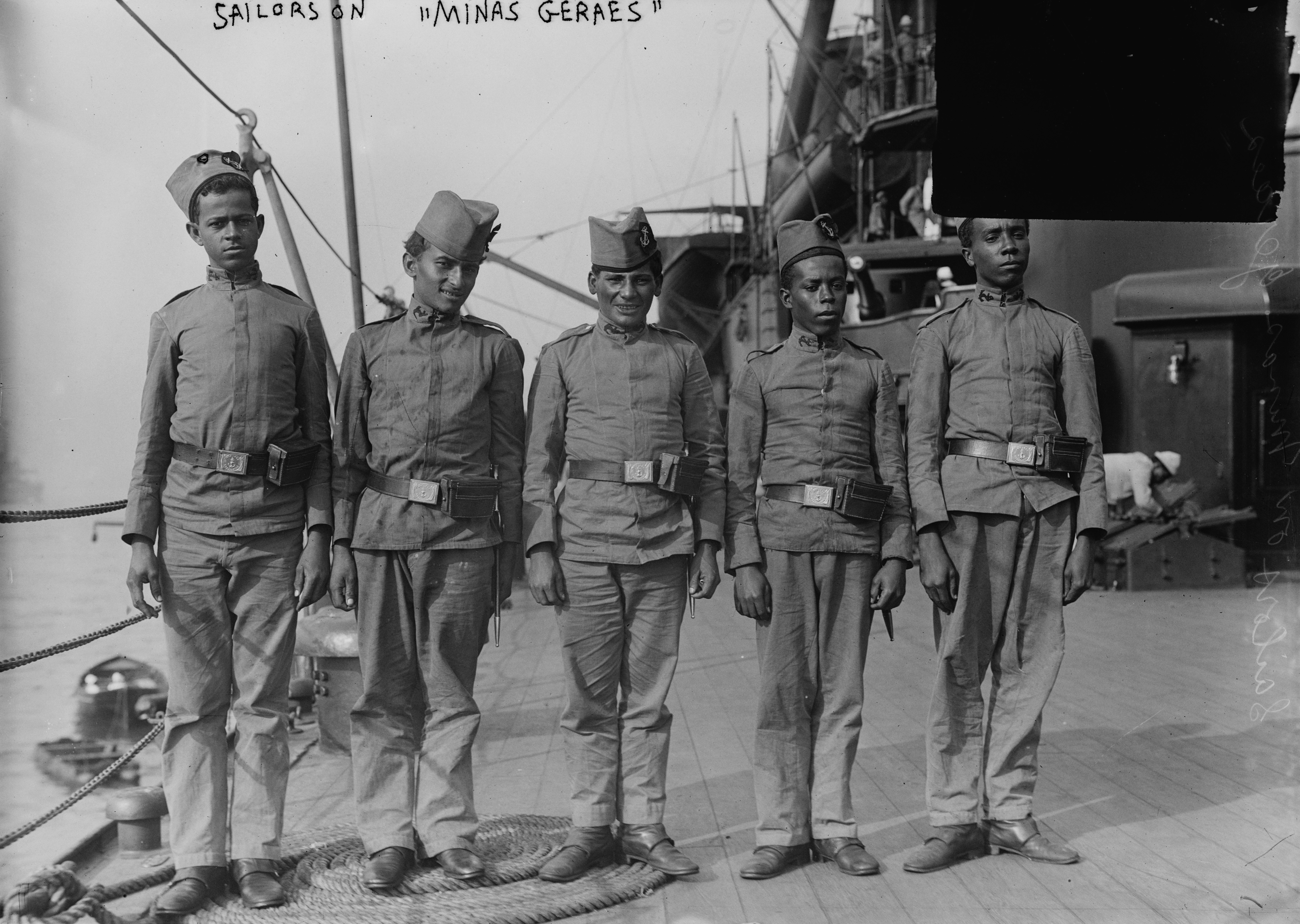
Pardo and preto Brazilian marines pose for a photographer on board Minas Geraes, probably during the ship's visit to the United States in early 1913.

In late November 1910, a large naval revolt, later named the Revolt of the Lash, broke out in Rio de Janeiro. (Note: Other English translations include the "Revolt of the Whip" or the "Revolt against the Lash.") The tension was kindled by the racial makeup of the navy's regular crewmembers, who were heavily black or mixed-race, whereas their officers were mostly white. The Baron of Rio Branco commented: "For the recruitment of marines and enlisted men, we bring aboard the dregs of our urban centers, the most worthless lumpen, without preparation of any sort. Ex-slaves and the sons of slaves make up our ships' crews, most of them dark-skinned or dark-skinned mulattos."

This kind of impressment, combined with the heavy use of corporal punishment for even minor offenses, meant that relations between the black crews and white officers was tepid at best. Crewmen aboard Minas Geraes began planning for a revolt in 1910. They chose João Cândido, an experienced sailor, as their leader. The mutiny was delayed several times by disagreements among the participants. In a major meeting on 13 November, some of the revolutionaries expressed a desire to revolt when the president would be inaugurated (15 November), but another leader, Francisco Dias Martins, talked them out of the idea, insisting that their demands would be overshadowed by a perceived rebellion against the political system as a whole. The immediate catalyst for their revolt came on 21 November 1910, when an Afro-Brazilian sailor, Marcelino Rodrigues Menezes, was brutally flogged 250 times for insubordination. (Note: There is some scholarly confusion over the exact date of Menezes' lashing. Morgan (2003) says that it occurred at dawn on 16 November and the span between whipping and revolt was due to the need for additional planning and organization. Love (2012), the account followed here, states that Menezes was whipped on the night of 21 November, with the revolt starting around 10 p.m. on the 22nd. Both, however, agree that the incident was the immediate cause of the uprising.) A Brazilian government observer, former navy captain José Carlos de Carvalho, stated that the sailor's back looked like "a mullet sliced open for salting."

The revolt began aboard Minas Geraes at around 10 pm on 22 November; the ship's commander and several loyal crewmen were murdered in the process. Soon after, São Paulo, the new cruiser Bahia, the coast-defense ship Deodoro, the minelayer República, the training ship Benjamin Constant, and the torpedo boats Tamoio and Tymbira all revolted with relatively little violence. The first four ships represented the newest and strongest ships in the navy; Minas Geraes, São Paulo, and Bahia had been completed and commissioned only months before. Deodoro was twelve years old and had recently undergone a refit. The crews of the smaller warships made up only two percent of the mutineers, and some moved to the largest ships after the revolt began.

Key warships that remained in government hands included the old cruiser Almirante Barroso, Bahia's sister Rio Grande do Sul, and the eight new destroyers of the Pará class. Their crews were in a state of flux at the time: with nearly half of the navy's enlisted men in Rio at that time in open revolt, naval officers were suspicious of even those who remained loyal to the government. These suspicions were perhaps well-placed, given that radio operators on loyal ships passed on operational plans to the mutineers. Enlisted men on ships that remained in government hands were reduced wherever possible, and officers took over all of the positions that would be involved in direct combat. Further complicating matters were weapon supplies, such as the destroyer's torpedoes. These could not be fired without firing caps, yet the caps were not where they were supposed to be. When they were located and delivered, they did not fit the newer torpedoes on board the destroyers. The correct caps were fitted only 48 hours after the rebellion began.

Cândido and his fellow sailors demanded an end to what they called the "slavery" being practised by the navy, most notably the continued use of whipping despite its ban in every other Western nation. Though navy officers and the president were staunchly opposed to any sort of amnesty and made plans to attack the rebel-held ships, many legislators were supportive. Over the next three days, both houses of the Brazilian National Congress, led by the influential senator Ruy Barbosa, passed a general bill granting amnesty to all involved and ending the use of corporal punishment.

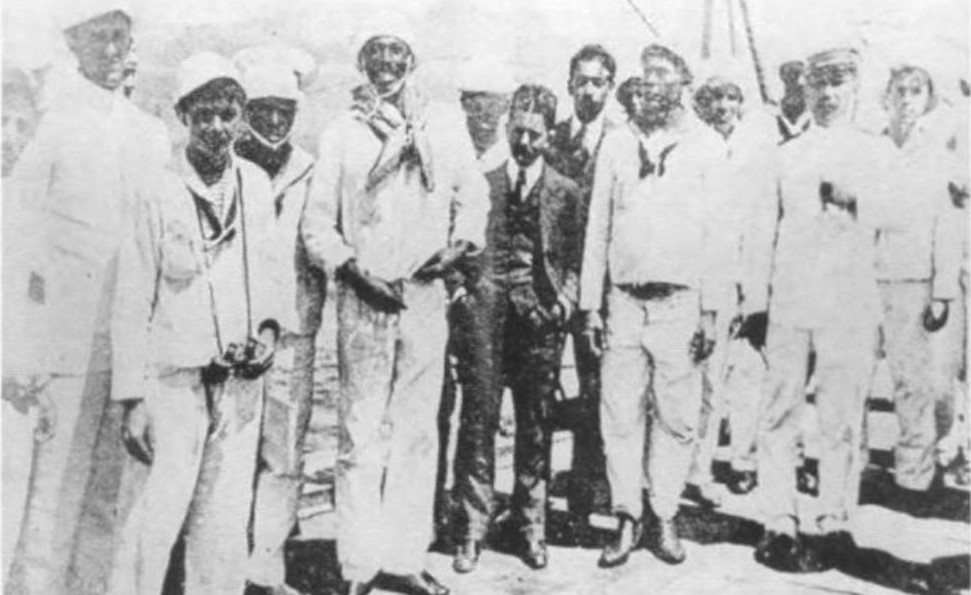
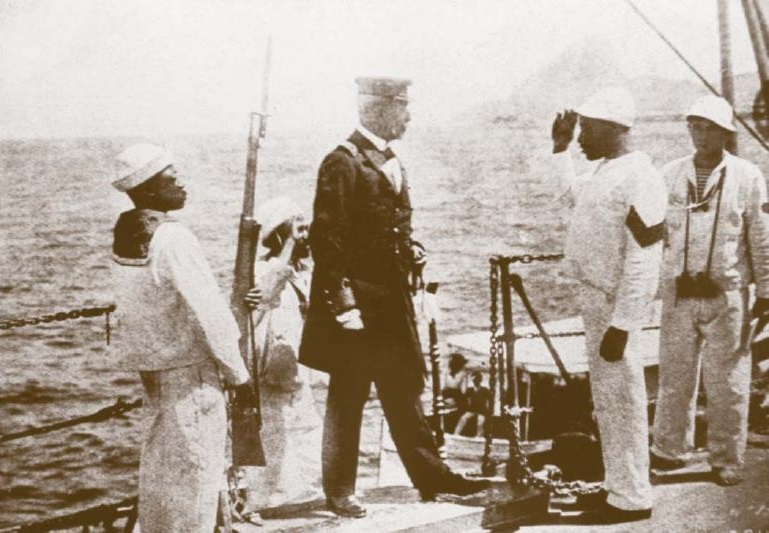
João Cândido with reporters, officers and sailors on board Minas Geraes on 26 November 1910, the final day of the revolt (left); João Cândido handing control of the ship back to the navy (right).

In the aftermath of the revolt, the two Brazilian dreadnoughts were disarmed by the removal of their guns' breechblocks. The revolt and consequent state of the navy, which was essentially unable to operate for fear of another rebellion, caused many leading Brazilians, including the president, prominent politicians like Barbosa and the Baron of Rio Branco, and the editor of the most respected newspaper in Brazil, Jornal do Commercio, to question the use of the new ships and support their sale to a foreign country. (Note: On the status of Jornal do Commercio within Brazil, see Love, Revolt, 3.) The British ambassador to Brazil, W.H.D. Haggard, was ecstatic at Rio Branco's about-face, saying "This is indeed a wonderful surrender on the part of the man who was answerable for the purchase and who looked upon them as the most cherished offspring of his policy." Shortly before the vote on the amnesty bill, Ruy Barbosa emphatically outlined his opposition to the ships:

Let me, in conclusion, point out two profound lessons of the bitter situation in which we find ourselves. The first is that a military government is not one whit more able to save the country from the vicissitudes of war nor any braver or resourceful in meeting them than a civil government. The second is that the policy of great armaments has no place on the American continent. At least on our part and the part of the nations which surround us, the policy which we ought to follow with joy and hope is that of drawing closer international ties through the development of commercial relations, the peace and friendship of all the peoples who inhabit the countries of America.

The experience of Brazil in this respect is decisive. All of the forces employed for twenty years in the perfecting of the means of our national defense have served, after all, to turn upon our own breasts these successive attempts at revolt. International war has not yet come to the doors of our republic. Civil war has come many times, armed by these very weapons which we have so vainly prepared for our defense against a foreign enemy. Let us do away with these ridiculous and perilous great armaments, securing international peace by means rather of just and equitable relations with our neighbors. On the American continent, at least, it is not necessary to maintain a 'peace armada'; that hideous cancer which is devouring continuously the vitals of the nations of Europe.

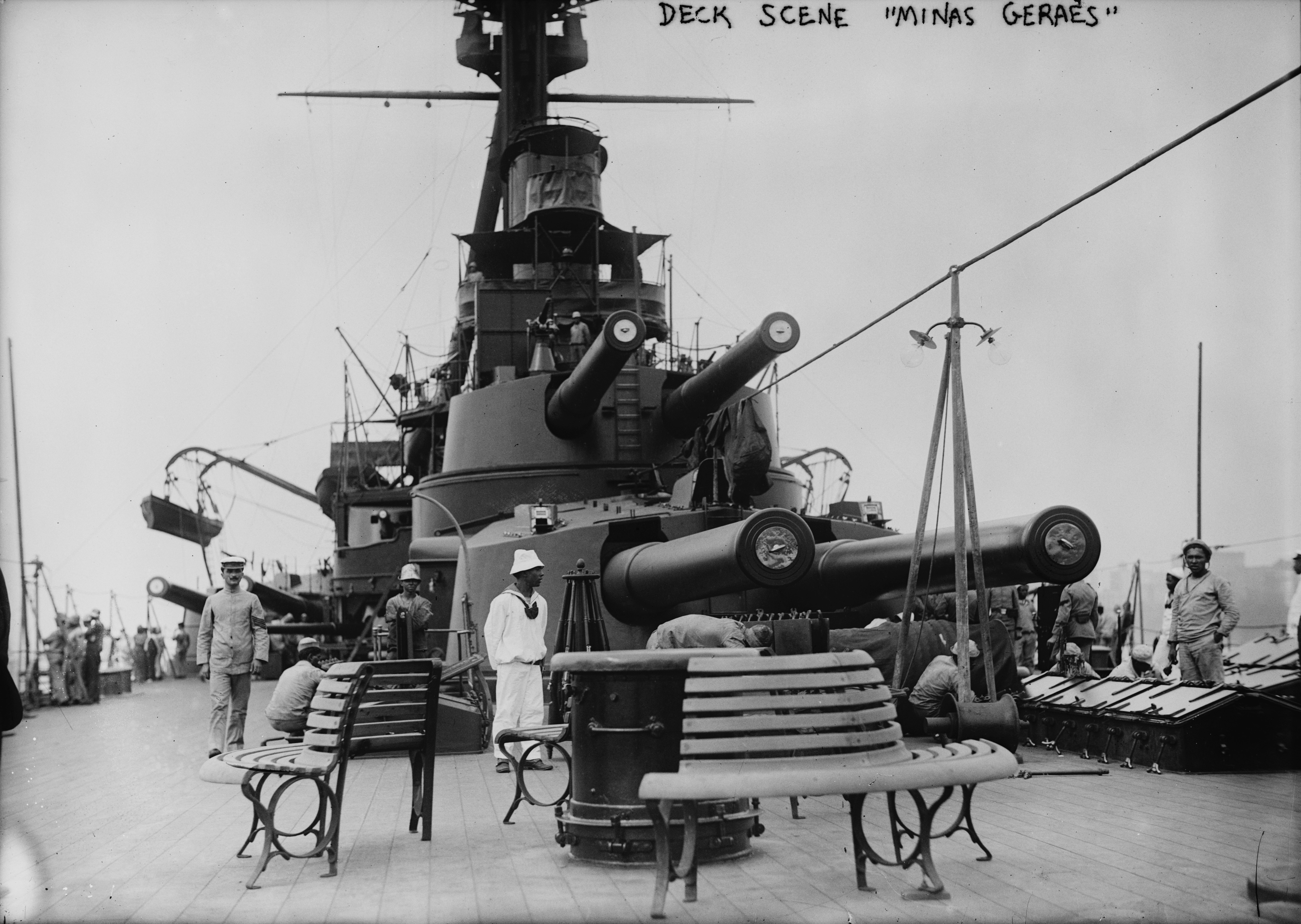
Minas Geraes, seen from the stern of the ship

In the end, the president and cabinet decided against selling the ships because they feared it would hurt them politically. This came despite a consensus agreeing that the ships should be disposed of, possibly to fund smaller warships capable of traversing Brazil's many rivers. The executive's apprehension was heightened by Barbosa's speech given before the revolt's end, as he also used the occasion to attack the government, or what he called the "brutal militaristic regime". Still, the Brazilians ordered Armstrong to cease working towards laying down their third dreadnought, which induced the Argentine government to not pick up their contractual option for a third dreadnought, and the United States' ambassador to Brazil cabled home to state that the Brazilian desire for naval preeminence in Latin America was quelled, though this proved to be short-lived.

Although the Minas Geraes class remained in Brazilian hands, the mutiny had a clear detrimental effect on the navy's readiness: by 1912, an Armstrong agent stated that the ships were in terrible condition, with rust already forming on turrets and boilers. The agent believed it would cost the Brazilian Navy around £700,000 to address these issues. Haggard tersely commented, "These ships are absolutely useless to Brazil", a sentiment echoed by Proceedings. Despite the government's refusal to sell the two Minas Geraes-class ships and subsequent support for acquiring Rio de Janeiro, some historians credit the rebellion, combined with the Baron of Rio Branco's death in 1912, as major factors in the Brazilian government's decision (which was possibly made by January 1913, but certainly by September) to sell the ship to the Ottomans.

=== Attempted foreign purchases and sales ===
After Rio de Janeiro was purchased by the Ottoman Empire, the Argentine government bowed to popular demand and began to seek a buyer for their two dreadnoughts. The money received in return would have been devoted to internal improvements. Three bills directing that the battleships be sold were introduced into the Argentine National Congress in mid-1914, but all were defeated. Still, the British and Germans expressed worries that the ships could be sold to a belligerent nation, while the Russian, Austrian, Ottoman, Italian, and Greek governments were all reportedly interested in buying both ships.

The Greek government, embroiled in a dreadnought race with the Ottoman Empire, was particularly keen to acquire one of the South American dreadnoughts. The New-York Tribune reported in late April 1913 that the Argentine government had rejected a Greek $17.5 million offer for Moreno alone, which would have netted them a large profit over the original construction cost of the ships ($12 million). The Greek appetite to acquire one of these ships only grew after the surprise Ottoman acquisition of Rio de Janeiro gave them what one contemporary commentator called "assure[d] naval superiority". To them, the problem was clear: with Rio de Janeiro, the Ottomans would possess two dreadnoughts by the end of 1914 (the other being Reşadiye, later taken over by the British and renamed Erin). To oppose them, Greece would have only Salamis, scheduled for completion months afterwards (March 1915), and two utterly obsolete pre-dreadnoughts, Kilkis and Lemnos, purchased from the United States in May 1914 to avert what seemed to be an imminent war.

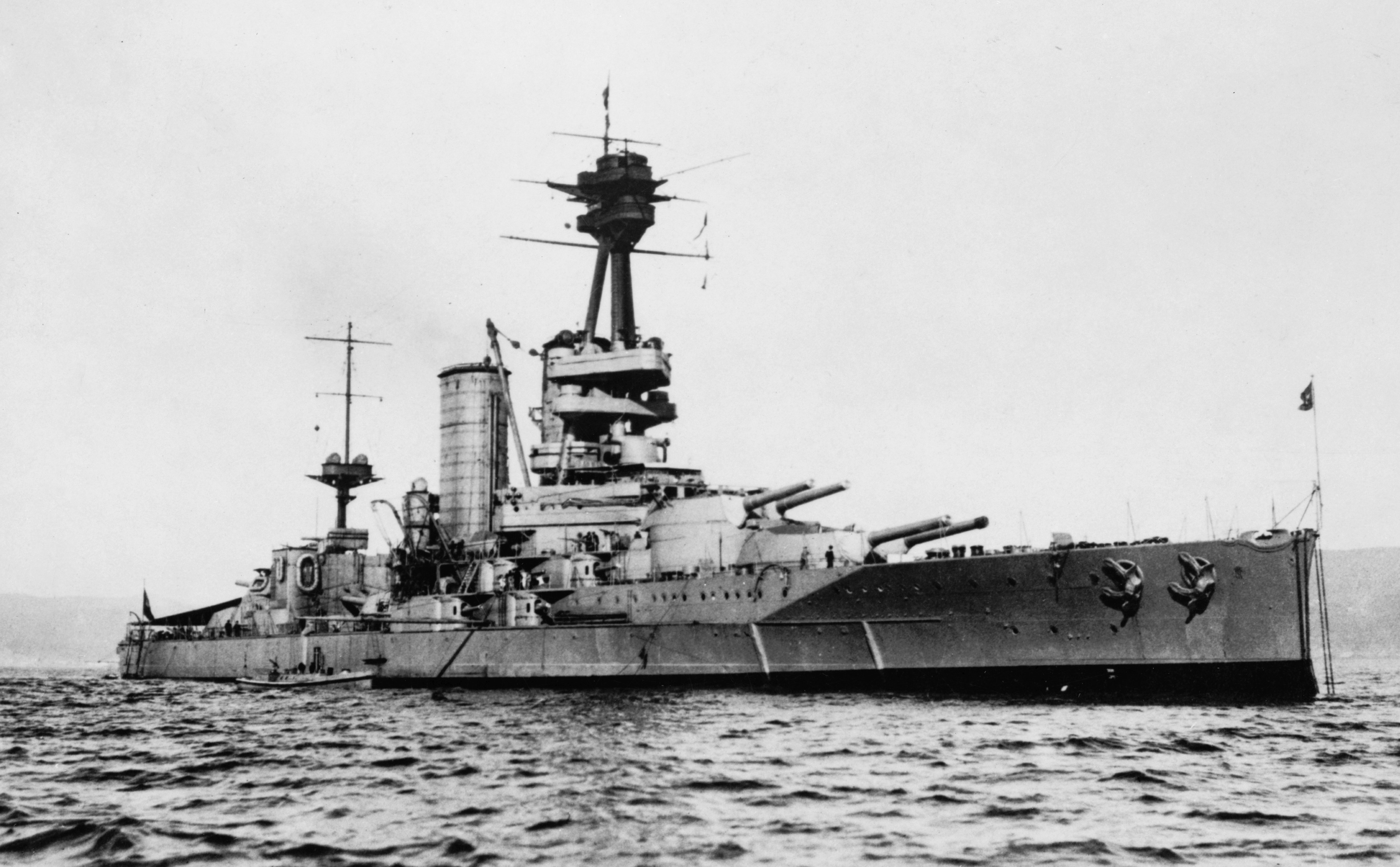
Chile's Almirante Latorre in December 1921

The United States, worried that its neutrality would not be respected and its technology would be released for study to a foreign country, put diplomatic pressure on the Argentine government to keep the ships, which it eventually did. Meanwhile, news outlets also reported in late 1913 and early 1914 that Greece had reached an accord to purchase Chile's first battleship as a counterbalance to the Ottoman acquisition of Rio de Janeiro. Despite a developing sentiment within Chile to sell one or both of the dreadnoughts, no deal was struck; the Chilean government baldly stated that they believed they had a strategic need for the vessels. (Note: In an assertion later disproven by historian Matthew S. Seligmann, Sean McMeekin argued in 2011 that the Ottoman Empire had struck a deal to purchase Almirante Latorre, Rivadavia, and Moreno. This surprise was allegedly a reason why Russia was keen to start a conflict to break up the Ottoman state as soon as 1914: they wanted to strike before they lost naval supremacy in the Black Sea. However, documentary evidence shows that the ships were never particularly close to being sold despite legitimate attempts to purchase them.)

In each of the countries involved in the South American dreadnought arms race, movements arose that advocated the sale of the dreadnoughts to redirect the substantial amounts of money involved toward what they viewed as more worthy pursuits. These costs were rightfully viewed as enormous. After the Minas Geraes class was ordered, a Brazilian newspaper equated the initial purchase cost for the original three ships as equaling 3,125 miles of railroad tracks or 30,300 homesteads. Naval historian Robert Scheina put the price at £6,110,100 without accounting for ammunition, which was £605,520, or necessary upgrades to docks, which was £832,000. Costs for maintenance and related issues, which in the first five years of Minas Geraes's and São Paulo's commissioned lives was about 60 percent of the initial cost, only added to the already staggering sum of money. The two Rivadavias were purchased for nearly a fifth of the Argentine government's yearly income, a figure which did not include the later in-service costs. Historian Robert K. Massie rounded the figure to a full quarter of each government's annual income.

In addition, the nationalistic sentiments that exacerbated the naval arms race gave way to slowing economies and negative public opinions which came to support investing inside the country instead. Commenting on this, the United States' Minister to Chile, Henry Prather Fletcher, wrote to Secretary of State William Jennings Bryan: "Since the naval rivalry began in 1910, financial conditions, which were none too good then, have grown worse; and as time approaches for the final payment, feeling has been growing in these countries that perhaps they are much more in need of money than of battleships."

== Aftermath ==
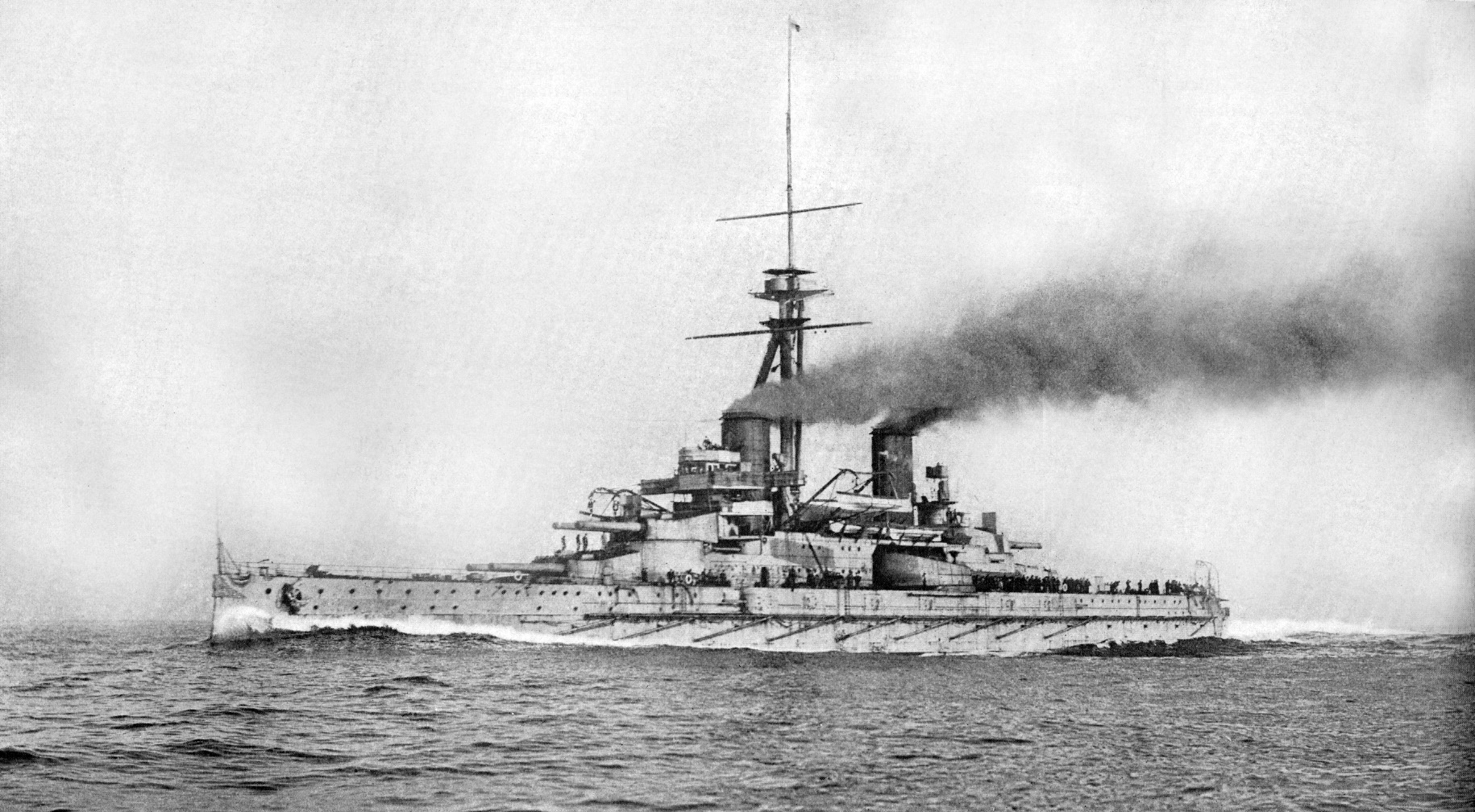
Minas Geraes before it was modernized in New York in 1920–21 and in Brazil in 1931–38. The ship was built with two funnels to release the exhaust from the dual-burning (both coal and oil) boilers away from the ship.

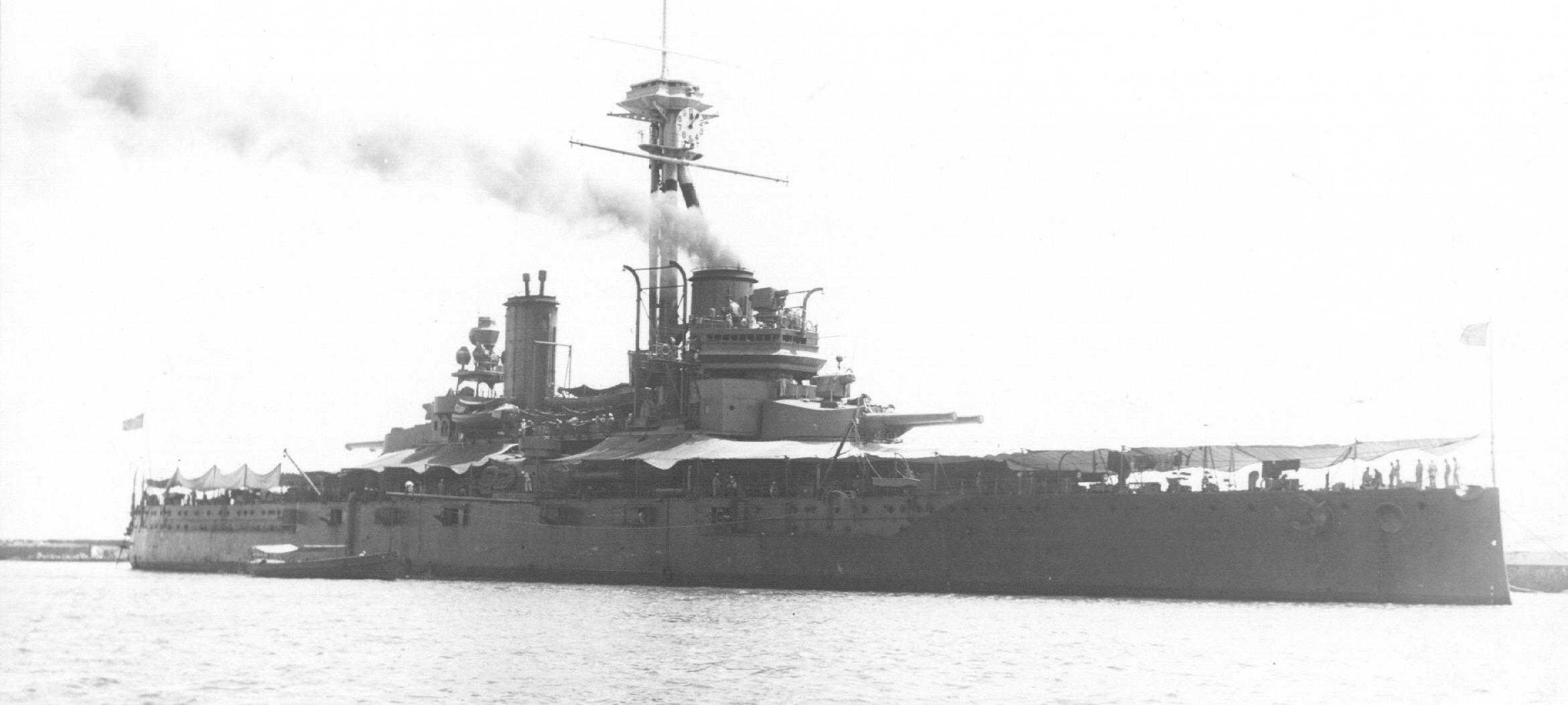
Either Minas Geraes or São Paulo after a post-First World War modernization. The bridge is now enclosed, and a rebuilt conning tower with a range clock (used in fire control) have been added to the tripod mast. Awnings shading the deck are obscuring the main battery in this photo.

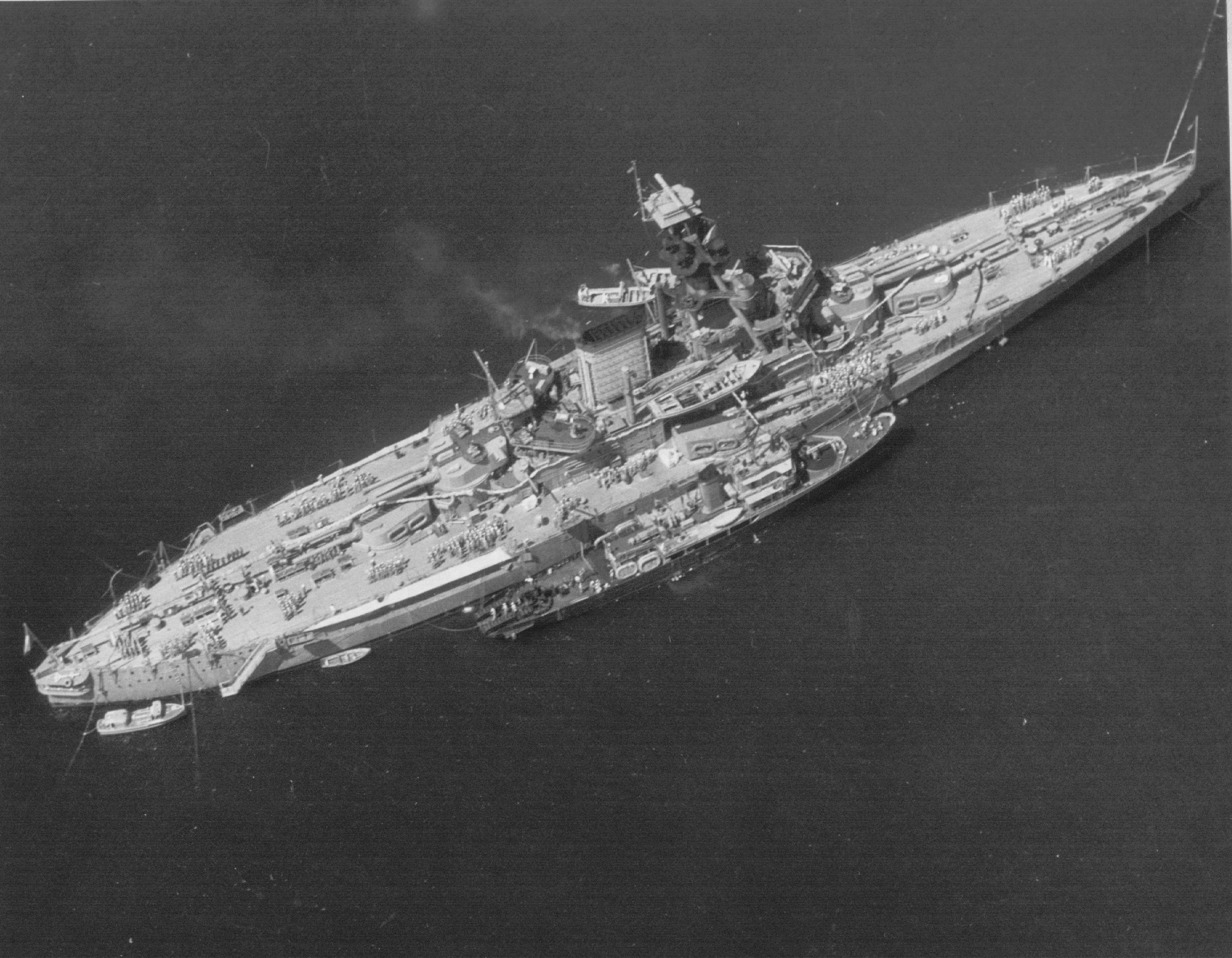
Minas Geraes after its second modernization in the 1930s. The ship was converted to full oil firing during the 1930s, and the consequent loss in boilers, from eighteen to six, allowed the exhaust to be trunked into a single funnel. Other modifications made during this period, including improved fire controls, were less visually evident.

The First World War effectively ended the dreadnought race, as all three countries suddenly found themselves unable to acquire additional warships. After the conflict, the race never resumed, but many plans for post-war naval expansions and improvements were postulated by the Argentine, Brazilian, and Chilean governments.

The Brazilians modernized Minas Geraes, São Paulo, and the two cruisers acquired under the 1904 plan, Bahia and Rio Grande do Sul, between 1918 and 1926. This was sorely needed, as all four ships were not ready to fight a modern war. Although the Brazilian government intended to send São Paulo overseas for service in the Grand Fleet, both it and Minas Geraes had not been modernized since entering service, meaning they were without essential equipment like modern fire control. Maintenance on the two ships had also been neglected, which was most clearly illustrated when São Paulo was sent to New York for modernization: fourteen of its eighteen boilers broke down, and the ship required the assistance of the American battleship Nebraska and cruiser Raleigh to continue the voyage. The two cruisers were in poor condition and were only able to steam at a top speed of 18 knots (21 mph; 33 km/h) thanks to a desperate need for new condensers and boiler tubes. With repairs, both participated in the war as part of Brazil's main naval contribution to the conflict.

The Brazilian Navy also made plans to acquire additional ships in the 1920s and 30s, but both were sharply reduced from the original proposals. In 1924, they contemplated constructing a relatively modest number of warships, including a heavy cruiser, five destroyers, and five submarines. In the same year, the newly arrived American naval mission, led by Rear Admiral Carl Theodore Vogelgesang, tendered a naval expansion plan of 151,000 tons, divided between battleships (70,000), cruisers (60,000), destroyers (15,000), and submarines (6,000). The United States' State Department, led by Secretary of State Charles Evans Hughes and fresh from negotiating the Washington Naval Treaty, was not keen on seeing another dreadnought race, so Hughes quickly moved to thwart the efforts of the mission. Only one Italian-built submarine, Humaytá, was acquired during this time.

By the 1930s, the international community believed that the bulk of the Brazilian Navy was "obsolete" and were old enough to no longer be "considered effective". Still, Minas Geraes was modernized a second time at the Rio de Janeiro Navy Arsenal from June 1931 to April 1938. (Note: Other sources give different dates for the modernization, such as 1931 to 1935, and 1934 to 1937.) Plans to give similar treatment to São Paulo were dropped due to the ship's poor material condition. During the same period, the Brazilian government looked into purchasing cruisers from the United States Navy but ran into the restrictions of the Washington and London Naval Treaties, which placed restrictions on the sale of used warships to foreign countries. The Brazilians eventually contracted for six destroyers from the United Kingdom. (Note: These were taken over after the beginning of the Second World War and became the Havant class.) In the interim, a plan to lease six destroyers from the United States was abandoned after it was met with strong opposition from both international and American institutions. Three Marcílio Dias-class destroyers, based on the American Mahan class, were laid down in Brazil with six minelayers, all of which were launched between 1939 and 1941. Though both programs required foreign assistance and were consequently delayed by the war, all nine ships were completed by 1944.

In the 1920s, nearly all of the major warships of the Argentine Navy were obsolete; aside from Rivadavia and Moreno, the newest major warship had been constructed at the end of the nineteenth century. The Argentine government recognized this, and as part of holding on to their naval superiority in the region, they sent Rivadavia and Moreno to the United States in 1924 and 1926 to be modernized. In addition, in 1926 the Argentine Congress allotted 75 million gold pesos for a naval building program. This resulted in the acquisition of three cruisers (the Italian-built Veinticinco de Mayo class and the British-built La Argentina), twelve destroyers (the Spanish-built Churruca class and the British-built Mendoza/Buenos Aires classes), and three submarines (the Italian-built Santa Fe class).

Chile began to seek additional ships to bolster its fleet in 1919, and the United Kingdom eagerly offered many of its surplus warships. This action worried nearby nations, who feared that a Chilean attempt to become the region's most powerful navy would destabilize the area and start another naval arms race. Chile asked for Canada and Eagle, the two battleships they ordered before the war, but the cost of converting the latter back to a battleship was too high. Planned replacements included the two remaining Invincible-class battlecruisers, but a leak to the press of the secret negotiations to acquire them caused an uproar within Chile itself over the value of such ships. In the end, Chile bought only Canada and four destroyers in April 1920—all ships that had been ordered from British yards by the Chilean government before 1914 but were purchased by the Royal Navy after the British entered the First World War—for relatively low prices. Canada, for instance, was sold for just £1,000,000, less than half of what had been required to construct the ship.

Over the next several years, the Chileans continued to acquire more ships from the British, like six destroyers (the Serrano class) and three submarines (the Capitan O'Brien class). Almirante Latorre was modernized in the United Kingdom from 1929 to 1931 at the Devonport Dockyard. A recession and a major naval revolt then led to the battleship's de facto inactivation in the early 1930s. In the late 1930s, the Chilean government inquired into the possibility of constructing an 8,600-long-ton (8,700 t) cruiser in the United Kingdom, Italy, Germany, or Sweden, but this did not lead to an order. A second plan to acquire two small cruisers was dropped with the beginning of the Second World War. Soon after the attack on Pearl Harbor, the United States attempted to purchase Almirante Latorre, two destroyers, and a submarine tender, probably because the Chilean Navy had a reputation for keeping its ships in top-quality condition, but the offer was rejected.

During the Second World War, the three major South American navies found themselves unable to acquire major warships; they were able to do so again only after the conflict, when the United States and United Kingdom had many unnecessary or surplus warships. The war had proved the obsolete status of battleships, so the South American navies were seeking cruisers, destroyers, and submarines, yet they ran into political difficulties in acquiring anything larger than Flower-class corvettes and River-class frigates. They were able to acquire them only when the Red Scare began to strongly affect American and international politics. One of the deals reached under the Mutual Defense Assistance Act saw six American light cruisers be evenly split between Argentina, Brazil, and Chile in January 1951. While this bolstered the navies of important South American allies of the United States, which would be treaty-bound to assist the United States in any war, naval historian Robert Scheina argues that the American government also used the opportunity to significantly affect the traditional naval rivalry among the three countries. The warships sold unilaterally changed the naval outlook of all three nations, leading them to accept parity (as opposed to the Argentine pre-war stipulation that its fleet be equal to Brazil's and Chile's combined).

The venerable dreadnoughts of South America soldiered on for a short time after the war. The US Navy's All Hands magazine reported in a series of 1948 articles that all save São Paulo and Almirante Latorre were still in active service; the former had been decommissioned and the latter undergoing repairs. With the influx of the modern cruisers, frigates, and corvettes, however, the battleships were quickly sold for scrap. The Brazilian Navy was the first to dispose of its dreadnoughts, the oldest in the world by that time. São Paulo was sold for scrap in 1951 but sank in a storm north of the Azores while under tow. Minas Geraes followed two years later and was broken up in Genoa beginning in 1954. Of the Argentine dreadnoughts, Moreno was towed to Japan for scrapping in 1957, and Rivadavia was broken up in Italy beginning in 1959. Almirante Latorre, inactive and unrepaired after a 1951 explosion in its engine room, was decommissioned in October 1958 and followed Moreno to Japan in 1959.

== Ships involved ==
Ship	Country	Displacement	Main armament	Builder	Laid down	Launched	Completed	Fate
Minas Geraes	(Brazil)	18,976 long tons (lt); 19,281 tonnes (t)	Twelve 12-inch/45 cal	Armstrong Whitworth	17 April 1907	10 September 1908	January 1910	Scrapped beginning 1954
São Paulo	(Brazil)	18,803 lt/19,105 t	Twelve 12-inch/45 cal	Vickers	30 April 1907	19 April 1909	July 1910	Sank en route to scrapyard, November 1951
Rio de Janeiro	(Brazil) (Ottoman Empire) (United Kingdom)	27,410 lt/27,850 t	Fourteen 12-inch/45	Armstrong	14 September 1911	22 January 1913	August 1914	Acquired by Ottoman Empire, 1913; taken over by the United Kingdom, 1914 as HMS Agincourt; scrapped beginning 1924
Riachuelo	(Brazil)	30,000 lt/30,500 t	Eight 15-inch/45	Armstrong	–	–	–	Canceled after the outbreak of the First World War
Rivadavia	(Argentina)	27,500 lt/27,900 t	Twelve 12-inch/50	Fore River	25 May 1910	26 August 1911	December 1914	Scrapped beginning 1959
Moreno	(Argentina)	27,500 lt/27,900 t	Twelve 12-inch/50	Fore River	9 July 1910	23 September 1911	February 1915	Scrapped beginning 1957
Almirante Latorre	(Chile) (United Kingdom)	28,100 lt/28,600 t	Ten 14-inch/45	Armstrong	27 November 1911	27 November 1913	October 1915	Acquired by the United Kingdom, 1914 as HMS Canada; reacquired by Chile, 1920; scrapped beginning 1959
Almirante Cochrane	(Chile) (United Kingdom)	–	–	Armstrong	20 February 1913	8 June 1918	February 1924	Acquired by the United Kingdom, 1914; converted to aircraft carrier HMS Eagle; sunk 11 August 1942
Key: Brazil Argentina Chile Ottoman Empire United Kingdom
Statistics compiled from: Preston, "Great Britain," 38; Scheina, Naval History, 321–22; Scheina, "Argentina," 401; Scheina, "Brazil," 404; Topliss, "Brazilian Dreadnoughts," 249–51, 281–83, 286.
