= Chilean cruiser O'Higgins (1897) =

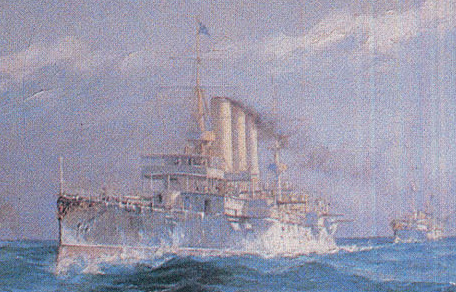
- Cruiser O'Higgins of the Chilean Navy, painting by Álvaro Casanova Zenteno (1857-1935).

History

Chile
- Name: O' Higgins
- Namesake: Bernardo O'Higgins
- Builder: Armstrong Whitworth, Elswick, United Kingdom
- Laid down: 4 April 1896
- Launched: 17 May 1897
- Completed: 2 April 1898
- Fate: Discarded 1946

General characteristics
- Type: Armoured cruiser
- Displacement: 7,796 long tons (7,921 t) standard; 8,500 long tons (8,636 t) full load
- Length: 126 m (412 ft)
- Beam: 19.13 m (62 ft 9 in)
- Draught: 6.93 m (22 ft 9 in)
- Installed power: 16,250 ihp (12,120 kW)
- Propulsion: Two vertical triple expansion steam engines; 30 Belleville boilers; 2 shafts
- Speed: 21.6 kn (40.0 km/h; 24.9 mph)
- Range: 4,580 nmi (8,480 km; 5,270 mi)
- Complement: 500
- Armament: 4 × 8 in (203 mm)/40-calibre guns (4 × 1); 10 × 6 in (152 mm)/40-calibre guns; 4 × 4.7 in (120 mm)/45-calibre guns; 10 × 12-pounder guns; 10 × 6-pounder guns; 2 × machine guns; 3 × 18 in (457 mm) torpedo tubes
- Armour: Harvey Nickel steel; Belt: 7–5 in (178–127 mm); Deck: 3–1.5 in (76–38 mm) slopes; 2–1.5 in (51–38 mm) flats; Main turrets 7–5 in (178–127 mm); Secondary turrets and casemates 6–5 in (152–127 mm); Conning tower 8 in (203 mm)

O'Higgins (Note: Sometimes written as General O'Higgins or erroneously Almirante O'Higgins in the US media., for O'Higgins was never an Almirante.) was a Chilean armoured cruiser. O'Higgins was built by the British shipbuilder Armstrong to the design of Philip Watts, and served with the Chilean Navy between 1898 and 1933.

== Construction ==
In April 1896, the Chilean government ordered an armoured cruiser, to be called O'Higgins, from Armstrong, Whitworth & Co to the design of Sir Philip Watts at a cost of £700,000. The ship was laid down at Armstrong's Elswick, Newcastle-on-Tyne shipyard on 4 April 1896, launched on 17 May 1897 and completed on 2 April 1898.

== Design ==
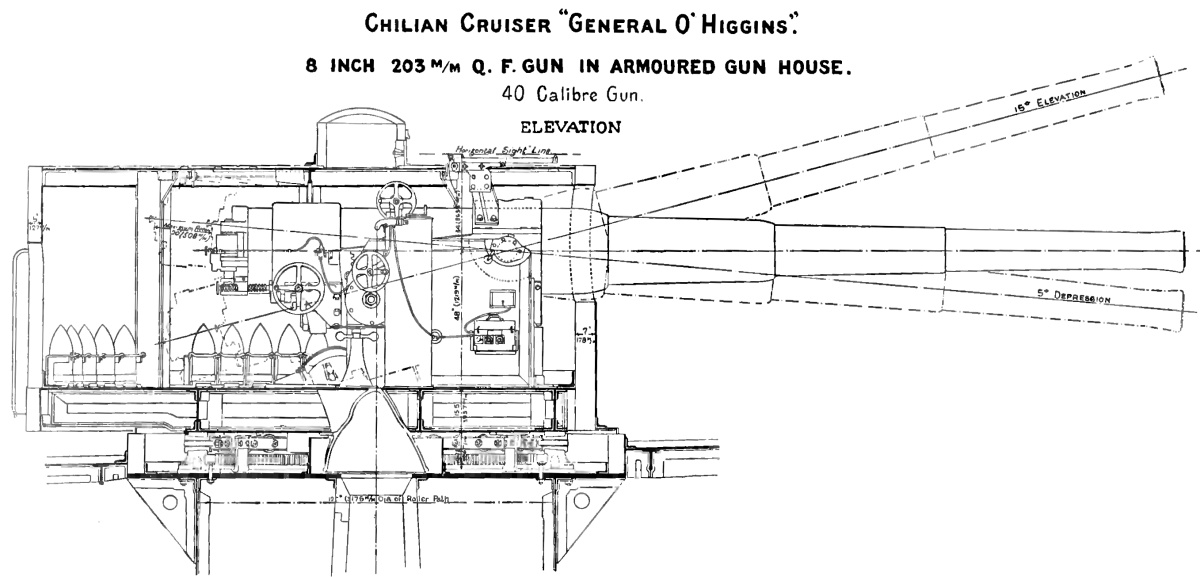

O'Higgins main armament consisted of four 8-inch (203 mm) 40 calibre guns in single turrets, with two on the ship's centreline fore and aft and two port and starboard in line with the forward funnel. Ten 6-inch (152 mm) 40 calibre guns were fitted, with six in casemates and the remaining four in single turrets. Four 4.7-inch (119 mm) guns, ten 12-pounder guns and ten 6-pounder guns completed O'Higgins's gun armament. All guns were designed and built by Armstrongs. Three 18-inch (457 mm) torpedo tubes were fitted, with two submerged tubes on the ship's beam and one above the waterline right aft.

The main protection was a belt of armour along the side of the ship, 260 feet (79 m) long and 7 feet (2.1 m) deep, which was 7 inches (178 mm) thick around the ship's machinery, reducing to 6 inches (152 mm) fore and aft. An armoured deck protected the whole length and beam of the ship, with between 3 inches (76 mm) and 1.5 inches (38 mm) thick armour. The ship's hull was clad in copper and wood to reduce fouling.

The ship was powered by two vertical triple-expansion steam engines, supplied by 30 Belleville water-tube boilers, driving two shafts. These engines generated 16,500 indicated horsepower (12,300 kW) and propelled the ship to 21.6 knots (40.0 km/h; 24.9 mph). Up to 1,253 long tons (1,273 t) of coal could be carried, giving a range of 4,580 nautical miles (8,480 km; 5,270 mi) at 8 knots (15 km/h; 9.2 mph).

== Operational history ==
While O'Higgins was nearing completion at Elswick in the winter of 1897, tensions were growing between Spain and the United States of America over the ongoing rebellion in Cuba. Rumours circulated that Spain was trying to strengthen its navy in case of war with the United States by purchasing warships from other countries. The rumoured targets for Spain included O'Higgins, the newly completed Chilean armoured cruiser Esmeralda and the protected cruiser Ministro Zenteno also nearing completion for Chile at Elswicks. As the outbreak of the Spanish–American War became more likely, the United States also attempted to supplement its fleet by purchasing, amongst other ships, O'Higgins, but the negotiations did not result in the sale of the Chilean warship, and O'Higgins arrived at Valparaíso on 25 July 1898. (Note: The United States did manage to purchase two Armstrong-built protected cruisers from Brazil, which served as USS New Orleans and USS Albany, the former serving in the Spanish–American War.)

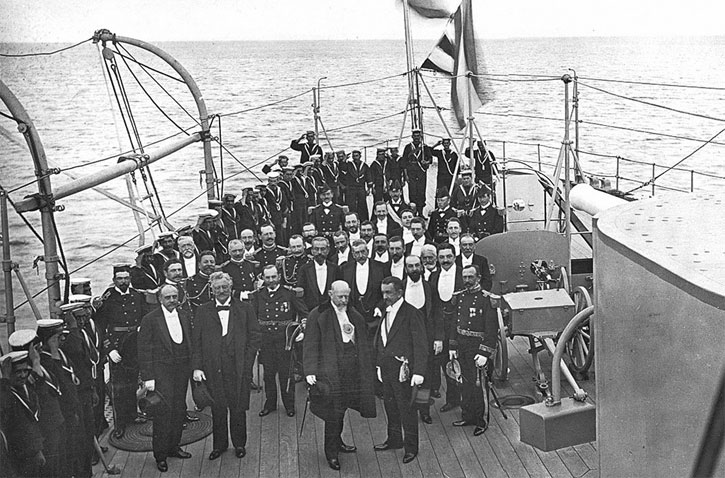
In the foreground, Federico Errázuriz (right) and Julio Roca (left) on the deck of the cruiser O'Higgins

The ship hosted a meeting between the President of Chile, Federico Errázuriz Echaurren and the Argentine President Julio Argentino Roca at Punta Arenas on 15 February 1899, to normalise relations between the two countries. This meeting became known as the "Embrace of the Straits" (El Abrazo del Estrecho). The ship was sent to Panama in 1903 as a result of the confrontation between the United States and Columbia that was ended by the separation of Panama from Colombia.

In 1919, O'Higgins was fitted with a floatplane that could be lowered to and from the sea for operations by crane. On 12 March 1920, O'Higgins collided with the Chilean cargo ship SS Llai Llai at Philadelphia, Pennsylvania; Llai Llai sank. An aircraft crashed into O'Higgins on 24 August 1920, killing the pilot. The ship was refitted twice, in 1919–1920 and 1928–29.

In 1931, O'Higgins was involved in the large scale mutiny that swept the Chilean fleet, being seized by its crew on 1 September 1931.

O'Higgins was decommissioned in 1933 and scrapped in 1958. (Note: Sources differ as to when O'Higgins was disposed of. Chesneau and Kolesnik and Brooke say the ship was discarded in 1946, while Whitley states 1954.)

== See also ==
- List of decommissioned ships of the Chilean Navy

== Notes and references ==
Notes

Citations

Bibliography

- Brooke, Peter. Warships for Export: Armstrong Warships 1867–1927. Gravesend, UK: World Ship Society, 1999. ISBN 0-905617-89-4.
- Chesneau, Roger and Eugene M. Kolesnik. Conway's All the World's Fighting Ships 1860–1905. London: Conway's Maritime Press, 1979. ISBN 0-85177-133-5.
- Whitley, M.J. Cruisers of World War Two: An International Encyclopedia. London: Brockhamton Press, 1999. ISBN 1-86019-8740.
