= Chilean cruiser Esmeralda (1896) =

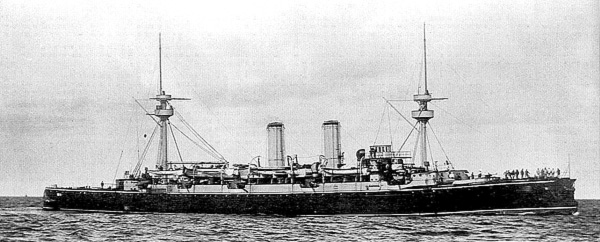
- Esmeralda

History

Chile
- Name: Esmeralda
- Namesake: Esmeralda (1791)
- Ordered: 15 May 1895
- Builder: Armstrong Mitchell, Elswick
- Laid down: 4 July 1895
- Launched: 14 April 1896
- Commissioned: 4 September 1896
- Decommissioned: 1930
- Fate: Scrapped 1930

General characteristics
- Type: Armoured cruiser
- Displacement: 7,032 long tons (7,145 t)
- Length: 436 ft (132.89 m) (pp); 468 ft 3 in (142.72 m) oa
- Beam: 52 ft 5 in (15.98 m)
- Draft: 20 ft 6 in (6.25 m)
- Installed power: 6 cylindrical boilers; 16,000 ihp (12,000 kW)
- Propulsion: 2 shafts; 2 triple expansion steam engines
- Speed: 22.25 knots (41.21 km/h; 25.60 mph)
- Complement: 513
- Armament: 2 × single 8 in (203 mm) guns; 16 × single 6 in (152 mm) guns; 8 × single 12 pdr (3 in (76 mm)) guns; 10 × single 6 pdr (2.2 in (57 mm)) guns; 3 × 18 in (457 mm) torpedo tubes
- Armor: Harvey armor; Belt: 6 in (152 mm); Deck: 1.5–2 in (38–51 mm); Bulkheads: 6 in (152 mm); Gunshields: 4.5 in (114 mm); Conning tower: 8 in (203 mm)

Esmeralda was developed as a custom design by naval architect Philip Watts for the Chilean Navy during the Argentine–Chilean naval arms race.

== Background and design ==
This Esmeralda was purchased in part with US$1,500,000 in funds garnered from the sale of an earlier protected cruiser of the same name to Japan via Ecuador.

The idea for the design was based on the performance of Japanese firepower and speed in the Battle of the Yalu River.

The new ship was defined by historian Adrian J. English as "the first armored cruiser to be built for any navy," and the contemporary Naval Annual called it "one of the most powerful cruisers in the world." Another historian, Peter Brook, has written that Esmeralda should be classified as a lesser "belted" cruiser due to design faults present after its conversion from a protected cruiser while under construction.

== Service ==
On 18 December 1907, the ship brought troops from Valparaíso to Iquique to repress thousands of miners from different nitrate mines in Chile's north who were appealing for government intervention to improve their living and working conditions. This later developed into the Santa María School massacre.

In 1910, it sailed with the cruiser O’Higgins to the naval magazine of Argentina for its centenary.

In 1915, the Chilean Navy claimed that Esmeralda set speed and accuracy world records in big-gun shooting. For the latter, 100 out of 100 shots hit a target.

Esmeralda served in the Chilean Navy until 1930.

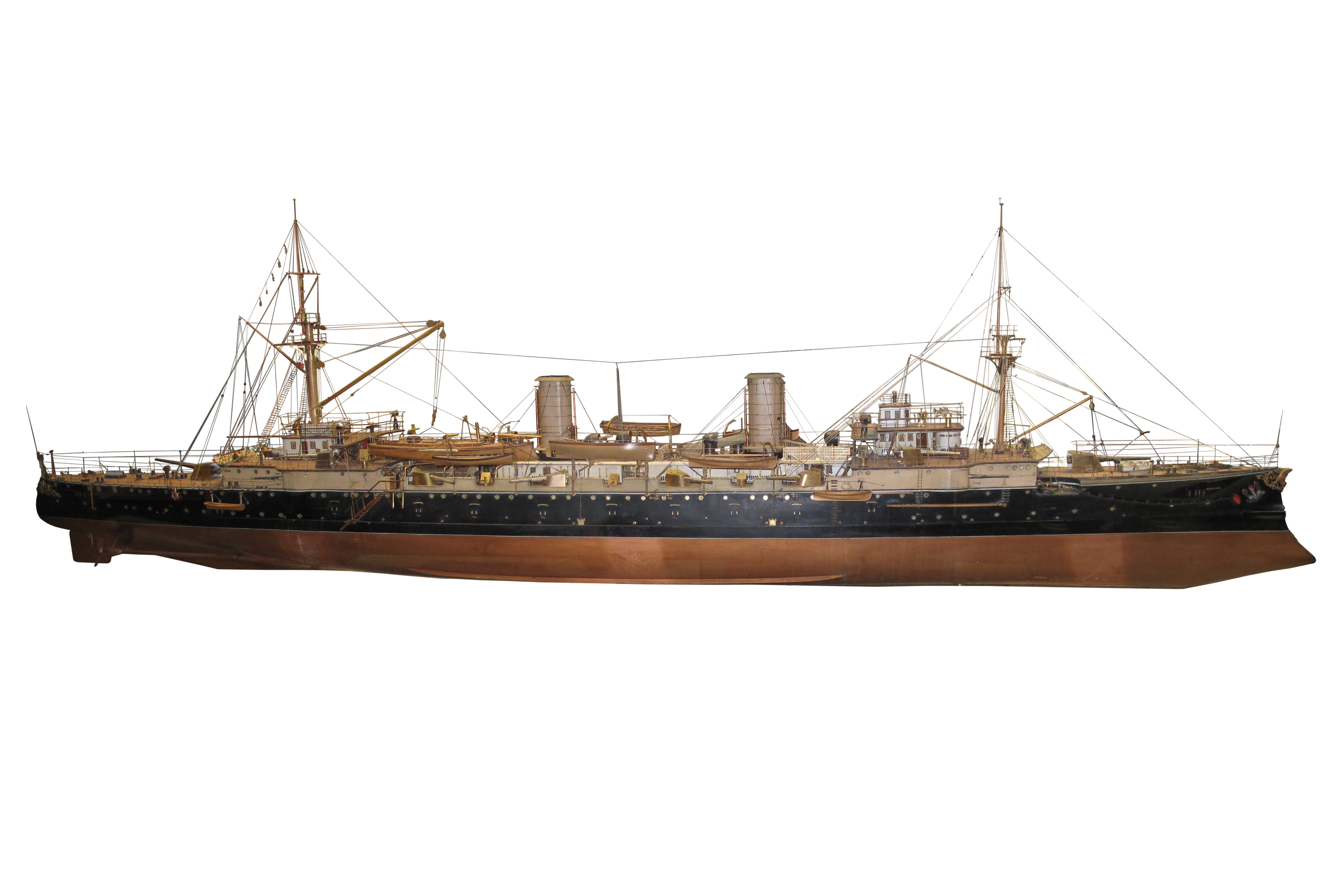
1:48 scale model of Esmeralda, on display at the Swiss Museum of Transport.

== See also ==
- South American dreadnought race
- List of decommissioned ships of the Chilean Navy
