= Philip Watts (naval architect) =

British naval architect (1846–1926)

Sir Philip Watts KCB FRS
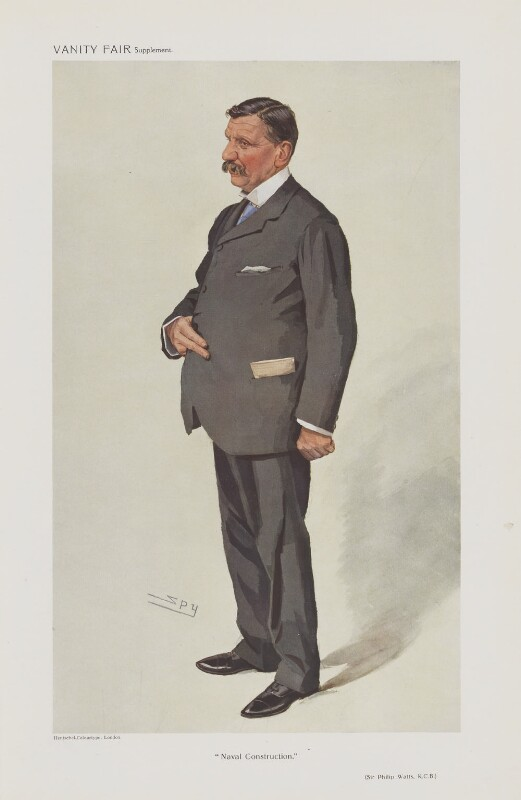
- Philip Watts caricatured by Spy in Vanity Fair, 1910
- Born: 30 May 1846; Deptford, Kent, England
- Died: 15 March 1926 (aged 79); Chelsea, London, England
- Occupation: Naval architect
- Known for: Warship design
- Spouse(s): Elise Isabelle Simonau, daughter of Chevalier Gustave Simonau, of Brussels
- Children: 2 daughters

Sir Philip Watts KCB FRS (30 May 1846 – 15 March 1926) was a British naval architect, famous for designing numerous Elswick cruisers and the revolutionary battleship HMS Dreadnought.

== Early life ==
Watts was born in Deptford, Kent and educated at the Dockyard School in Portsmouth and the Royal School of Naval Architecture in South Kensington, London.

== Career ==
Watts became a constructor to the Admiralty from 1870 to 1885, and reached the rank of chief constructor. From 1885 to 1901 he was director of the war shipping department of Armstrong Whitworth at Elswick (subsequently returning as a director of the company in 1912); but in 1902 he was appointed Director of Naval Construction at the Admiralty. He held this post until 1912, when he was succeeded by Eustace Tennyson d'Eyncourt and became adviser to the Admiralty on naval construction. In this capacity he played an important part when World War I came.

Being the designer of the first dreadnought battleship, it was now up to him to see the use that was made of the fleet which he had brought into being in previous years. In 1912, he was appointed to the Royal Commission on Fuel and Engines.

Watts was a keen volunteer, and a commanding officer of the 1st Northumberland Artillery Volunteers.

In June 1900 he was elected a Fellow of the Royal Society and was vice-president in 1915–1916. He received the honorary degree of Doctor of Laws from the University of Glasgow in early 1903, and was created KCB in 1905.

=== Ships designed ===
Armstrong Whitworth

- NMS Elisabeta, Romanian Navy, 1887
- Castore-class gunboats, Regia Marina, 1887–1889
- Piemonte, Regia Marina, 1887–1889
- Republica, Brazilian Navy, 1892
- ARA Veinticinco de Mayo, Argentine Navy, 1890
- ARA Nueve de Julio, Argentine Navy, 1892
- Japanese cruiser Yoshino, Imperial Japanese Navy, 1892
- Esmeralda, Chilean Navy, 1895
- USS New Orleans (CL-22), United States Navy, 1895
- Almirante Barroso, Brazilian Navy
- Yashima (八島), Imperial Japanese Navy, 1896
- O'Higgins, Chilean Navy, 1897
- Asama (浅間), Imperial Japanese Navy, 1898
- Tokiwa (常盤), Imperial Japanese Navy, 1898
- USS Albany (CL-23), United States Navy, 1898
- Dom Carlos I, Portuguese Navy, 1898
- HNoMS Norge, Royal Norwegian Navy, 1899
- HNoMS Eidsvold, Royal Norwegian Navy, 1899
- Hatsuse (初瀬), Imperial Japanese Navy, 1899
- Izumo (出雲), Imperial Japanese Navy, 1899
- Iwate (磐手), Imperial Japanese Navy, 1900

Royal Navy

- HMS Dreadnought
- Queen Elizabeth-class battleship
- Lord Nelson-class battleships

== Family and later life ==
Watts married Elise Isabelle Simonau, daughter of Belgian draughtsperson and lithographer Gustave Simonau. They had two daughters. He died in 1926 and is buried in Brompton Cemetery.
