= Chilean cruiser Ministro Zenteno =

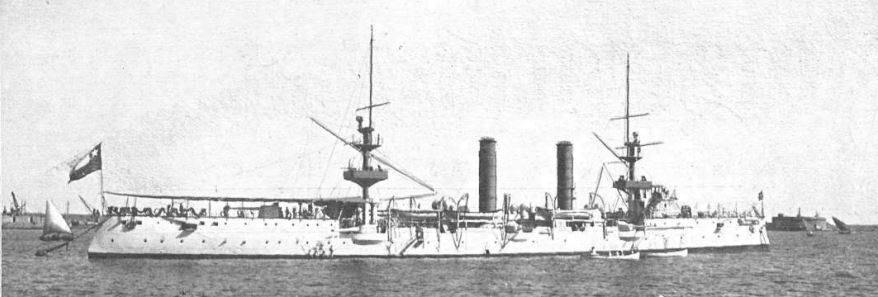

History

Chile
- Name: Ministro Zenteno
- Namesake: José Ignacio Zenteno
- Ordered: Brazil
- Builder: Armstrong, Mitchell and Company
- Cost: £265,000
- Laid down: 6 May 1895
- Launched: 1 February 1896
- Decommissioned: 1930
- Fate: Scrapped

General characteristics
- Class & type: Protected cruiser
- Displacement: 3,437 tons
- Length: 100.6 m (330 ft 1 in) pp
- Beam: 13.3 m (43 ft 8 in)
- Draft: 17 ft (5.2 m)
- Installed power: 7,500
- Propulsion: VTE, 8 cylindrical boilers
- Speed: 20.2 knots (37.4 km/h; 23.2 mph)
- Range: 850 t
- Armament: 8 × 1 – 152/40 Armstrong W; 10 × 1 – 57/40 Hotchkiss; 4 × 1 – 37/23 Hotchkiss; 3 – 450 Torpedo Tubes (1 bow, 2 beam)
- Armor: Deck: 32 mm (1.3 in) with 89 mm (3.5 in) slopes, CT: 102

Ministro Zenteno was a protected cruiser of the Chilean Navy.

== Construction and design ==
In November 1894, the Brazilian government placed an order for three protected cruisers with the British shipyard Armstrong, Mitchell & Company. The first of these ships was laid down on 6 May 1895 at Armstrong's Elswick shipyard, but financial difficulties resulted in the first installment for the ship being delayed, and it was instead sold to the Chilean government in September 1895. At first, the ship was to be named Chacabucu, but was launched with the name Ministro Zenteno on 1 February 1896. Work continued for Brazil on the remaining two ships, with another cruiser ordered to the same design to replace Ministro Zenteno, but only one, Almirante Barroso, was operated by Brazil, with the other two ships, Amazonas (later USS New Orleans) and Almirante Abreu (later USS Albany), purchased by the United States Navy on the eve of the Spanish–American War.

Ministro Zenteno was 108.00 metres (354 ft 4 in) long overall and 100.58 metres (330 ft) between perpendiculars, with a beam of 43 feet 9 inches (13.34 m) and a draught of 5.14 metres (16 ft 10 in). Displacement was 3,473 long tons (3,529 t). Four boilers fed steam to two vertical triple-expansion steam engines rated at a total of 7,500 indicated horsepower (5,600 kW) with forced draught and 6,500 indicated horsepower (4,800 kW) with natural draught, to give a speed of 20.25 knots (23.30 mph; 37.50 km/h) with forced draught.

As a protected cruiser, the ship's vitals were protected by a full-length arched deck of steel armour, 3 1/2 inches (89 mm) thick on the slopes and 1 1/4 inches (32 mm) on the horizontal part of the deck. The ship's conning tower was protected by 4 inches (100 mm) of armour. The ship's main gun armament consisted of eight 6-in (152 mm) 45-calibre quick-firing guns, with two fore-and-aft on the ship's centreline, and three on each beam. The secondary armament was ten 6-pounder (57mm) guns and four 3-pounder (47mm) guns. The ship was fitted with three 18-inch (450mm) torpedo tubes, one fixed in the bow and the other two on swivelling mounts on the ship's broadside.

== Service ==
Ministro Zenteno attended the Pan-American Conference in Mexico in 1901.

In 1907 she sailed off Valparaíso for a training cruise bound for Punta Arenas, Bahía, La Guaira, Bermudas, Hampton Roads, Annapolis, Newport, Plymouth, Brest, Ferrol, Lisbon, Argel, Malta, Spezia, Genoa, Barcelona, Cartagena, Gibraltar, Santa Cruz de Tenerife, Rio de Janeiro, Buenos Aires, Puerto Madryn, Punta Arenas, Puerto Montt, Talcahuano, and back to Valparaíso on 8 December 1907.

== See also ==
- South American dreadnought race
- List of decommissioned ships of the Chilean Navy
