= List of cruisers =

This is a list of cruisers, from 1860 to the present. It includes torpedo, unprotected, protected, scout, light, armoured, battle-, heavy and missile cruisers. Dates are launching dates.

== Africa ==
=== South Africa ===
Protected cruiser

- SATS General Botha (1885, ex-HMS Thames) - Assigned 1922, scuttled 1947.

== Americas ==
=== Argentina ===
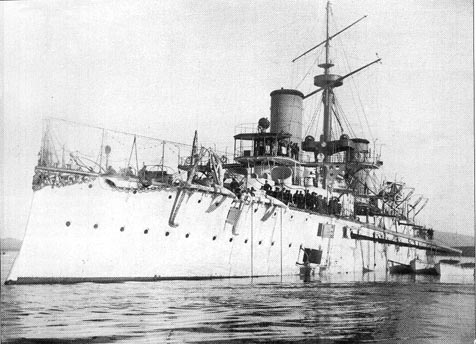
Armored cruiser Garibaldi.

Torpedo cruiser

- Patria (1893) - Decommissioned 1927

Protected cruisers

- Patagonia (1886) - Decommissioned 1927
- Necochea (1890) - Renamed Veinticinco de Mayo, decommissioned 1921
- Nueve de Julio (1892) - Discarded 1930
- Buenos Aires (1895) - Retired 1932

Armored cruisers

- Giuseppe Garibaldi class
  - Garibaldi (1895) - Retired 1934
  - San Martín (1896) - Retired 1935
  - General Belgrano (1897) - Retired 1947
  - Pueyrredón (1897) - Retired 1954
  - Bernardino Rivadavia (1902) - Sold to Japan before delivery 1904, renamed Kasuga, discarded 1945
  - Mariano Moreno (1903) - Sold to Japan before delivery 1904, renamed Nisshin, retired 1935

Heavy cruisers

- Veinticinco de Mayo class
  - Veinticinco de Mayo (1929) - Scrapped 1960
  - Almirante Brown (1929) - Scrapped 1962

Light cruisers

- La Argentina (1937) - Retired 1972
- Brooklyn class
  - Nueve de Julio (1936, ex-USS Boise) - Assigned 1951, retired 1977
  - General Belgrano (1938, ex-USS Phoenix) - Assigned 1951, sunk 1982 in the Falklands War

=== Brazil ===
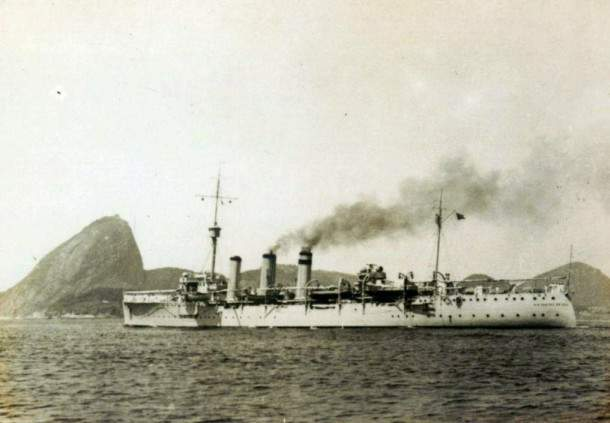
Light cruiser Rio Grande do Sul.

Auxiliary cruisers (former merchant ships)

- Niterói (1893) - Ex El Cid, purchased 1893, sold to United States 1898 and renamed USS Buffalo

Torpedo cruisers

- Tymbira (1896) - ?
- Tamoio (1896) - ?
- Tupi (1896) - Retired 1915

Protected cruisers

- Almirante Tamandaré (1890) - Retired 1915
- Tiradentes (1892) - Decommissioned 1919
- Republica (1892) - Retired 1921
- Almirante Barroso class
  - Name unknown (1896) - Not acquired, purchased by Chile and renamed Ministro Zenteno, decommissioned 1930
  - Almirante Barroso - Retired 1931
  - Amazonas (1896) - Not acquired, purchased by United States and renamed USS New Orleans, decommissioned 1922
  - Almirante Abreu (1899) - Not acquired, purchased by United States and renamed USS Albany, decommissioned 1922

Scout cruisers

- Bahia class
  - Bahia (1909) - Lost 1945
  - Rio Grande do Sul (1910) - BU 1948

Light cruisers

- Brooklyn class
  - Almirante Barroso (1936, ex-USS Philadelphia) - Assigned 1951, retired 1973
- St. Louis class
  - Almirante Tamandaré (1938, ex-USS St. Louis) - Assigned 1951, retired 1976

=== Canada ===
Protected cruiser

- British Apollo class
  - Rainbow (1891, ex-British Rainbow, transferred 1910) – Sold 1920
- British Diadem class
  - Niobe (1897, ex-British Niobe, transferred 1910) – BU 1922

Light cruisers

- British Arethusa class
  - Aurora (1913, ex-British Aurora, transferred 1920) – Sold for scrap 1927
- British Fiji class
  - Uganda (1941, ex-British Uganda, transferred 1944) – Renamed Quebec 1952, BU 1961
- British Minotaur class
  - Ontario (1943, ex-British Minotaur, transferred 1944) – BU 1960

=== Chile ===
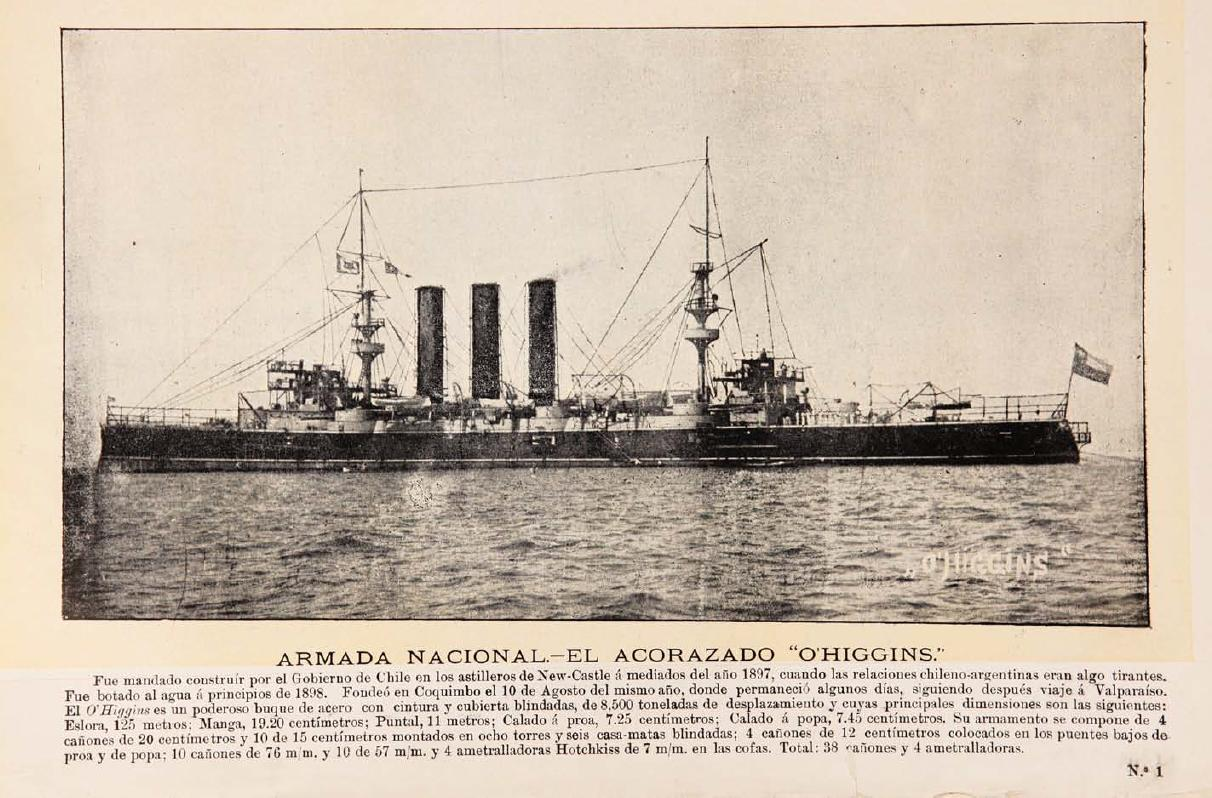
Armored cruiser O'Higgins.

Unprotected cruiser

- Arturo Prat (1880) - Purchase canceled and sold to Japan in 1883, renamed Tsukushi, retired 1910

Protected cruisers

- Esmeralda (1883) - Sold to Japan 1894, renamed Izumi, discarded 1912
- Presidente Errázuriz class
  - Presidente Errázuriz (1890) - Discarded 1930
  - Presidente Pinto (1890) - Shipwreck 1905
- Blanco Encalada (1893) - Retired 1940
- Ministro Zenteno (1896) - Retired 1930
- Chacabuco (1897) - Stricken 1959

Armored cruisers

- Esmeralda (1895) - Retired 1930
- O'Higgins (1896) - Retired 1933

Light cruisers

- Brooklyn class
  - O'Higgins (1936, ex-USS Brooklyn) - Acquired 1951, retired 1991
  - Capitán Prat (1937, ex-USS Nashville) - Acquired 1951, retired 1982
- Tre Kronor class
  - Almirante Latorre (1945, ex-Swedish Göta Lejon) - Commissioned 1971, retired 1984

=== Ecuador ===
Abdón Calderón as a museum ship.

Auxiliary cruiser (former merchant ship)

- BAE Abdón Calderón (1884, ex-Chilean Chaihuín), purchased 1886 and renamed Cotopaxi, renamed Abdón Calderón 1936, retired 1960, museum ship as of 1986.

=== Haiti ===
Protected cruiser

- Consul Gostrück (1894, ex-Italian Umbria), assigned 1910, lost 1911.

=== Peru ===
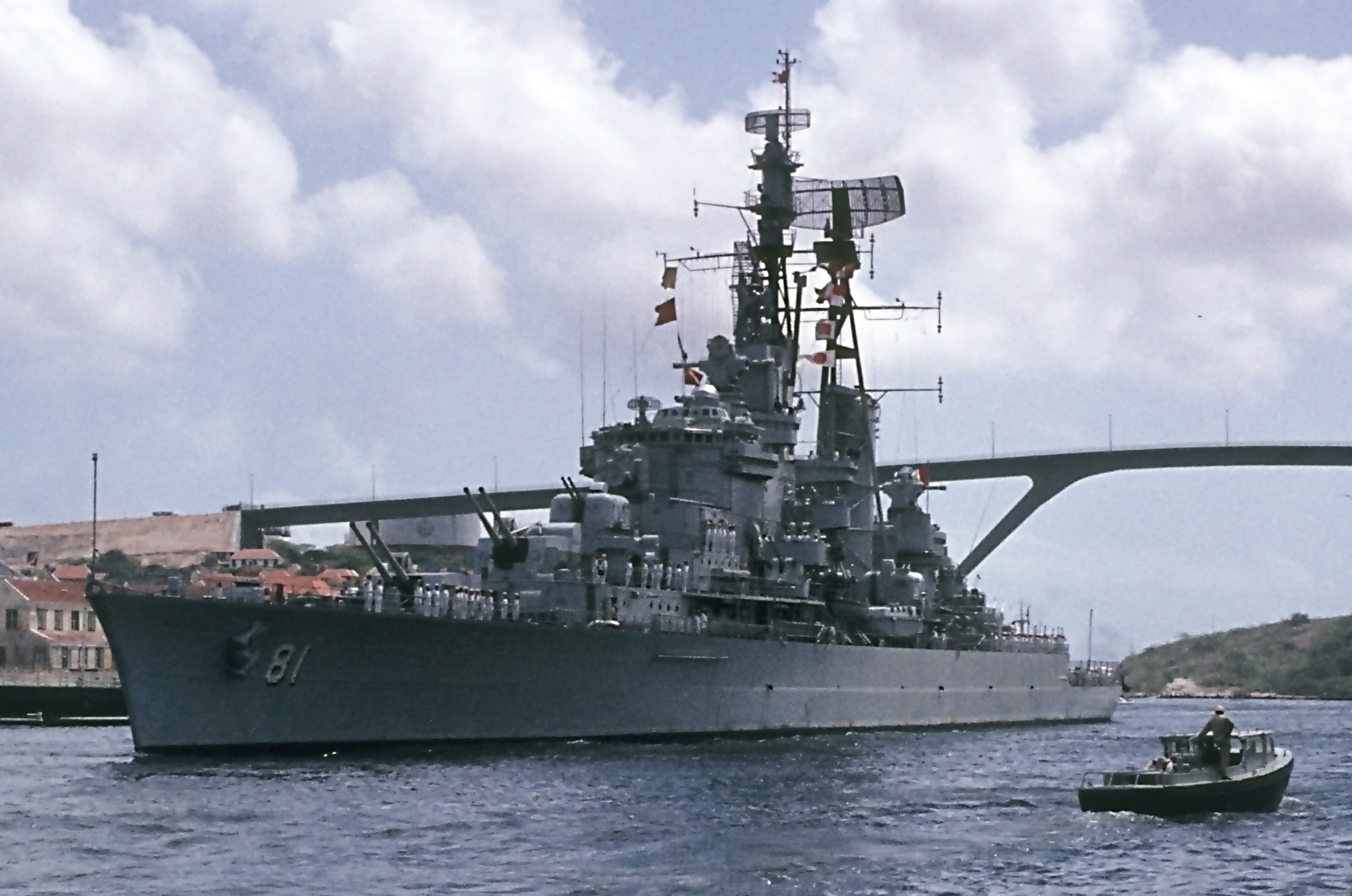
Light cruiser Almirante Grau (1973).

Auxiliary cruisers

- Sócrates class (ex-Portuguese)
  - Sócrates (1880) - Renamed Lima, assigned 1889, retired 1950
  - Diógenes (1881) - Renamed Callao, not delivered, purchased by the United States in 1898 and renamed USS Topeka

Scout cruisers

- Almirante Grau class
  - Almirante Grau (1906) - retired 1958
  - Coronel Bolognesi (1906) - retired 1958

Armored cruiser

- Comandante Aguirre (ex-French Dupuy de Lôme) (1890) - purchased 1912, purchase canceled 1914

Light cruisers

- Fiji class
  - Capitán Quiñones (1941, ex-British HMS Newfoundland) - assigned 1959, retired 1979. Called Almirante Grau 1960-1973
  - Coronel Bolognesi (1942, ex-British HMS Ceylon) - assigned 1960, retired 1982
- De Zeven Provinciën class
  - Almirante Grau (1944, ex-Dutch HNLMS De Ruyter) - assigned 1973, retired 2017
  - Aguirre (1950, ex-Dutch HNLMS De Zeven Provinciën) - assigned 1978, retired 1999

=== Uruguay ===
Protected cruiser

- Montevideo (1885, ex-Italian Dogali) - purchased 1908, decommissioned 1932

=== Venezuela ===
Protected cruiser

- Mariscal Sucre (ex-Spanish Isla de Cuba) (1886) - purchased 1912, decommissioned 1940

== Asia ==
=== China ===
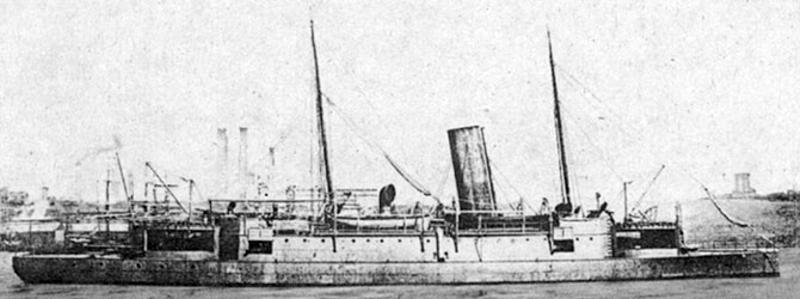
Chaoyong docked at Weihaiwei

Unprotected Cruisers

- Chaoyong class
  - Chaoyong (1880) - Sunk 1894
  - Yangwei (1881) - Sunk 1894
- Kai Che (1882) - Explosion 1902
- Nan Thin class
  - Nan Thin (1883)
  - Nan Shuin (1884)
- Pao Min (1885)
- King Ch'ing class
  - King Ch'ing (1886)
  - Huan T'ai (1886) - Collision 1902
- Tung Chi (1894) - Sunk 1937
- Fu An (1897)

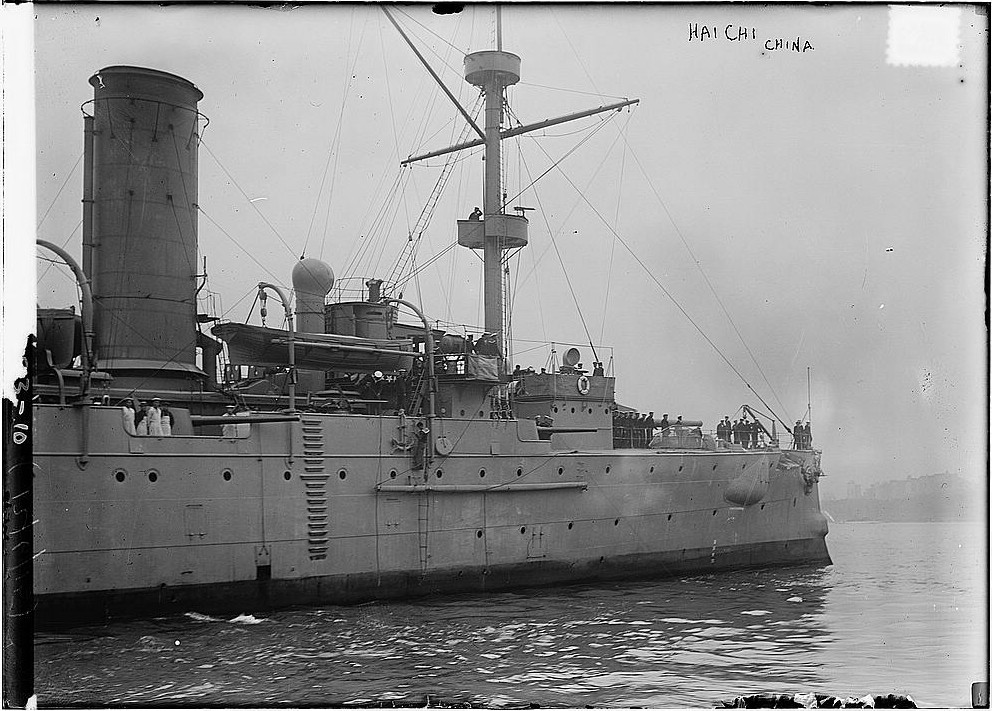
Hai Chi on 11 September 1911 in New York City

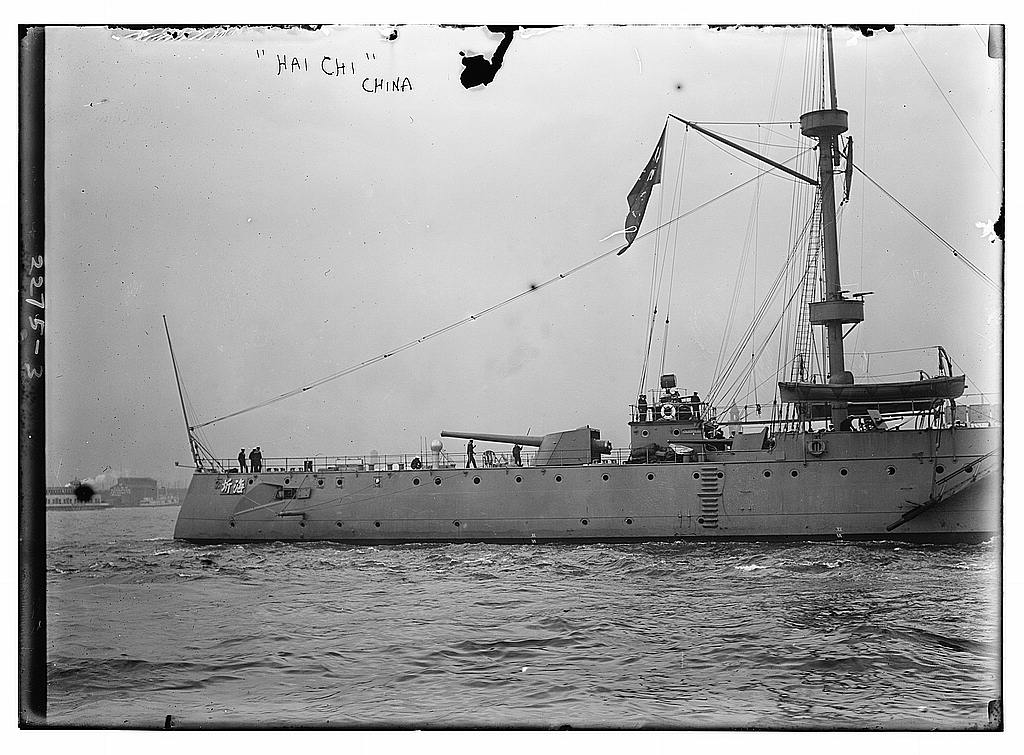
Hai Chi on 11 September 1911 in New York City

Protected Cruisers

- Jiyuan (1883) - Captured by Japan 1895, renamed Sai Yen, mined 1904
- Zhiyuan class cruiser, 2,680 ton, Armstrong
  - Chih Yuen (1886) - Sunk 1894
  - Ching Yuen (1886) - Sunk 1895
- Hai Chi class cruiser, 4,300 ton, Armstrong
  - Hai Tien (1897) - Sunk 1904
  - Hai Chi (1898) - Sunk 1937 as blockship in Yangtze river
- Hai Yung class cruiser, 2,680 ton, AG Vulcan
  - Hai Yung (1897) - Sunk 1937 as blockship in Yangtze river
  - Hai Chou (1897) - Sunk 1937 as blockship in Yangtze river
  - Hai Shen (1898) "Pearl of the Sea" - Sunk 1937 as blockship in Yangtze river
- Chao Ho class
  - Chao Ho (1912) - Sunk 1937.
  - Ying Rui (1913) - Sunk 1937.

Armoured Cruisers

- King Yuan class
  - King Yuen (1887) - Sunk 1894
  - Laiyuan (1887) - Sunk 1895
- Lung Wei (1888) - Renamed Ping Yuen

Light cruisers

- Ning Hai class
  - Ning Hai (1931) - Sunk 1937. Re-floated by Japan and renamed Ioshima. Sunk by USS Shad.
  - Ping Hai (1931) - Sunk 1937. Re-floated by Japan and renamed Yasoshima. Sunk by US aircraft attack.
- Yat Sen (1934) - Sunk 1937. Re-floated by Japan and renamed Atada. Returned to the Republic of China 1946, decommissioned 1958
- British Arethusa class
  - Chung King (1948) - ex-HMS Aurora of the Royal Navy, sold on 19 May 1948 to the Nationalist Chinese Navy. Defected to Chinese Communists and then sunk by Nationalist aircraft in 1949, continued in service as an accommodations and warehouse hulk until mid-1950s.

Guided missile cruisers

- Type 055 class

=== India ===
- British Leander class
  - Delhi (1932, ex-British HMNZS Achilles, purchased 1948) – Scrapped 1978
- British Crown Colony class
  - Mysore (1939, ex-British HMS Nigeria, purchased 1957) – Scrapped 1985

=== Indonesia ===
- KRI Irian (purchased 1962), former Soviet Sverdlov-class cruiser Ordzhonikidze – Scrapped 1972

=== Pakistan ===
- Babur (purchased 1956), the former British Dido-class cruiser HMS Diadem, renamed Jahangir, c. 1961

=== Thailand/Siam ===
- Taksin class (1939, requisitioned by Italy 1941)
  - Taksin (unfinished)
  - Naresuan (unfinished)

=== Turkey/Ottoman Empire ===
Battlecruisers

- Yavuz Sultan Selim (ex-German Goeben) (1912) -purchased 1914, BU 1974

Unprotected cruisers

- Lütf-ü Hümayun (1892) - BU 1911
- Heibetnuma (1892) - BU 1911
- Feyzâ-i Bahri class
  - Feyzâ-i Bahri (unfinished)
  - Şadiye (unfinished)
- Hüdâvendigâr class
  - Hüdâvendigâr (unfinished)
  - Selimiye (unfinished)

Protected cruisers

- Hamidiye (Abdul Hamid) (1903) - BU 1947
- Mecidiye (1903) - captured by Russian 1915, restored 1918, BU 1948

Light cruisers

- Midilli (ex-German Breslau ) (1912) - purchased 1914, mined 1918

Torpedo cruisers

- Peyk-i Şevket class
  - Peyk-i Şevket (1906)
  - Berk-i Satvet (1906)

== Europe ==
=== Belgium ===
Protected cruiser

- D'Entrecasteaux

=== Croatia ===
Light cruiser

- Zniam (ex-KB Dalmacija, ex-SMS Niobe)

=== Denmark ===
Unprotected cruiser

- Fyen (1882)

Protected cruisers

- Valkyrien (1888)
- Hekla (1890)
- Gejser class
  - Gejser (1892)
  - Heimdal (1894)

=== Germany ===
- List of battlecruisers of Germany
- List of cruisers of Germany

=== Greece ===
Navarchos Miaoulis

- Amalia (1861) - Renamed Hellas 1862, BU 1906
- Navarchos Miaoulis (1879) - Sold 1931
- Antinavarchos Kountouriotis (1914) - Purchased by Royal Navy while under construction
- Lambros Katsonis (1914) - Purchased by Royal Navy while under construction
- Elli (1912, purchased 1914) - Torpedoed by Italian submarine 1940
- Giorgios Averof (1910) - Italian Pisa class, preserved at Faliro as museum
- Elli II (1935, ex-Italian Eugenio di Savoia, obtained in 1951 as war reparations) - Stricken 1964

=== Norway ===
Protected cruisers

- Viking (1891)
- Frithjof (1896)

=== Poland ===
Light cruisers

- Danae-class
  - Dragon
  - Conrad

Protected cruisers

- ORP Bałtyk

=== Portugal ===
- Adamastor (1896) - Sold 1933
- São Gabriel class
  - NRP São Gabriel (1898) - Disposed of 1924
  - NRP São Rafael (1898) - Wrecked 1923
- Dom Carlos I (1898) - Renamed Candido Reis 1910, disposed of 1923
- Rainha Dona Amélia (1899) - Renamed República 1910, wrecked 1915
- Carvalho Araújo class - sloops re-rated as cruisers
  - Carvalho Araújo (1921) - Disposed of 1959
  - República II (1921) - Disposed of 1943

=== Sweden ===
Armoured cruiser

- Fylgia (1905) - Sold for BU 1957

Seaplane cruiser

- Gotland (1933) - converted to an anti-aircraft cruiser - BU 1963

Light cruisers

- Tre Kronor class converted to anti-aircraft cruisers
  - Tre Kronor (1944)
  - Göta Lejon (1945)

Mine cruiser

- Älvsnabben (1943)
- Clas Fleming

Torpedo cruisers

- Claes Horn
- Claes Uggla
- Jacob Bagge
- Psilander
- Örnen

=== Ukraine ===
- Ukraina

=== United Kingdom ===
- List of battlecruisers of the Royal Navy
- List of cruisers of the Royal Navy

=== Yugoslavia ===
- Dalmacija (the former German SMS Niobe)

== Oceania ==
=== Australia ===
Protected cruiser

- Encounter (1902) - Scuttled 1932

Battlecruiser

- Australia (1911) - Scuttled 1924

Light cruisers

- British Chatham class
  - Sydney (1912) - BU 1929
  - Melbourne (1912) - BU 1929
  - Brisbane (1915) - Sold for BU 1936
  - Adelaide (1918) - BU 1949
- British Leander (Apollo) class
  - Perth (1934) - Sunk 1942
  - Sydney (1934) - Sunk 1941
  - Hobart (1934) - BU 1962

Heavy cruisers

- British County class
  - Australia (1927) - BU 1955
  - Canberra (1927) - Sunk 1942
  - Shropshire (1927) - BU 1955

=== New Zealand ===
- HMNZS Achilles - Formerly British Achilles
- HMNZS Leander - Formerly British Leander
- HMNZS Gambia - Formerly British Gambia
- HMNZS Black Prince - Formerly British Black Prince
- HMNZS Bellona - Formerly British Bellona
- HMNZS Royalist - Formerly British Royalist

== See also ==
- List of ironclads
- List of battleships
- List of ships of the Second World War
- List of cruisers of the Second World War
