= Portuguese cruiser Rainha Dona Amélia =

Portuguese protected cruiser

Coordinates: 39.33°N 9.36°W

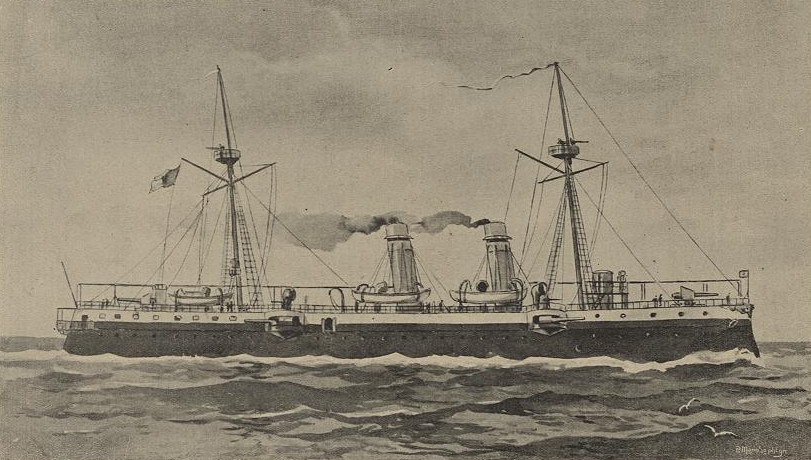
- Rainha Dona Amélia in a drawing from 1901

History

Portugal
- Name: Rainha Dona Amélia
- Builder: Arsenal da Marinha, Lisbon
- Launched: 10 April 1899
- Commissioned: 23 May 1901
- Recommissioned: December 1910
- Decommissioned: 3 August 1915
- Renamed: República
- Fate: abandoned on a sandbank

General characteristics
- Class & type: Protected cruiser
- Displacement: 1,630 t (1,600 long tons)
- Length: 75 m (246 ft 1 in)
- Beam: 11.8 m (38 ft 9 in)
- Draught: 4.45 m (14 ft 7 in)
- Propulsion: Twin-shaft engine, 5,000 hp (3,700 kW)
- Speed: 20 kn (37 km/h; 23 mph)
- Range: 4,200 nmi (7,800 km; 4,800 mi)
- Endurance: 322 tons of coal
- Complement: 273
- Armament: 4 × Canet 150 mm guns; 2 × 100 mm guns; 2 × 47 mm guns; 2 × 37 mm guns; 2 × 356 mm torpedo tubes
- Armour: Deck: 30–37 mm (1.2–1.5 in); Conning tower: 51 mm (2.0 in)

Rainha Dona Amélia, later NRP República, was a Portuguese protected cruiser, the first steel warship constructed in Portugal. Launched on 10 April 1899, it served in the Portuguese Navy, performing both ceremonial and combat roles. Designed to carry a landing force, it was recommended for colonial service. Following the overthrow of the Portuguese monarchy in 1910, the ship was renamed República. It was lost after running aground on 3 August 1915.

== History ==
=== Background ===
The expansion of the Portuguese Navy was initiated by a decree from King Carlos I on 20 March 1890. The plan called for the construction of four coastal defence ships and ten cruisers, some intended for service in the Portuguese colonies. However, the country's bankruptcy in 1892 halted these ambitions. A public fundraising campaign, spanning eight years, eventually led to the commissioning of the cruiser NRP Adamastor from an Italian shipyard. The original plan was revived by Navy Minister Jacinto Cândido da Silva, who, due to financial constraints, scaled it down to focus on cruisers. Those designated for colonial service were to share characteristics with Adamastor. A design competition resulted in the construction of two protected cruisers of the São Gabriel class in France. The contract stipulated that France would provide Portugal with full technical documentation, enabling future cruisers to be built at the Arsenal da Marinha in Lisbon.

=== Construction ===
To adapt the design to Portuguese conditions, French engineer Alphonse Croneau was brought in. The initial design envisioned a cruiser with a displacement of 1,300 metric tons (1,300 long tons) and a maximum speed of 16 knots (30 km/h; 18 mph), though these parameters were later revised. Financial difficulties limited the planned construction of four cruisers to just one. The ship was launched on 10 April 1899 and named Rainha Dona Amélia in honor of Queen Amélie of Orléans. This naming aligned with the convention of the larger cruiser Dom Carlos I, built in Britain. Rainha Dona Amélia was the first steel warship constructed in a Portuguese shipyard and the last cruiser completed by Portugal.

== Design ==
=== Hull ===
Rainha Dona Amélia had a displacement of 1,630 tonnes (1,600 long tons), exceeding the original design by over 300 t (300 long tons). Her length between perpendiculars was 75 metres (246 ft 1 in), with a beam of 11.8 m (38 ft 9 in) and a maximum draught of 4.45 m (14 ft 7 in). The deck armor ranged from 30 to 37 millimetres (1.2 to 1.5 in), while the conning tower was protected by 51 mm (2.0 in) of armour.

=== Propulsion ===
The cruiser was powered by a twin-shaft steam engine producing 5,000 horsepower (3,700 kW), achieving a maximum speed of 20 knots (37 km/h; 23 mph). With a coal capacity of 322 t (317 long tons; 355 short tons), it could travel approximately 4,200 nautical miles (7,800 km; 4,800 mi) at economical speed.

=== Armament ===
The main armament consisted of four 150 mm L/45 Canet guns. These were complemented by two Canon de 100 mm Modèle 1891 guns, two 47 mm guns, and two 37 mm guns. The ship also carried two 356 mm torpedo tubes. The 100 mm guns were positioned on deck at the bow and stern, while the 150 mm guns were mounted on sponsons along the sides.

== Service ==
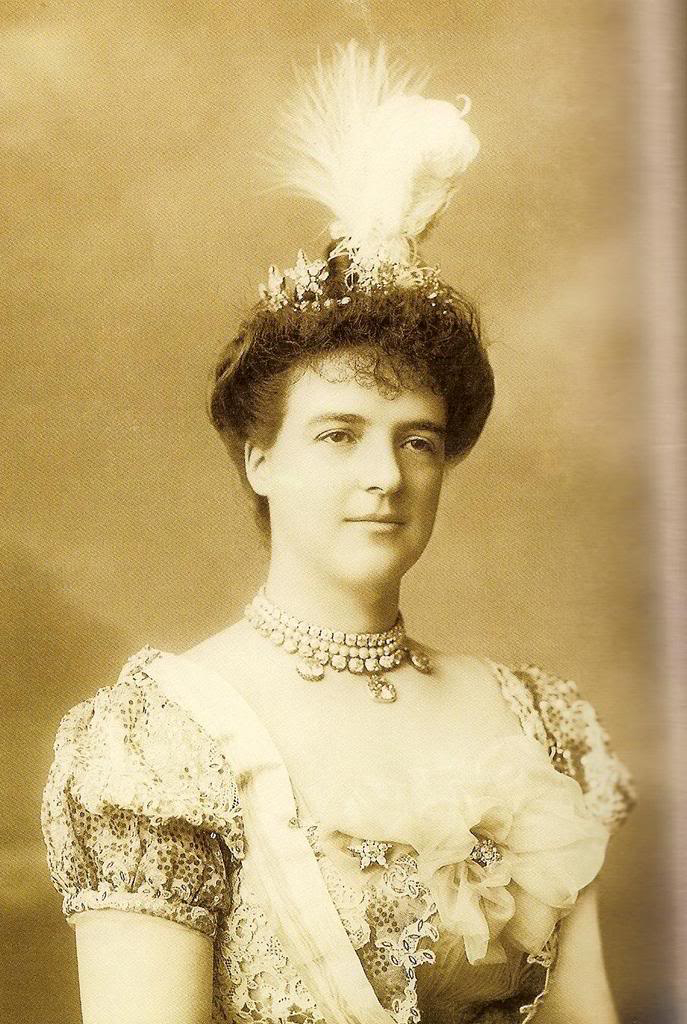
Queen Amélie of Orléans, after whom the cruiser was initially named

=== Monarchy period ===
Rainha Dona Amélia was commissioned into the Portuguese Navy on 23 May 1901. The cruiser served both ceremonial and combat roles. In June 1901, it accompanied Dom Carlos I and São Gabriel during a royal visit to Madeira and the Azores. In 1902, alongside Dom Carlos I, it participated in a naval review at Spithead for the coronation of Edward VII, transporting Prince Luís Filipe.

Her first combat mission was assisting in suppressing a strike in Douro in 1903. In 1904, it contributed to efforts to curb the slave trade in Portuguese Angola. Operations in the Cuamato region were conducted alongside São Gabriel. Due to the need for repairs, the cruiser was withdrawn from active service in 1905.

=== Republic period ===
During the 5 October 1910 revolution, Rainha Dona Amélia was en route to Asia. Following the revolution, her name was deemed incompatible with the new regime, and in December 1910, it was renamed República. The republicans decided that, due to unrest in the metropole, all cruisers were needed in Europe. That year, the ship was adapted to carry cadets.

Prior to Portugal entering World War I on the side of the Allies in 1916, its warships, including República, enforced neutrality as part of a coastal defense training squadron. At 07:00 AM on 3 August 1915, while on patrol, the cruiser ran aground near Consolação beach, south of Peniche. The tug Bérrio and the rescue vessel Walkirian arrived six hours later, but attempts to refloat República failed due to an approaching storm, and the rescue operation was abandoned. The ship was struck from the navy list on 20 August 1915. In mid-October, a naval board determined that the ship's commander was not responsible for the incident.

== Bibliography ==
- Anca, Alejandro A.; Mitiuckow, Nikołaj W. (2011). "Krążowniki Portugalii" [Portuguese Cruisers]. Okręty Wojenne (in Polish). 5 (109). Tarnowskie Góry: Wydawnictwo Okręty Wojenne. ISSN 1231-014X.
