= ARA La Argentina (C-3) =

1937 training cruiser

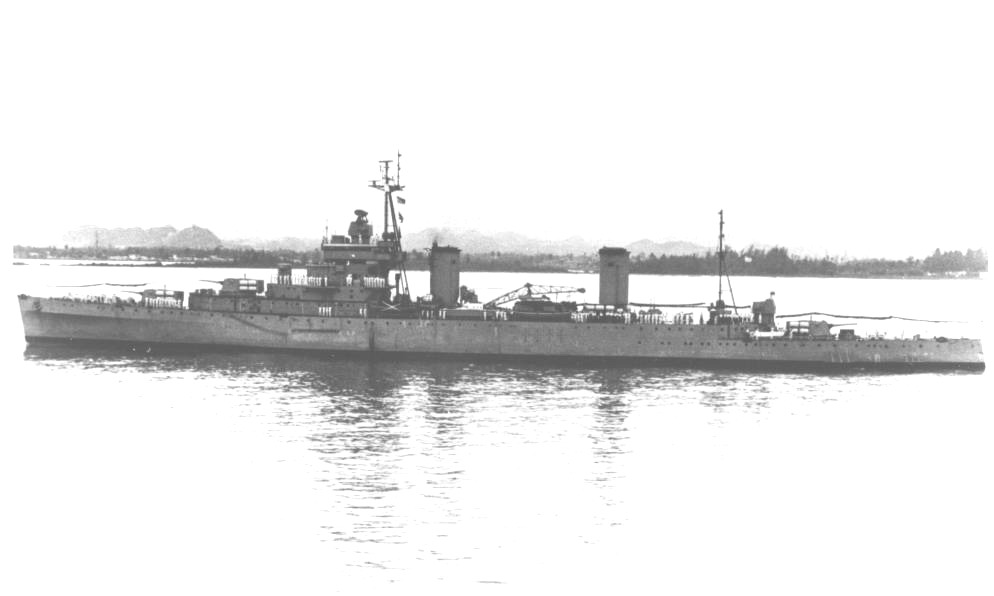
- ARA La Argentina

History

Argentina
- Name: La Argentina
- Builder: Vickers-Armstrongs, Barrow in Furness
- Laid down: 11 January 1936
- Launched: 16 March 1937
- Completed: 31 January 1939
- Acquired: February 1939
- Commissioned: 12 April 1939
- Decommissioned: 1972
- Fate: Scrapped 1974

General characteristics
- Type: Light cruiser
- Displacement: 6,500 tons (standard); 7,500 tons (full load)
- Length: 165 m (541 ft 4 in)
- Beam: 17.22 m (56 ft 6 in)
- Draught: 5.03 m (16 ft 6 in)
- Propulsion: 4 shaft Parsons geared turbines, 4 Yarrow type boilers, 54,000 hp (40,000 kW)
- Speed: 30 knots (56 km/h)
- Range: 12,000 nautical miles (22,000 km) at 12 knots (22 km/h)
- Complement: 800 (including 60 cadets)
- Armament: 9 × 6 inch (152 mm) guns (3 × 3); 4 × 4 inch (100 mm) guns (4 × 1); 8 × 2-pounder "pom pom" (8 × 1); 6 × 21 inch torpedo tubes (2 × 3)
- Armour: 3 inch belt; 2 inch deck; 2 inch turrets; 3 inch conning tower
- Aircraft carried: 1 × Supermarine Walrus
- Aviation facilities: Catapult launcher

ARA La Argentina was a light cruiser, designed for training naval cadets, built for the Argentine Navy. The ship was authorised in 1934, and the contract was put out to tender in 1935, being won by the British company Vickers-Armstrongs at a cost of 6 million pesos.

La Argentina was built in Barrow-in-Furness, England. She was laid down on 11 January 1936, launched 16 March 1937 and not completed until 31 January 1939, being delayed by the British re-armament programme. She was decommissioned in 1972 and scrapped.

== Design ==
The design was based on British practice, being modified to meet the requirements of the Argentinians for a training ship with 60 cadets. This ship was an enlarged version of the Arethusa class, armed with triple turrets.

== Service ==
The ship sailed from Britain in February 1939 and arrived at La Plata on 2 March, being commissioned on 12 April 1939. She made several training cruises before the war but was placed in the active squadron to maintain Argentine neutrality. After the war she made many training cruises before retiring in 1972.

== Gallery ==
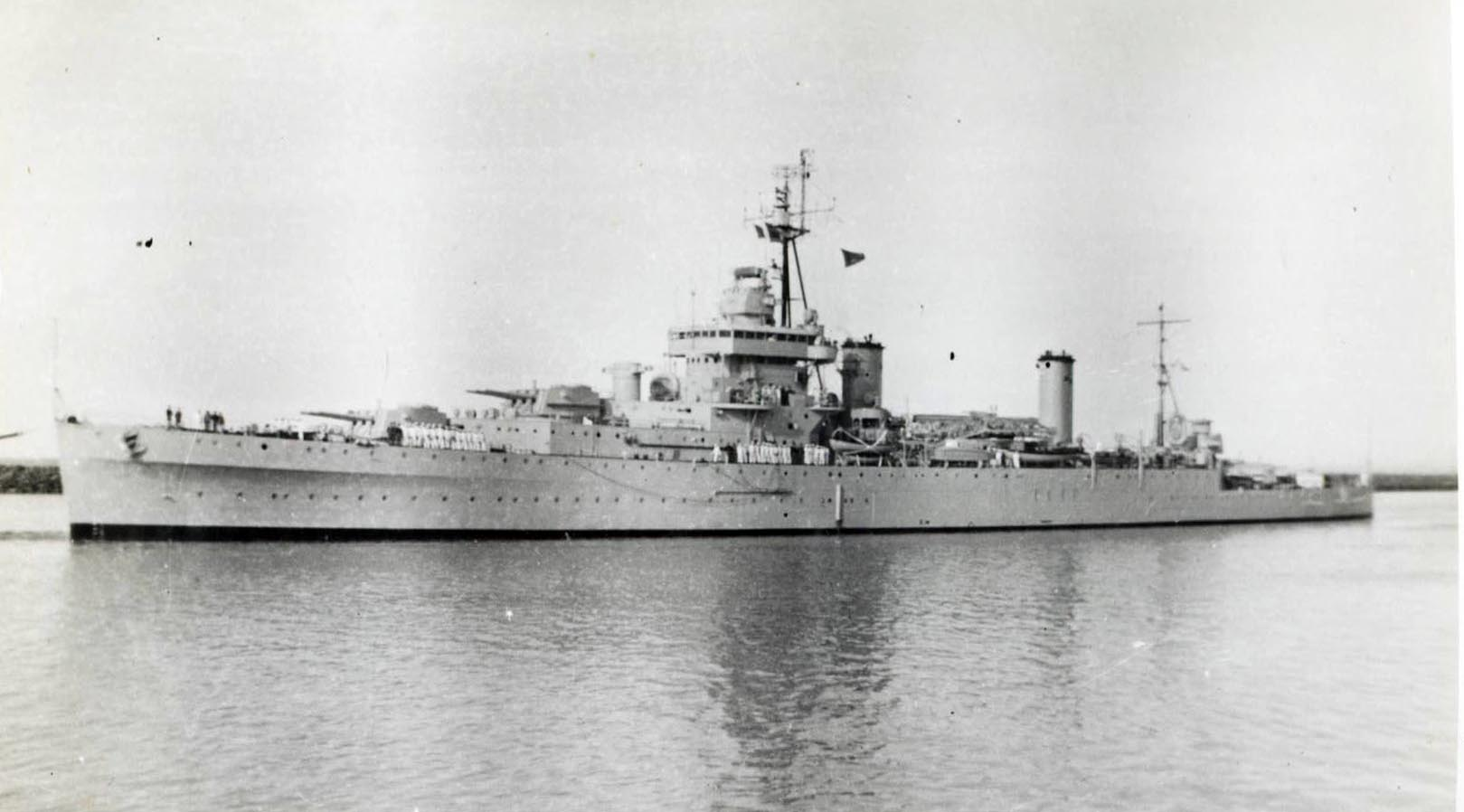
Front side view, note triple 6in gun turrets

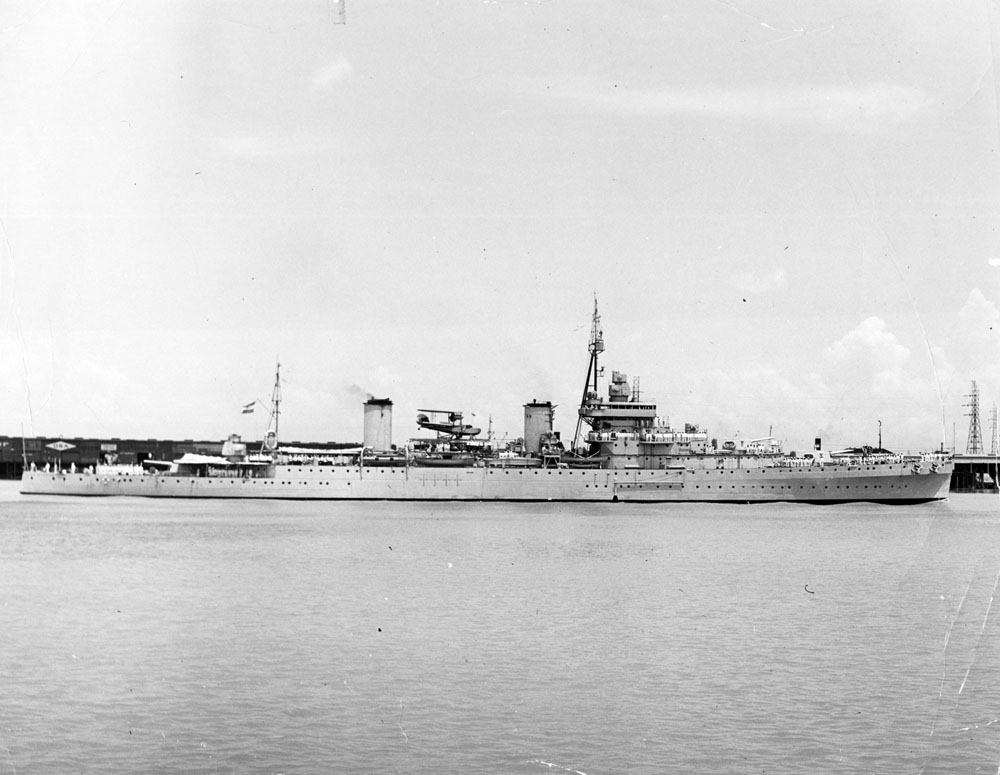
Side view, note Walrus plane amidships

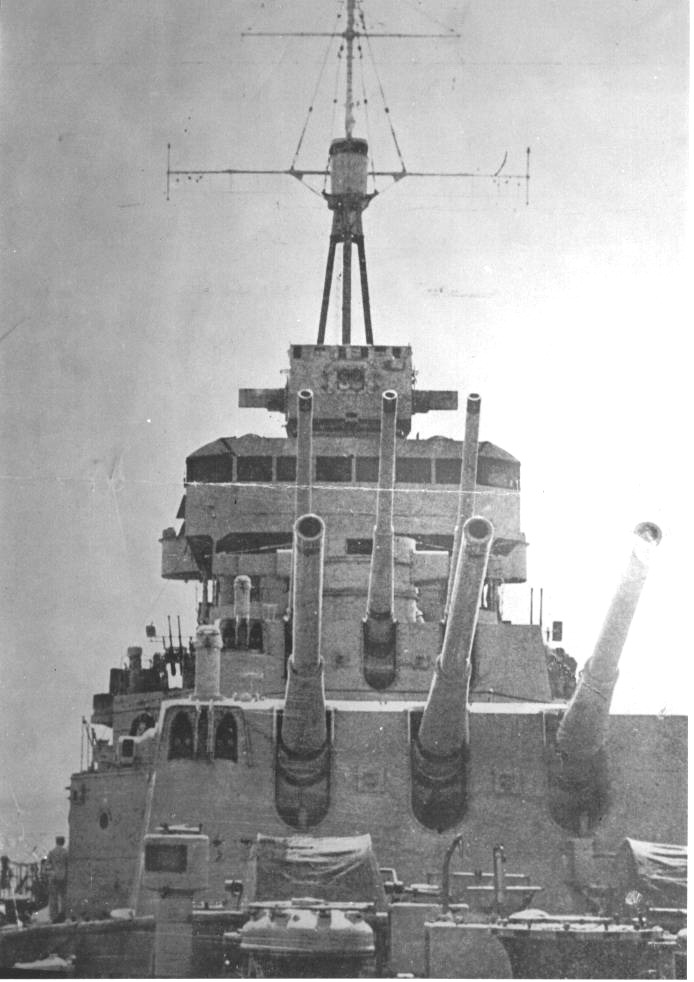
Front view, close-up main gun turrets

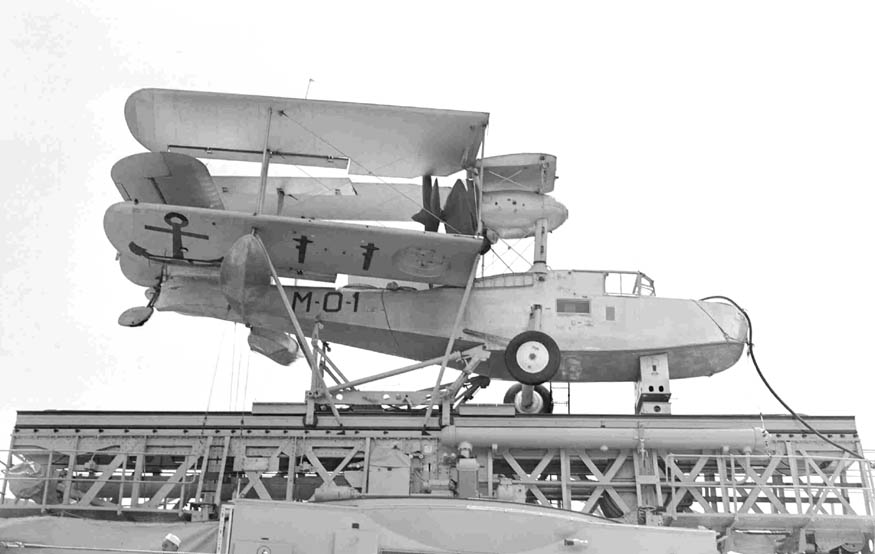
Walrus MK-IV on board La Argentina, San Francisco, 1940

== See also ==
- List of cruisers
- List of ships of the Argentine Navy
