= ARA Patagonia (1886) =

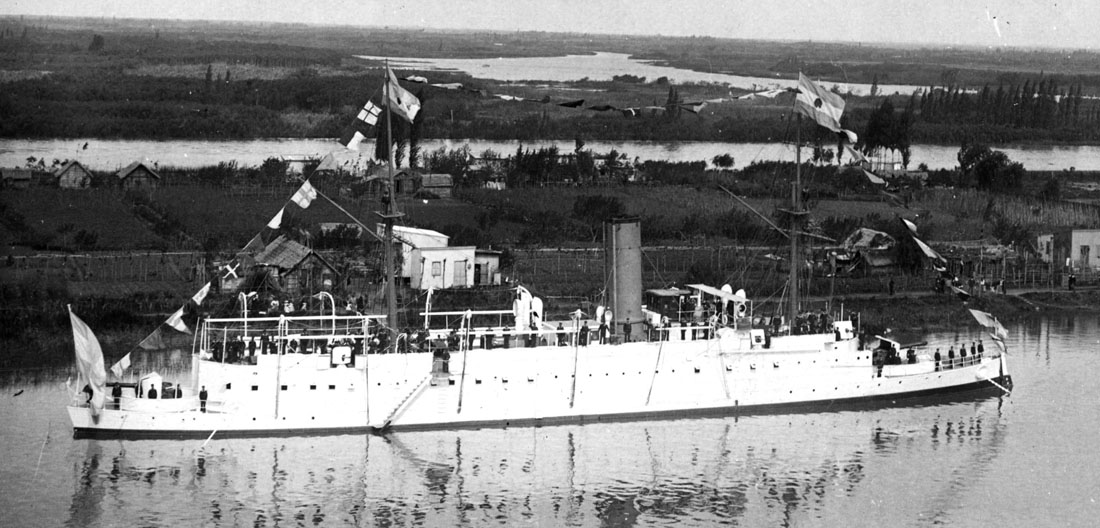
- Cruiser Patagonia

History

Argentina
- Name: Patagonia
- Namesake: The Patagonia region in South America
- Ordered: 1885
- Builder: Stabilimento Tecnico Triestino, Trieste, Austro-Hungarian Empire
- Laid down: 1886
- Launched: 1886
- Completed: 1886
- Commissioned: 1886
- Decommissioned: 1927
- Fate: Scrapped

General characteristics
- Type: Armoured cruiser
- Displacement: 1530 tons
- Length: 67 m (219.8 ft)
- Beam: 10 m (32.8 ft)
- Draft: 7 m (23 ft)
- Propulsion: 2-shaft Horizontal Compound Engines, 2,400 ihp (1,800 kW), 5 cylindrical boilers, 350 tons coal
- Speed: 14 knots (16 mph; 26 km/h)
- Range: 3500 nautical miles
- Complement: 140
- Armament: 1 × 250-millimetre (10 in) Armstrong gun; 3 × 150 mm (5.9 in) Armstrong guns; 4 × 87.5 mm (3.44 in) Armstrong guns; 2 × 62.5 mm (2.46 in) Armstrong guns; 8 Nordenfelt machine guns; 6 Gardner machine guns
- Armour: Protected deck: 30 mm (1.2 in); Glacis over engines: Gun shields: 100 mm (3.9 in); Bridge: 37 mm (1.5 in)

ARA Patagonia was an armoured cruiser that served in the Argentine Navy between 1886 and 1927.

== Design ==
Patagonia was a steam-sail armoured cruiser with steel hull and wooden planking, and armoured conning tower. It was propelled by two compound horizontal engines, and two masts with brick sails.

It was equipped with two searchlights, two small steam boats, and five smaller boats with oars.

As designed, its main battery was one 250mm Armstrong gun at the bow, and one 150mm Armstrong gun at the stern and on each side; with Vavasseur mountings protected with armoured shields. The secondary battery had four 87.5 mm and two 65.2mm Armstrong guns. It also mounted eight Nordenfelt machine guns and six Gardner machine guns.

In 1899, the 250mm gun and two 150mm guns were removed, and the remainder of its artillery was redistributed.

== History ==
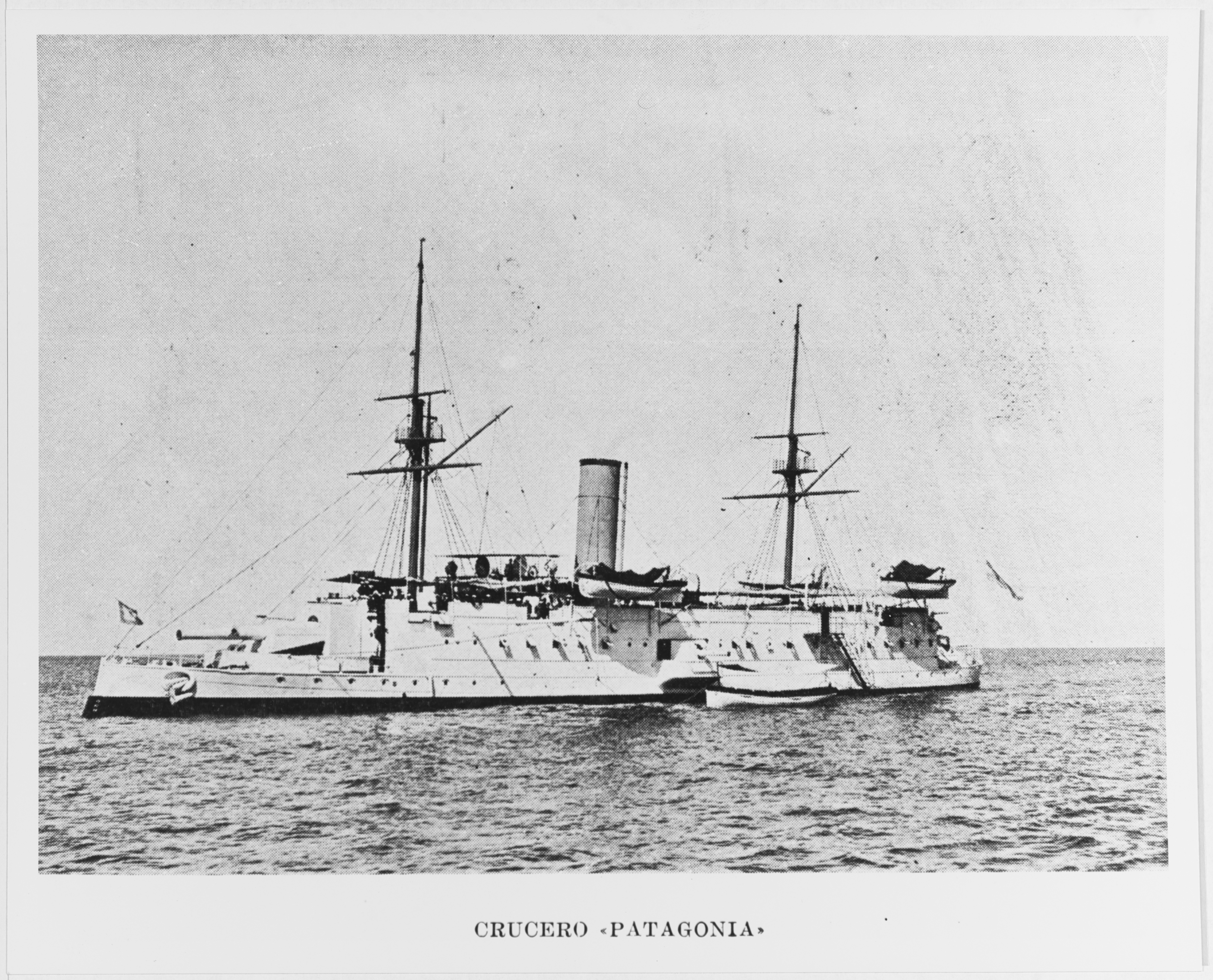
Patagonia at an unknown date

Patagonia was ordered in 1885 to the shipyard Stabilimento Tecnico Triestino in Trieste at a cost of £ 100,000; this transaction was widely criticized in Argentina as the Austro-Hungarian navy was purchasing ships in England rather than locally.

The ship was launched in 1886; its construction was completed that year. After finalizing trials, it departed Trieste on January 20, 1887, arriving in Buenos Aires on February 28 same year.

In January and February 1902 it participated in the naval exercises as part of the 3rd Division; it simulated a blockade of the River Plate in which it was successful.

By 1918, all weapons were removed and it was converted to a transport ship under the same name. It completed two trips between Buenos Aires and Ushuaia before being decommissioned in 1925.

== See also ==
- List of cruisers
- List of ships of the Argentine Navy
