= Portuguese cruiser Dom Carlos I =

Portuguese Navy cruiser

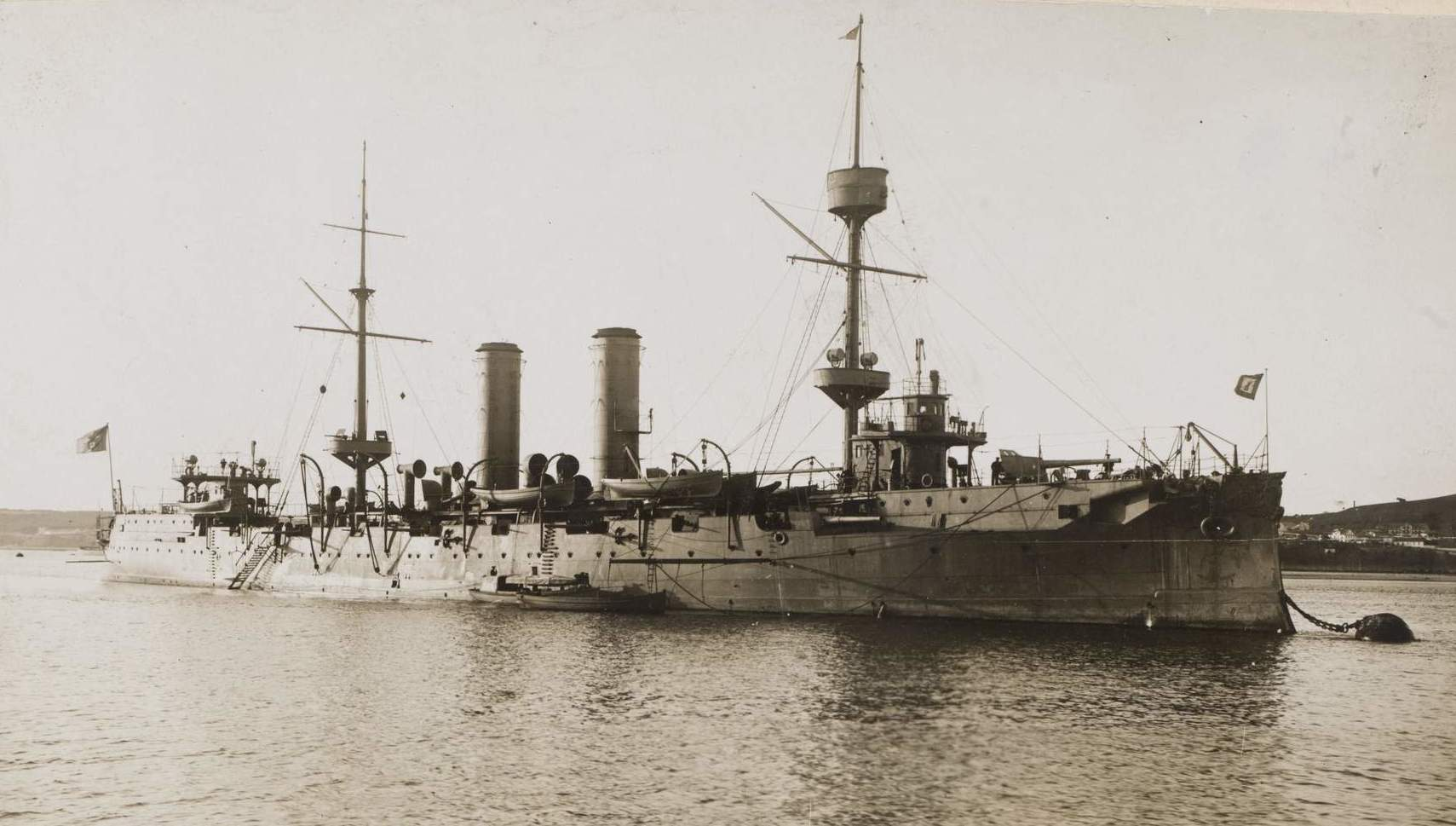
- Dom Carlos I at the beginning of service

History

Portugal
- Name: Dom Carlos I
- Namesake: Carlos I
- Builder: Armstrong, Elswick
- Launched: 5 May 1898
- Commissioned: 8 July 1899
- Decommissioned: 22 January 1925
- Renamed: Almirante Reis
- Fate: Scrapped

General characteristics
- Type: Protected cruiser
- Displacement: 4,186 t
- Length: 118 m (387 ft 2 in)
- Beam: 14.4 m (47 ft 3 in)
- Draft: 5.33 m (17 ft 6 in)
- Propulsion: 12 steam boilers; 2 steam engines; 12,500 hp (9,300 kW); 2 screws
- Speed: 22 knots (41 km/h; 25 mph)
- Complement: 473
- Armament: 4 × single 152 mm (6.0 in) guns; 8 × single 120 mm (4.7 in) guns; 16 × 47 mm (1.9 in) guns; 2 × 37 mm (1.5 in) guns; 5 × 356 mm (14.0 in) torpedo tubes
- Armor: Deck: 110–37 mm (4.3–1.5 in); Command turret: 102 mm (4.0 in)

Dom Carlos I, from 1910 NRP Almirante Reis, was a Portuguese Navy cruiser of the early 20th century, the only ship of its type. It represented a typical protected cruiser design of the British Armstrong shipyard in Elswick of the turn-of-the-century period. Launched in 1898, it entered service the following year. In the course of its service, it performed representative duties and took part in the revolution of October 5, 1910. During World War I, it was withdrawn from active service due to wear on its boilers, and was struck from the fleet list in 1925. It was the largest ship of the Portuguese Navy of its time.

The ship's displacement was 4,186 tons. The main armament consisted of four 152 mm caliber cannons and eight 120 mm caliber guns. It was powered by steam engines, allowing it to develop a speed of 22 knots (41 km/h; 25 mph).

== History ==
The ship was built as part of a program to strengthen the Portuguese Navy in the 1890s, announced by royal decree on March 20, 1890. Its immediate cause was the irritation in relations with the United Kingdom over the issue of African colonies. The ambitious program called for the construction of four coastal defence ships and ten medium-sized cruisers, but the country's poor financial situation made it possible to order only five cruisers and one destroyer over the next decade. Of these, only the Dom Carlos I, named after the currently reigning King Carlos I, was a full-fledged cruiser, while the other four were small craft. It was ordered from the Armstrong Whitworth shipyard in Elswick, England, and represented a typical example of the so-called "Elswick cruisers" that were built for export for many fleets, with the direct model for the design for Portugal being the Yoshino built earlier for Japan. The cruiser was ordered in January 1897. The keel for construction was laid in the same year, the ship was launched on May 5, 1898, and completed the following year.

== Description ==
=== General description and design ===
The ship represented a typical mid-sized cruiser of turn-of-the-century British construction. The hull had raised bow and stern decks with single cannons set on them, and the midship deck, sheltered by a low bulwark, had main caliber cannons and auxiliary artillery set on both sides. The bow was ram-shaped, and the stern strake had a forward-sloping form, symmetrical to the bow. The bow superstructure was small, and the ship's silhouette was completed by two massive masts and two thin tall chimneys amidships, in the middle of the hull's length. The masts had two battle tops each. The hull was steel, covered in the underwater part with a layer of wood and copper sheet. The hull was double, and additional side protection in the boiler and engine room area was provided by coal compartments (cofferdams) typical of cruisers of the period.

Normal displacement was 4,186 tons. (Note: Displacement of 4,186 t is given in most sources, without further specification.(Jane’s (1990, p. 288)Gardiner, Chesneau & Kolesnik (1979, p. 378)) The period source also states 4,250 t(Notes on Naval Progress (1899, p. 108)) The length overall was 118 meters, and the length between perpendiculars was 110 meters. (Note: Overall length according to Notes on Naval Progress (1899, p. 108) (original 387 feet - 117.96 meters), while Lisycyn (2015, p. 267) provides 117 meters. Publications generally provide only the length between perpendiculars of 360 feet 10 inches (109.98 meters) according to Gardiner, Chesneau & Kolesnik (1979, p. 378) or 110 meters according to Lisycyn (2015, p. 267), while Notes on Naval Progress (1899, p. 108) provides 360 feet (109.73 meters).) The hull width was 14.4 meters, and the draft was 5.33 meters.

=== Armament ===
The main armament consisted of four single 152 mm caliber guns and eight single 120 mm caliber guns. The 152 mm guns, with protective shields, were positioned on the fore and aft decks and on the side sponsons of the upper deck at the level of the bow mast (they could fire to some extent in the direction of the bow and to the sides). The remaining artillery was positioned on the sides, and the last pair of 120 mm guns could fire towards the stern. The broadside was formed by three 152 mm and four 120 mm guns. The 152 mm guns, with a barrel length of L/45 (45 caliber), marked A.(tr.)15/45 in Portugal, probably represented the British export CC1 model of the Elswick works. They fired anti-tank and semi-tank shells weighing 39.9 kilograms. The 120 mm cannon, with a barrel length of L/45 (actually 43.96 caliber) designated A.(tr.)12/45, were the British export model Y and fired semi-tank shells weighing 20.4 kilograms. (Note: This is what Friedman (2011, p. 315), states in his detailed monograph on naval artillery. Some more general publications give the misguided L/40 barrel length (Lisycyn (2015, p. 267)) or the completely misguided and unused 127 mm caliber in Europe (Anca & Mitiuckow (2011, p. 19)))

The auxiliary armament consisted of 16 47 mm caliber QF 3-pounder Hotchkiss guns and two 37 mm caliber L/25 revolver cannons. (Note: 16 47 mm cannons are provided by Lisycyn (2015, p. 267) in the main text and Gardiner, Chesneau & Kolesnik (1979, p. 378) (3-pounder guns). It is possible that by the outbreak of World War I the number of 47 mm cannons had decreased to 14, according to some sources (Jane’s (1990, p. 288), Bałakin (1999, p. 22) and Lisycyn (2015, p. 267) in the table). An 1899 pre-service source reported 12 47 mm cannons, 6 37 mm cannons and 4 machine guns (Notes on Naval Progress (1899, p. 108)). Anca & Mitiuckow (2011, p. 19) report 16 cannons of 57 mm caliber, contrary to most literature.) The 47 mm caliber guns were placed in positions in the sides at the bow and stern (two pairs, firing forward and aft), amidships and on the lower battle marts. The armament also included three machine guns. The armament was supplemented by five single 356 mm caliber torpedo tubes. Three of the torpedo tubes were underwater, fixed - in the bow stern, firing forward, and two in the bow section, firing sideways. Two more tubes were above-water, movable, installed in the sides behind the engine room. By the outbreak of World War I, only two above-water tubes remained.

=== Armor ===
The armor was an inner-armored deck 37 mm thick in the center section and 110 mm thick on the side haunches. (Note: This is according to Lisycyn (2015, p. 267), Anca & Mitiuckow (2011, p. 19), Gardiner, Chesneau & Kolesnik (1979, p. 378) (in the latter, 1.5-inches and 4.3 inches, respectively). According to a period source, the deck had armor 1.75 inches (44 mm) thick on the flat part and 4 inches (102 mm) thick on the haunches (Notes on Naval Progress (1899, p. 108))) The armored deck extended the entire length. In addition, the command turret had 102 mm thick armor. (Note: According to period sources, the command turret had 100 mm armor. Notes on Naval Progress (1899, p. 108)) According to some sources, also the 120 mm caliber cannons had 76 mm thick protective masks (there is no information about the masks of 152 mm caliber cannons).

=== Propulsion ===
It was powered by two vertical four-cylinder compound engines with two low-pressure cylinders, manufactured by Hawthorn, Leslie & Co. Cylinder diameters were: 30.5 inches, 49 inches and two of 56 inches each, and the piston stroke was 27 inches. The engine room had a total design power of 12,500 hp and powered two propellers. A novelty was the use of 12 Yarrow water-tube boilers. The boilers had a total heated area of 2973 m^{2}. During trials, the ship developed a speed of 22.15 knots (41.02 km/h; 25.49 mph) with forced draft (it was estimated that it could develop 22.5 knots, 41.7 km/h, 25.9 mph in good weather). At the beginning of World War I, the cruiser was capable of developing 19 knots. The fuel-coal reserve was normally 700 tons, with a maximum of 1,000 tons. The maximum coal reserve was unusually large for a ship of this size and allowed for a long range of about 10,000 nautical miles (19,000 km; 12,000 mi) at 10 knots (19 km/h; 12 mph), suitable for service in the Portuguese Empire.

=== Equipment ===
The ship had a power plant in the form of auxiliary machinery driving generators. It was equipped with three combat searchlights. In 1902, it was the first in the Portuguese Navy to receive a radio communication station experimentally. In 1911, it was equipped with optical rangefinders, also the first in the Portuguese Navy.

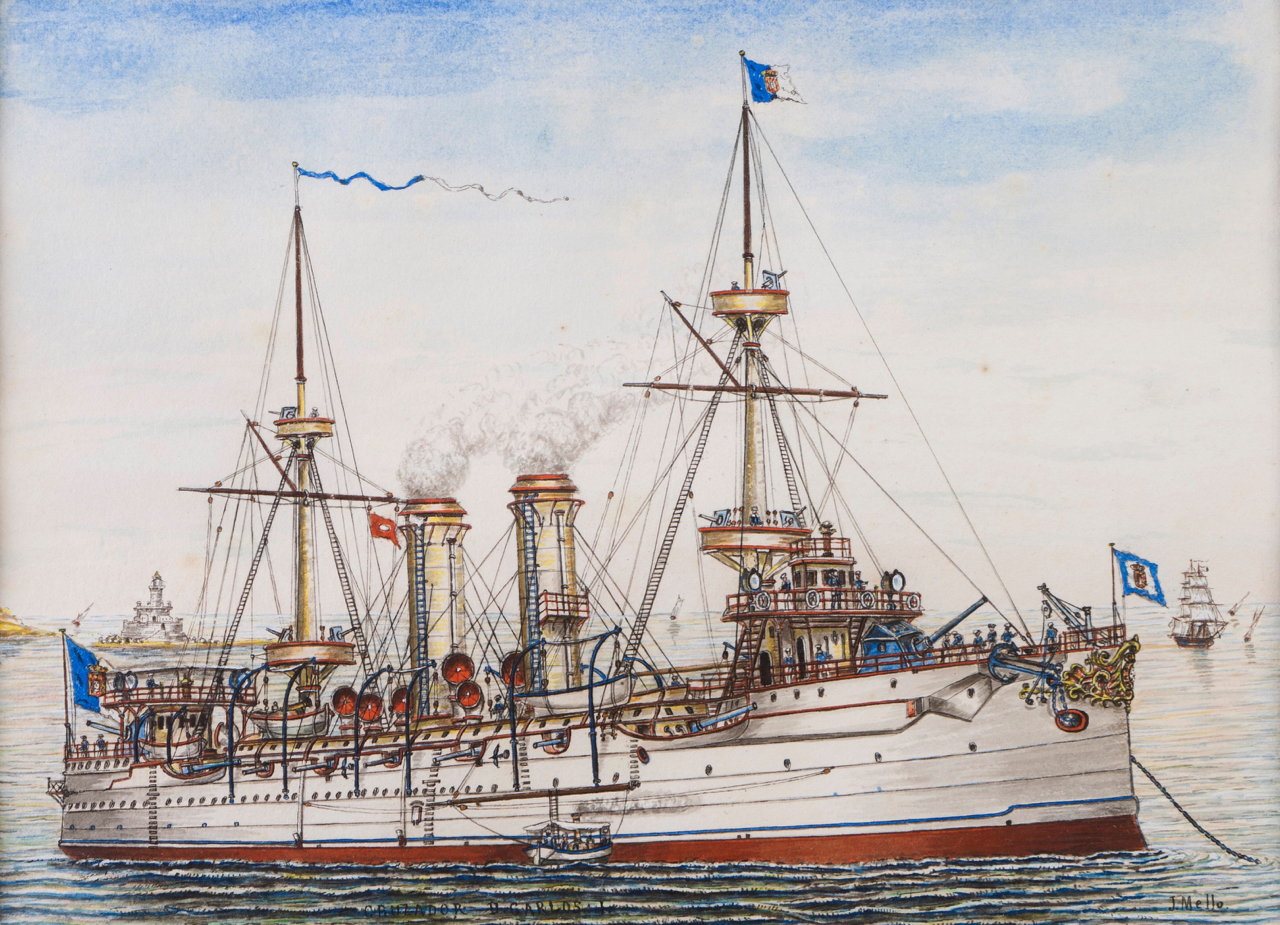
Image of the cruiser after entering service, under the royal flag

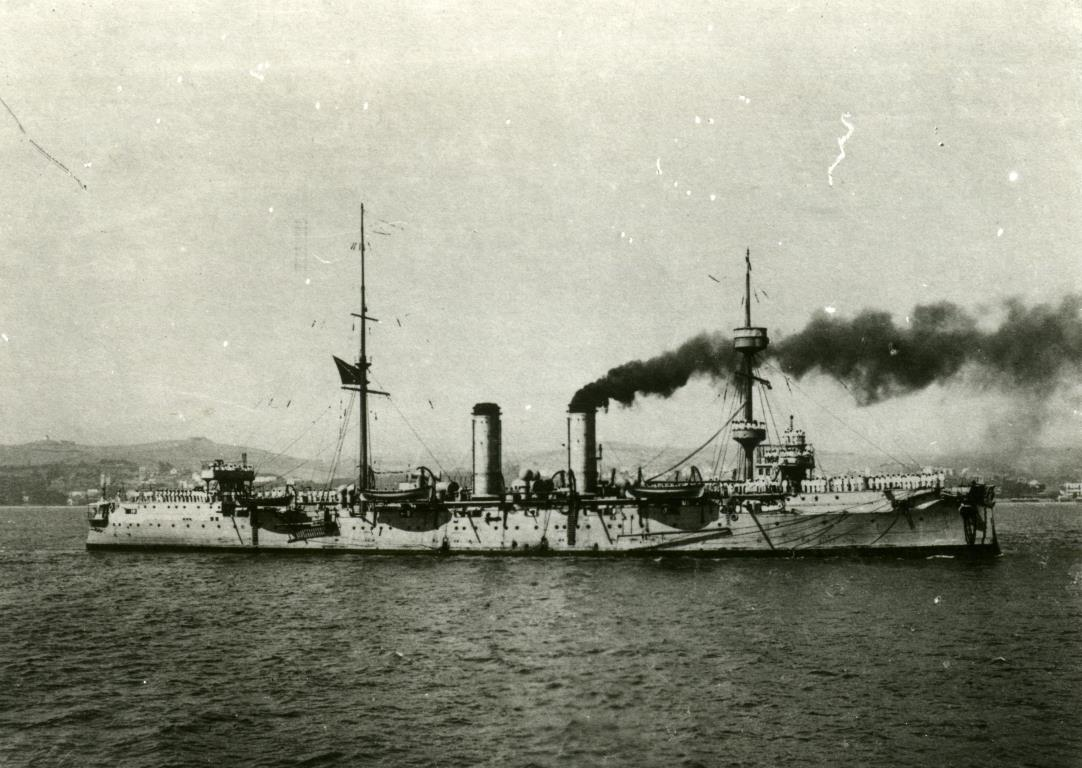
Almirante Reis

== Service ==
Dom Carlos I was the largest ship of the Portuguese Navy throughout its service. The ship was commissioned on July 8, 1899, by the Portuguese. As the fleet's most modern vessel, it was used for representational purposes in addition to its normal service. In April 1900, it served as the royal family's yacht during a trip to Madeira, and on April 9 it participated in the celebration of the 400th anniversary of the discovery of Brazil and was visited by that country's president in Rio de Janeiro. In August of that year, during a visit to Ferrol, it was visited by the Spanish royal family, and in October it took part in the international celebration of the unveiling of the statue of Prince Henry the Navigator in Porto, where it took the Portuguese royal family. In January 1901, Dom Carlos I represented Portugal at the celebrations in Portsmouth for the funeral of Queen Victoria. In June 1902, it took part in a naval revue on the Spithead roadstead outside Portsmouth to celebrate the coronation of Edward VII, with Portuguese heir to the throne Prince Luís Filipe. It was also in this year that the cruiser began the Portuguese Navy's first experiments with radiotelegraph communications. In 1905, the cruiser was sent to Madeira as the island was placed under quarantine due to an epidemic.

During this period, Portugal was troubled by internal unrest. In April 1906, the cruiser's crew joined a mutiny by the crew of the coastal defense battleship Vasco da Gama, which ended with the surrender of the mutinous ships. The cruiser was then sent for overhaul, which was completed the following year. In September 1907, Dom Carlos I became part of the Training Squadron, grouping the most valuable ships. In 1908, the king whose name the ship bore was assassinated and his successor Manuel II ascended to the throne. In the spring of 1910, the cruiser paid a visit to Argentina to celebrate its centennial of independence. On October 4, 1910, Dom Carlos I was in Lisbon when the revolution of October 5, 1910 took place in Portugal. Its crew initially did not join the two other mutinous cruisers Adamastor and São Rafael, but in the evening of that day they were successfully agitated and joined the revolutionaries, with the ship's commander and three officers opposed to the revolution killed. The cruiser's sailors then took part in the brief clashes that led to the overthrow of the monarchy. Soon after, in December 1910, the monarchist name of the ship was changed to Cândido Reis and eventually Almirante Reis (in honor of one of the leaders of the revolution - Admiral Carlos Cândido dos Reis - who died during the revolution).

The cruiser remained in service during World War I. Initially, when Portugal was neutral, it protected convoys between Portugal and its colonies (Angola and Mozambique) from 1914 to 1915. However, this strained the ship's boilers, which needed repairs, and meant that it was no longer used actively in the remainder of the war when Portugal joined the Triple Entente side in 1916. It went to sea for the last time in January 1916, after which it was sent to reserve. In 1917, the boiler fighters were replaced, but this proved insufficient. In April 1918, the ship was disarmed and converted to a habitation hulk. (Note: Also encountered in older publications is the version that in 1918 the ship was partially dismantled and sent for a lengthy overhaul, ultimately not completed, and withdrawn in 1923 (e.g., Jane’s (1990, p. 288), Gardiner, Robert; Gray, Randal, eds. (1985). Conway's All The World's Fighting Ships 1906–1921. London: Conway Maritime Press. p. 372. ISBN 0-85177-245-5.)) The ship was struck from the fleet list on January 22, 1925, before being sold to the Netherlands for ship-breaking a month later. According to one version, the ship's hull was then seized by the Dutch navy before being bombed and sunk by the Germans in 1940, but there is no reliable confirmation of this story.

== Bibliography ==
- Anca, Alejandro A.; Mitiuckow, Nikołaj (2011). "Krążowniki Portugalii". Okręty Wojenne. XVIII (109). Tarnowskie Góry: Wydawnictwo Okręty Wojenne. ISSN 1231-014X.
- Bałakin, Siergiej (1999). "WMS małych stran Jewropy 1914-1918 gg". Morskaja Kollekcyja (in Russian) (3/1999 (27)). Moscow.
- Friedman, Norman (2011). Naval weapons of World War One. Seaforth Publishing. ISBN 978-1-84832-100-7.
- Gardiner, Robert; Chesneau, Roger; Kolesnik, Eugene, eds. (1979). Conway's All The World's Fighting Ships 1860–1905. London: Conway Maritime Press. ISBN 0-85177-133-5.
- Jane's Fighting Ships of World War I. London: Random House Group. 1990 [1919]. ISBN 1-85170-378-0.John Moore (introduction)
- Lisycyn, Fiodor (2015). Kriejsiera Pierwoj Mirowoj. Unikalnaja encykłopiedija. Arsenał Kollekcyja (in Russian). Moscow: Jauza – Eksmo. ISBN 978-5-699-84344-2.
- Office of Naval Intelligence (1899). Notes on Naval Progress. General Information Series: Information from Abroad. U.S. Government Printing Office. No. XVIII.
