= Ottoman cruiser Heibetnuma =

Unprotected cruiser built during the Ottoman Empire

History

Ottoman Empire
- Name: Heibetnuma
- Builder: Constantinople
- Laid down: 1881
- Fate: Scrapped in 1911

General characteristics (as designed)
- Type: unprotected cruiser
- Displacement: 1463 t
- Length: 226 ft (68.9 m)
- Beam: 37 ft (11.3 m)
- Draft: 17 ft (5.2 m)
- Propulsion: 1 shaft HTE, 2,785 ihp (2,077 kW)
- Speed: 14 knots (26 km/h; 16 mph)
- Armament: 3 × 1 – 6.7-inch (170 mm) guns; 6 × 1 – 4.7-inch (119 mm) guns; 4 × 1 – 47-millimeter (1.9 in) guns; 2 × 1 – 14-inch (356 mm) torpedo tubes

Heibetnuma was an unprotected cruiser with a composite hull of the Ottoman Navy, laid down in 1881 at the Constantinople dockyard and completed in 1893. The ship had six rectangular boilers and carried about 280 tons of coal. The main armament was three Krupp 6.7in/25 caliber 5.6 ton breechloading guns, mounted fore and aft. The secondary guns were six Krupp 4.7in/25 BL guns in sponsons amidships.

This ship and the slightly smaller cruiser Lütf-ü Hümayun were similar in armament and performance to the Miaoulis, an unprotected cruiser acquired in 1879 for the navy of the Ottoman Empire's main naval rival, Greece. The Russian Black Sea Fleet, another threat to the Ottoman navy, included the slightly larger unprotected cruiser Pamiat Merkuria.

== Bibliography ==
- Gardiner, Robert, ed. (1979). Conway's All the World's Fighting Ships 1860–1905. New York: Mayflower Books. ISBN 0-8317-0302-4.
