= Ottoman cruiser Lütf-ü Hümayun =

Ottoman unprotected cruiser

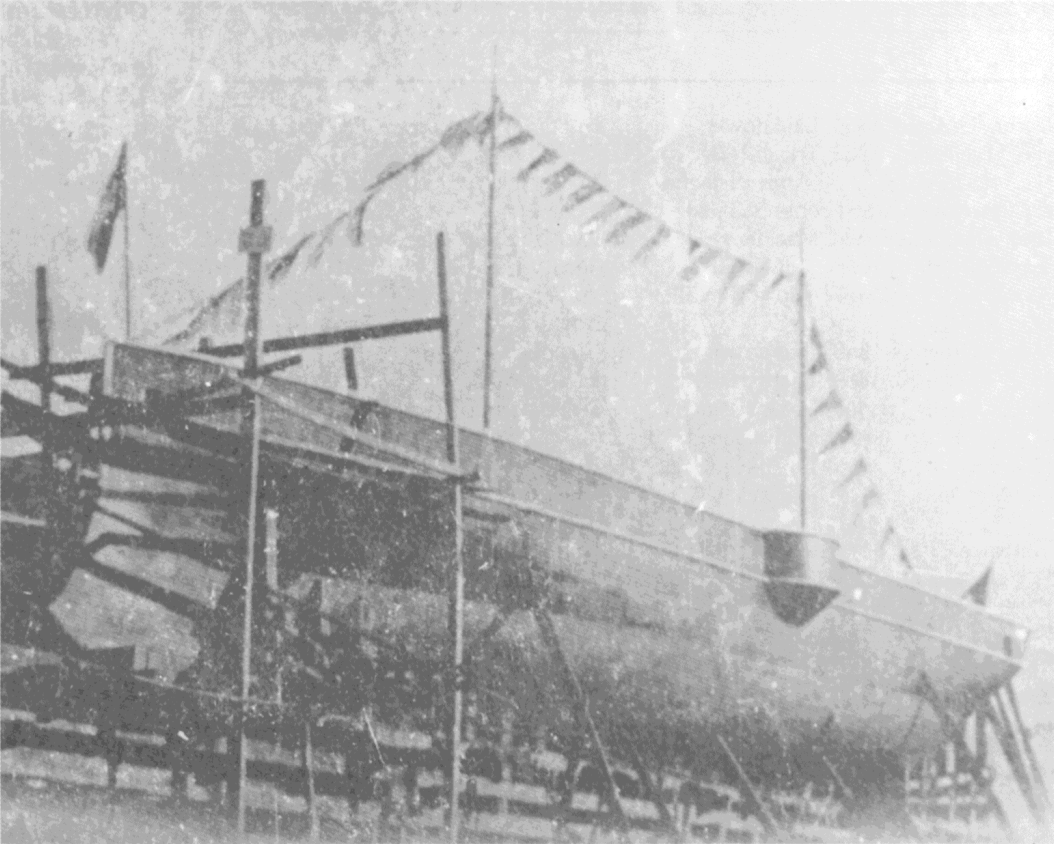
- One of two only known images of Lütf-ü Hümayun

History

Ottoman Empire
- Name: Lütf-ü Hümayun
- Builder: Tersâne-i Âmire, Istanbul
- Laid down: 1881
- Launched: 16 August 1892
- Commissioned: October 1896
- Decommissioned: 1908
- Fate: Scrapped, November 1909

General characteristics (as designed)
- Type: Unprotected cruiser
- Displacement: 1,313 t (1,292 long tons; 1,447 short tons)
- Length: 210 ft (64.0 m)
- Beam: 30 ft (9.1 m)
- Draft: 13 ft (4.0 m)
- Propulsion: 1 shaft HTE, 2,785 ihp (2,077 kW)
- Speed: 14 knots (26 km/h; 16 mph)
- Armament: 3 × 1 – 6.7-inch (170 mm) guns; 6 × 1 – 4.7-inch (119 mm) guns; 4 × 1 – 47-millimeter (1.9 in) guns; 2 × 1 – 14-inch (356 mm) torpedo tubes

Lütf-ü Hümayun was an unprotected cruiser of the Ottoman Navy.

Ordered in 1880, the construction of the ship started in 1882 at the Tersâne-i Âmire shipyard in Istanbul. She was launched on 16 August 1892. Sea trials were conducted in July 1896. In October 1896, she was commissioned in Istanbul as a stationary training ship. In 1905, her guns, machinery and masts were dismantled. Plans to rebuild her in Istanbul by Ansaldo did not materialize. Decommissioned in 1908, she was sold for scrap in November 1909.

== Design ==
Lutf-ü Hümayun was 64 metres long, 9.1 metres wide and had a draft of 3.9 metres. She displaced 1313 tons. The ship was built with a composite of iron and wood. She was a scaled-down version of the design of her half-sister Heibetnuma. She had a single chimney.

The ship was powered by a single vertical triple expansion steam engine with three cylinders turning a screw. Built by Tersane-i Amire, the engine received its steam from coal-fired boilers. The engine was capable of producing 2,160 ihp (1,610 kW). The maximum designed speed of the ship was 14 kn (26 km/h; 16 mph), the ship reached 12 knots in trials. She had a coal capacity of 205 tons.

The ship's original design included four 170 mm L/25 QF Krupp guns, six 120 mm L/25 QF Krupp guns, four 47 mm QF Hotchkiss guns, six machine guns and two 450 mm torpedo tubes. When she entered service in 1896, she carried three 170 mm L/25 QF Krupp guns forward, six 120 mm L/25 QF Krupp guns, six 47 mm QF Hotchkiss guns and two 450 mm torpedo tubes on sponsons amidships. In 1899 her armament was changed to two 150 mm L/40 QF Krupp guns, two 120 mm L/25 QF Krupp guns, four 37 mm QF guns, two 450 mm torpedo tubes. In 1905 her guns were dismantled.

== Service history ==
The construction of Lütf-ü Hümayun ordered in 1880 started in 1882 at Tersâne-i Âmire. She was launched on 16 August 1892 after ten years of construction and after four years of outfitting, sea trials were conducted in July 1896. She entered service in October 1896. She spent her career as a stationary training ship in Istanbul. In 1905, her guns, machinery and masts were dismantled. Although she was planned to be rebuilt by Ansaldo in Istanbul, this did not happen. Decommissioned in 1908, she was sold as scrap for dismantling in November 1909. Her dismantling lasted until 1921.
