= Hüdâvendigâr-class cruiser =

Ottoman Navy cruiser

Class overview
- Name: Hüdâvendigâr class
- Builders: Tersâne-i Âmire, Istanbul at Constantinople
- Operators: Ottoman Navy
- Built: 1892–1911
- Planned: 2
- Canceled: 2

General characteristics (as designed)
- Type: Cruiser
- Displacement: 4050 t
- Length: 280 ft (85.3 m)
- Beam: 50 ft (15.2 m)
- Draft: 20 ft (6.1 m)
- Propulsion: 1 shaft
- Armament: 2 × 1 – 8.3 in. guns; 6 × 1 – 5.9 in. guns; 4 × 1 – 4.1 in. guns; 5 × 1 – torpedo tubes

The Hüdâvendigâr-class cruiser was to have been a two ship class of cruiser built for the Ottoman Navy in the early 1890s. Only one ship was laid down, but she was never completed.

The Ottoman Empire laid down the first ship, Hüdâvendigâr, in 1892 at the Constantinople dockyard. She, and her projected sister, Selimieh, were to be fitted with a comparatively heavy main armament (two 8.3-inch guns) for their size. The arming of a medium-sized cruiser with heavy guns was a trend established by ships such as Esmeralda designed by Armstrong/Elswick shipyards for the Chilean Navy and launched in 1883. Three of the Ottoman Empire's potential Mediterranean naval rivals (Italy, Spain and Austria-Hungary) built protected cruisers of this type. One of the immediate improvements on Esmeralda was the cruiser Giovanni Bausan built for Italy, followed by the Italian-built Etna class of four ships (launched 1883–1888). The three Spanish Reina Regente-class ships were launched 1887–1892, and the Austro-Hungarian navy's two Kaiser Franz Joseph I class ships were launched in 1889–1890. However, this general type of “over-gunned” protected cruiser fell out of favor during the time Hüdâvendigâr was under construction. In 1904, Hüdâvendigâr was still incomplete (in frame and partially plated), and the Ottoman navy redesigned the ship to carry a lighter armament of two 6-inch or 5.9-inch quick-firing (QF) guns, 6 4.7-inch QF guns, 4 3-inch QF guns, 4 47mm guns, and 4 torpedo tubes (all in single mountings). However, the ship was never completed and scrapped on the slip about 1911, by which time the Ottoman navy had purchased two foreign-built protected cruisers with a quick-firing armament, Mecidiye and Hamidiye.

== Bibliography ==
- Gardiner, Robert, ed. (1979). Conway's All the World's Fighting Ships 1860–1905. New York: Mayflower Books. ISBN 0-8317-0302-4.
