= List of battlecruisers of Germany =

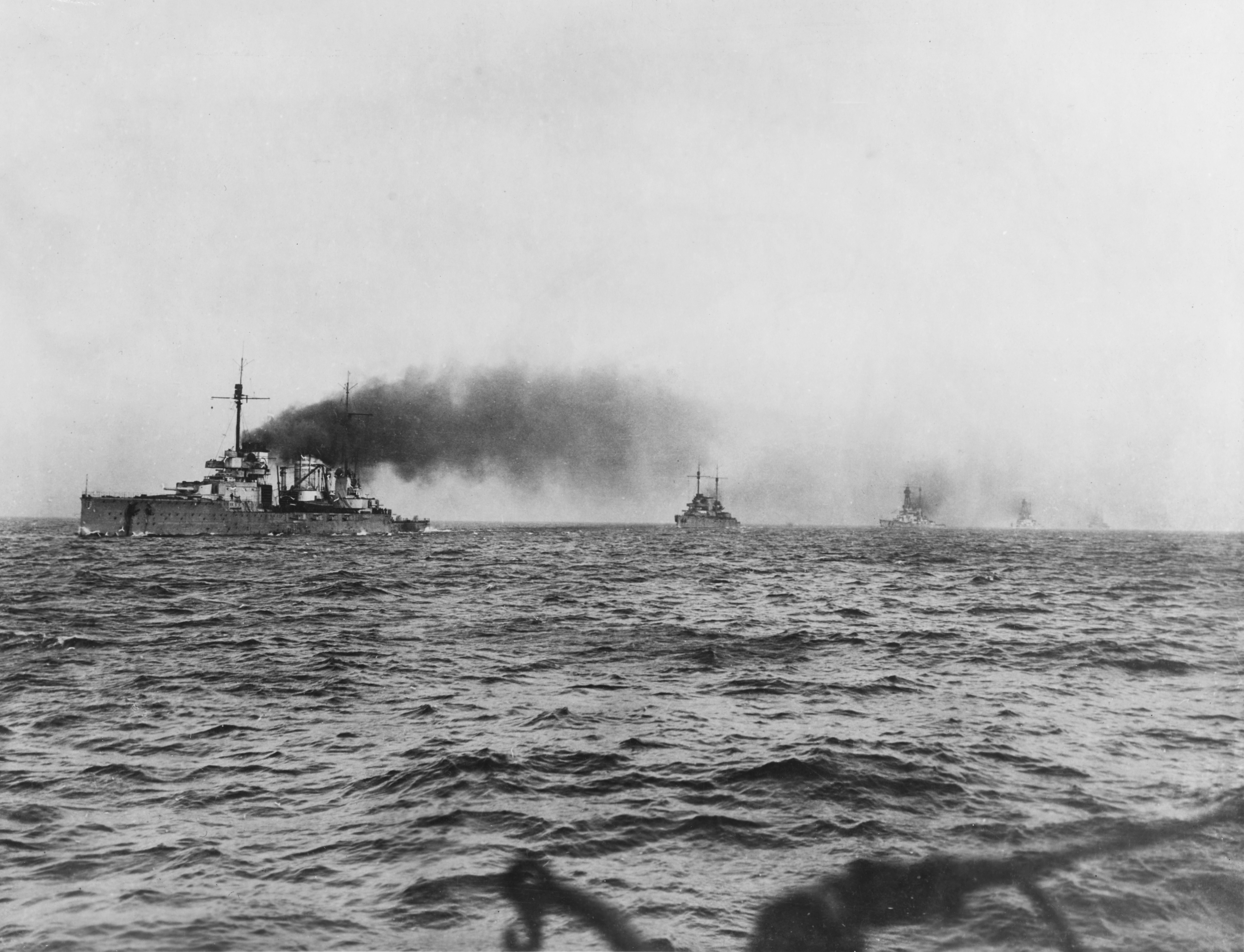
Seydlitz leads Moltke, Hindenburg, Derfflinger and Von der Tann into internment in Scapa Flow

The Kaiserliche Marine, the navy of the German Empire, built a series of battlecruisers in the first half of the 20th century. The battlecruiser type was an outgrowth of older armored cruiser designs; they were intended to scout for the main battle fleet and attack the reconnaissance forces of opposing fleets. Kaiser Wilhelm II insisted that the new battlecruisers be able to fight in the line of battle with battleships to counter Germany's numerical inferiority compared to the British Royal Navy.

SMS Von der Tann was the first German battlecruiser, built in 1908–1910. The Kaiserliche Marine eventually built four more battlecruisers before the start of the First World War to serve with the High Seas Fleet, and another two were completed during the conflict. A further seven were planned, including four of the Mackensen and three of the Ersatz Yorck-class ships. Two of the Mackensens—the name ship and Graf Spee—were launched but never completed, and the other two were in earlier stages of work when they were canceled towards the end of the war. Serious work never began on the three Ersatz Yorck-class ships.

Six of the seven battlecruisers completed before or during World War I saw relatively heavy combat, primarily in the North Sea. All of the ships, with the exception of Goeben, which had been assigned to the German Mediterranean Division, were assigned to the I Scouting Group under the command of Admiral Franz von Hipper. The unit conducted several raids of the English coast between 1914 and 1916, which culminated in the Battle of Jutland during 31 May – 1 June 1916, in which they were expected to draw parts of the British fleet onto the German battleship line. The German flagship Lützow was scuttled by her crew, on the way back to port, and the other ships were heavily damaged. For their own part, during the battle Von der Tann sank her counterpart HMS Indefatigable,Seydlitz sank Queen Mary, and Derfflinger and Lützow together destroyed Invincible. The four remaining battlecruisers—Von der Tann, Moltke, Seydlitz, and Derfflinger saw little further activity in 1917 and 1918, during which time they were reinforced by Hindenburg. The ships were interned with the bulk of the German fleet at the British naval base at Scapa Flow following the end of the war in November 1918. There, they were scuttled by their crews in 1919 to prevent them from falling into the hands of the Allied Powers. Goeben was transferred to the Ottoman Navy at the outbreak of hostilities, and operated against the Russian Black Sea Fleet for the majority of the war. She was heavily damaged by British naval mines near the end of the war, but was repaired and went on to serve the Turkish Navy until the 1950s; she was eventually broken up for scrap in the 1970s.

The eventual successor to the Kaiserliche Marine, the Kriegsmarine of Nazi Germany, considered building three O-class battlecruisers before World War II as part of the Plan Z buildup of the navy. The outbreak of war in 1939 caused the plans to be shelved, and none of these ships were built. (Note: The two Scharnhorst-class warships have been referred to as battlecruisers, especially in British works. The Kriegsmarine classified them as battleships, and a significant majority of scholarly works refer to them as such; hence, they are not included in this list.)

Key
Main guns	The number and type of the main battery guns
Displacement	Ship displacement at full combat load
Propulsion	Number of shafts, type of propulsion system, and top speed generated
Service	The dates work began and finished on the ship and its ultimate fate
Laid down	The date the keel began to be assembled
Commissioned	The date the ship was Commissioned

== Kaiserliche Marine ==
=== SMS Von der Tann ===
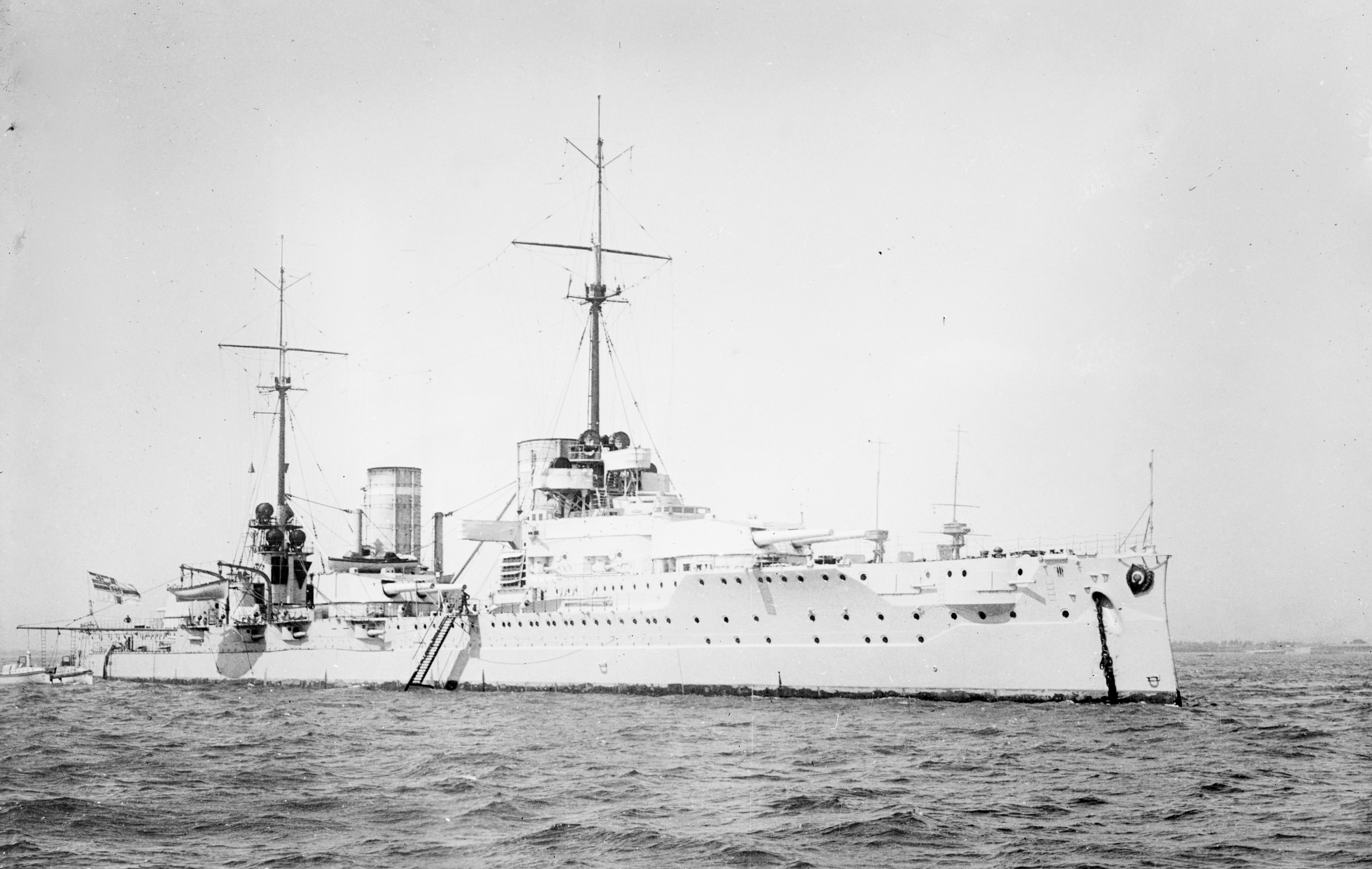
Von der Tann

SMS Von der Tann was the first German battlecruiser, ordered in 1907. She was designed in response to the British Invincible-class battlecruisers, construction on which had begun the previous year. As the first of a new type, the design process for Von der Tann was highly controversial. Admiral Alfred von Tirpitz, the State Secretary for the Imperial German Navy, wanted the ship to follow the British example, incorporating large guns, relatively light armor, and high speed. Kaiser Wilhelm II, along with other senior navy officers instead argued that, owing to Germany's numerical inferiority, the new ships should have armor strong enough to permit their use in the battle line. The ships would therefore sacrifice the caliber of their main batteries to offset the greater weight of heavier armor protection. A significant increase in speed compared to earlier armored cruisers was obtained by replacing old triple-expansion steam engines with more powerful steam turbines; Von der Tann was the first large German warship to be fitted with turbine propulsion.

Upon entering service, Von der Tann joined the fleet's main reconnaissance unit, I Scouting Group. The ship was present for most of the German fleet operations during World War I, including several raids of the English coast between 1914 and 1916. At the Battle of Jutland on 31 May – 1 June 1916, Von der Tann was the last ship in the German battlecruiser squadron. She engaged HMS Indefatigable and, after 15 minutes of firing, Von der Tann scored a hit with one of her 28 cm shells that caused a magazine explosion, destroying Indefatigable. Von der Tann was herself badly damaged in the course of the action, and had at one point had all four of her turrets disabled, but was repaired after the battle and returned to service. She saw no further action, however, as the Germans turned to the U-boat campaign against British merchant shipping after Jutland. At the end of the war, Von der Tann was interned in Scapa Flow and eventually scuttled with the rest of the fleet. She was raised in 1930 and broken up for scrap between 1931 and 1934.

Summary of the Von der Tann class
Ship	Armament	Displacement	Propulsion	Service		
Ship	Armament	Displacement	Propulsion	Laid down	Commissioned	Fate
SMS Von der Tann	8 × 28 cm (11 in) SK L/45 guns	21,300 t (21,000 long tons)	4 screws, Parsons steam turbines, 27.75 knots (51.39 km/h; 31.93 mph)	21 March 1908	1 September 1910	Scuttled at Scapa Flow on 21 June 1919, wreck raised 1930s and scrapped, 1931–1934

=== Moltke class ===
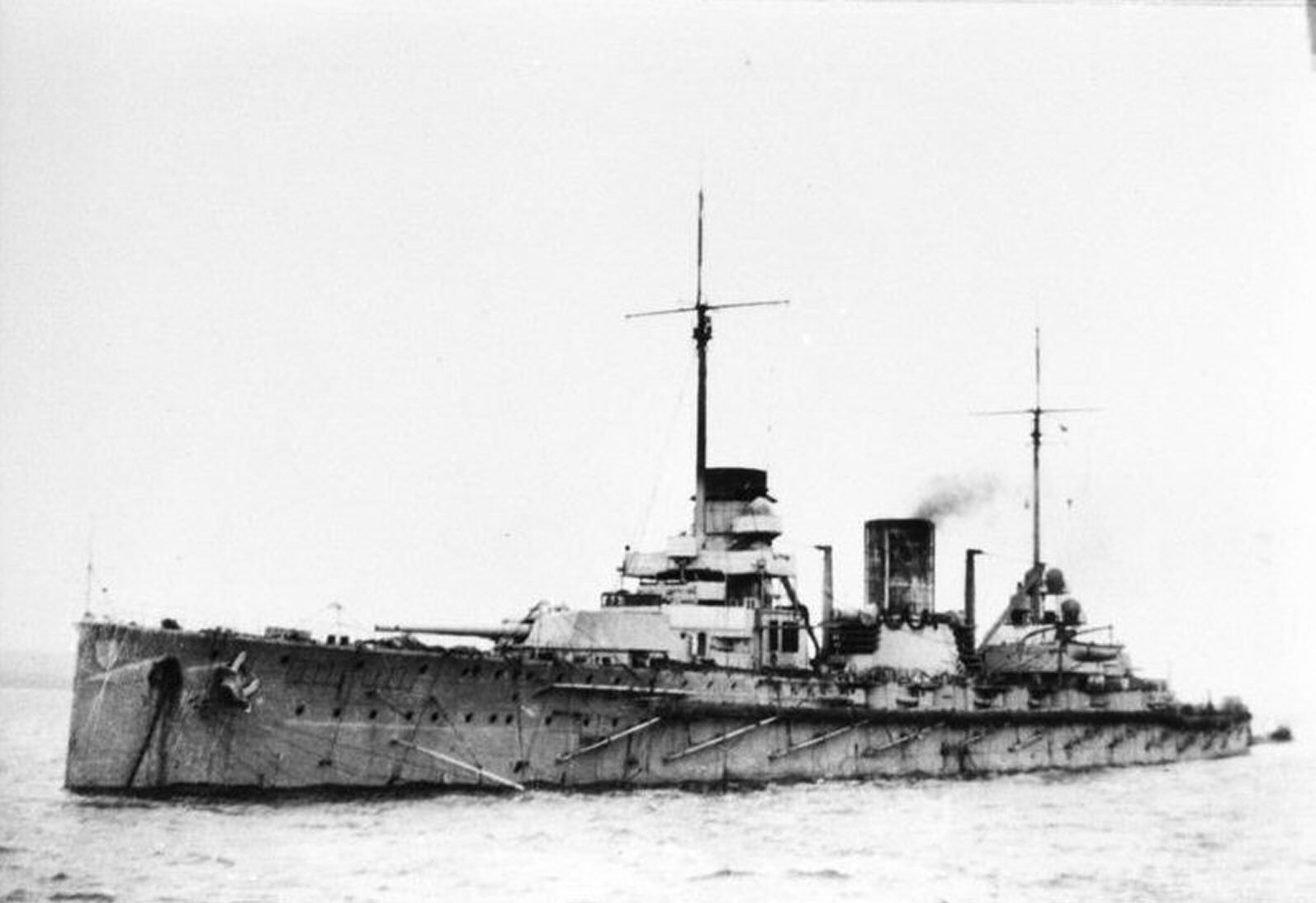
Goeben in port

Moltke and Goeben, improvements over the preceding Von der Tann, were ordered in 1908 and 1909, respectively. While their design was not as contentious as with the Von der Tann, there were still disagreements between Tirpitz and elements of the German naval administration over whether the main battery guns should be increased in number or caliber. Tirpitz and the Construction Office favored the increase to ten guns, while the General Office preferred repeating Von der Tann but with eight 30.5 cm (12 in) guns, to mirror the development from the contemporary Nassau and Helgoland classes of dreadnought battleships. It was eventually decided that ten 28 cm guns would be mounted, though new, longer-barreled versions were adopted. The longer barrels increased muzzle velocity, which in turn offered improved armor penetration. In addition to the increased main battery, the two Moltke-class ships were slightly larger and better armored than Von der Tann.

Moltke joined Von der Tann in the battlecruiser squadron upon her commissioning, and saw action against the British in the North Sea, including the Battle of Dogger Bank in January 1915, in addition to the coastal raids carried out in the first two years of the war. The ship also saw significant duty in the Baltic Sea against the Russian navy; in 1915 she was present at the Battle of the Gulf of Riga, where she was torpedoed by a British submarine, and in 1917, she returned to the Baltic as the flagship of the invasion force that conducted Operation Albion. Moltke was also interned in Scapa Flow at the end of the war and scuttled in 1919. Goeben, on the other hand, was assigned to the Mediterranean in 1912 to serve as the flagship of the Mediterranean Division. At the outbreak of war in 1914, Goeben and the light cruiser Breslau evaded the British fleet and escaped to Constantinople, where they were transferred to the Ottoman Navy, though they remained under German command and with their original crews. The ship primarily operated in the Black Sea against the Russians, seeing combat at the Battle of Cape Sarych and the actions of 10 May 1915 and 8 January 1916. She attacked British forces outside the Dardanelles in 1918 and struck three mines. The ship continued in Turkish service until 1973 when she was sold for scrapping.

Summary of the Moltke class
Ship	Armament	Displacement	Propulsion	Service		
Ship	Armament	Displacement	Propulsion	Laid down	Commissioned	Fate
SMS Moltke	10 × 28 cm SK L/50 guns	25,400 t (25,000 long tons)	4 screws, Parsons steam turbines, 28.4 kn (52.6 km/h; 32.7 mph)	7 December 1908	30 August 1911	Scuttled at Scapa Flow on 21 June 1919, wreck raised 1927 and scrapped
SMS Goeben	10 × 28 cm SK L/50 guns	25,400 t (25,000 long tons)	4 screws, Parsons steam turbines, 28 kn (52 km/h; 32 mph)	28 August 1909	2 July 1912	Transferred to the Ottoman Empire on 16 August 1914, scrapped in 1973

=== SMS Seydlitz ===
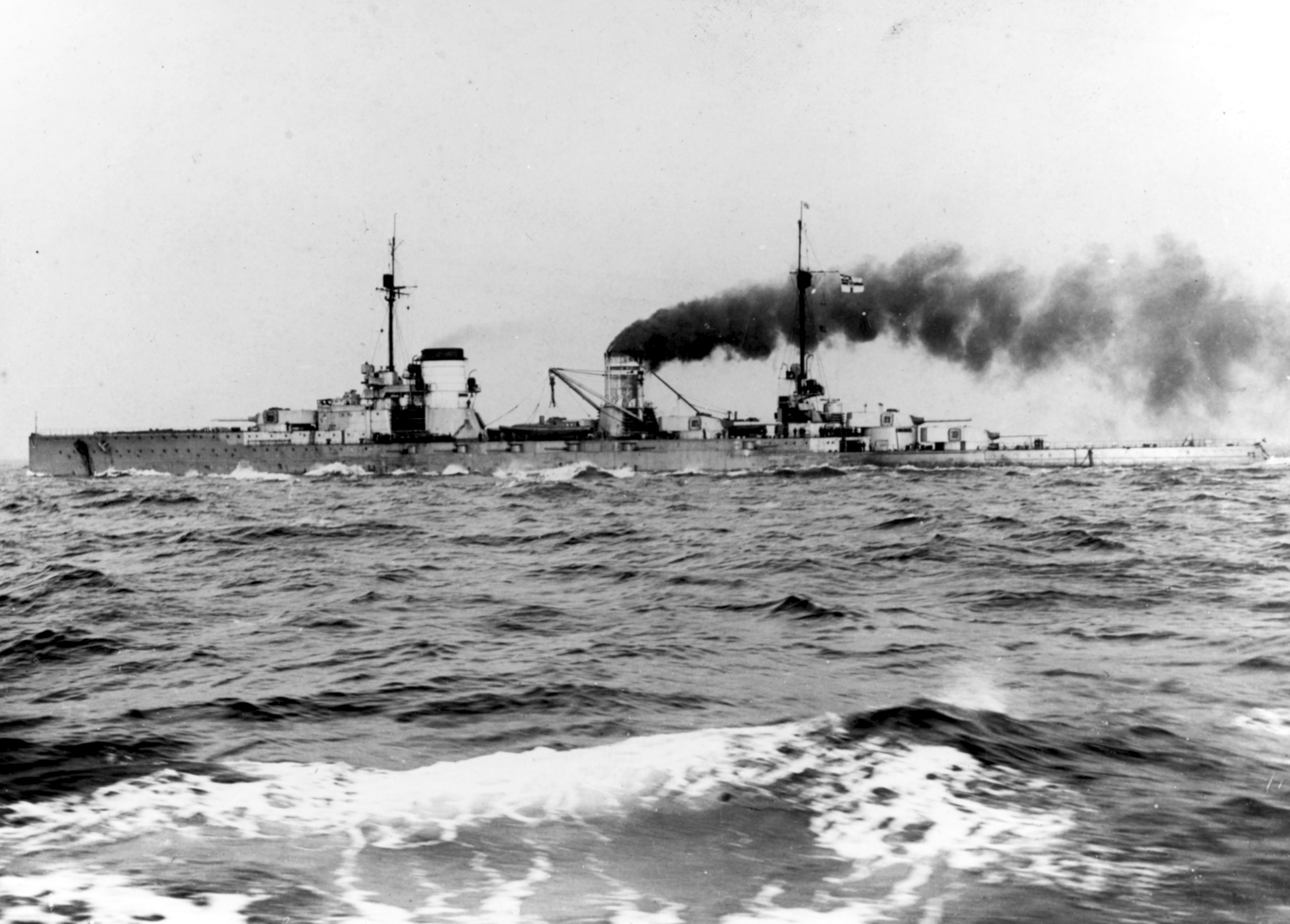
Seydlitz steaming to Scapa Flow

Seydlitz represented an incremental improvement over the Moltke class; the limited nature of the improvements was in large part dictated by the Reichstag (Imperial Diet), which rejected the possibility of any increase in cost for the next battlecruiser. Improvements to the Moltke design were secured only through pressure Tirpitz was able to place on steel suppliers and the ship's builder for discounts, which provided the necessary budgetary room to alter the design. Tirpitz still pressed for a British-style battlecruiser with light armor and larger guns, but his views were again rejected. Seydlitz was slightly larger than the two previous ships, carried slightly thicker belt armor, and had a taller forecastle to improve seakeeping in bad weather. Seydlitz mounted the same ten 28 cm guns as in the Moltke class in the same arrangement.

Upon commissioning into the fleet, Seydlitz became the flagship of Rear Admiral Franz von Hipper, the commander of I Scouting Group. The ship took part in most of the major fleet operations during the war. At the Battle of Dogger Bank, Seydlitz was hit in her after turrets by two or three 34.4 cm (13.5 in) shells from HMS Lion; the shells burned out the turrets and nearly destroyed the ship. By April 1916, she had been replaced as Hipper's flagship by the new battlecruiser Lützow. At Jutland, Seydlitz and Derfflinger inflicted fatal damage on the British battlecruiser HMS Queen Mary early in the action. Seydlitz was badly mauled in later parts of the battle, receiving 21 large-caliber hits, suffering more than 150 casualties, and taking in over 5,300 t (5,200 long tons; 5,800 short tons) of water. Despite the immense damage, Seydlitz was able to make the trip back to Wilhelmshaven, where she was repaired. As with Von der Tann and Moltke, Seydlitz was interned and eventually scuttled in Scapa Flow.

Summary of the Seydlitz class
Ship	Armament	Displacement	Propulsion	Service		
Ship	Armament	Displacement	Propulsion	Laid down	Commissioned	Fate
SMS Seydlitz	10 × 28 cm SK L/50 guns	28,550 t (28,100 long tons)	4 screws, Parsons steam turbines, 28.1 kn (52.0 km/h; 32.3 mph)	4 February 1911	22 May 1913	Scuttled at Scapa Flow on 21 June 1919, wreck raised 1928 and scrapped

=== Derfflinger class ===
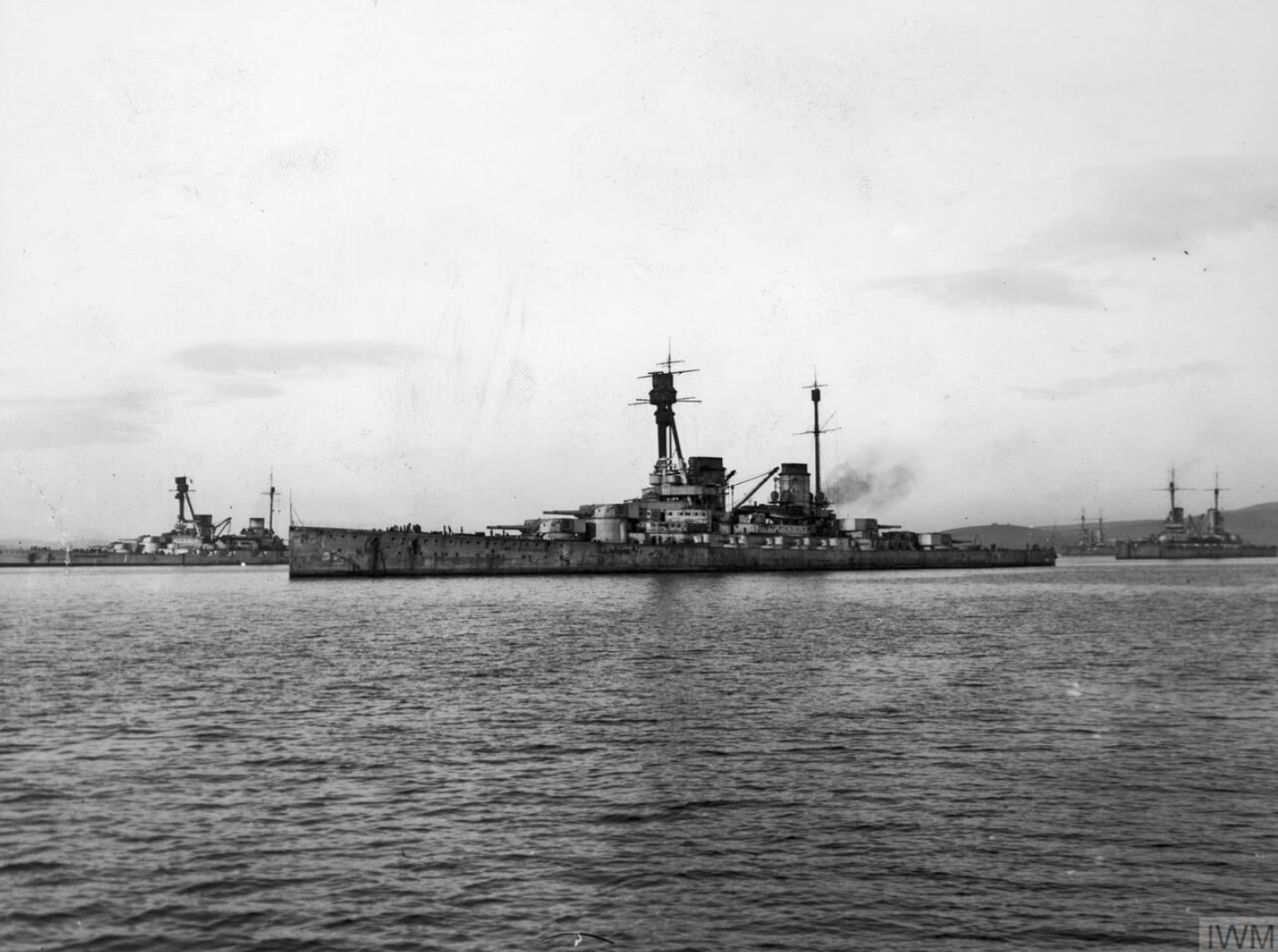
Hindenburg (center) and Derfflinger (left background) in Scapa Flow

The three Derfflinger-class ships were the last battlecruisers completed for the German navy. The ships' primary armament was radically modified compared to the older ships. The number of guns was reduced to eight, but their diameter was increased to 30.5 cm (12 in). They were also placed in two superfiring pairs, fore and aft of the main superstructure. The first unit, the name ship, was completed shortly after the outbreak of World War I. Lützow followed in August 1915, and Hindenburg joined the fleet in May 1917. Derfflinger was involved in most of the fleet actions during the war. At Jutland she fired on Queen Mary and contributed to her destruction, along with Seydlitz. Derfflinger and Lützow later concentrated their fire on Invincible and destroyed her. However, during the battle, Lützow was severely damaged by at least 24 heavy-caliber shells and was unable to make it back to Germany. She was scuttled early the following morning. Hindenburg's career was much less eventful; she was completed so late in the war that she saw no significant action against the British fleet. She and Derfflinger were interned and scuttled in Scapa Flow with the rest of the fleet.

Summary of the Derfflinger class
Ship	Armament	Displacement	Propulsion	Service		
Ship	Armament	Displacement	Propulsion	Laid down	Commissioned	Fate
SMS Derfflinger	8 × 30.5 cm (12 in) SK L/50 guns	31,200 t (30,700 long tons)	4 screws, Parsons steam turbines, 26.5 kn (49.1 km/h; 30.5 mph)	30 March 1912	1 September 1914	Scuttled in Scapa Flow on 21 June 1919, wreck raised 1939, broken up after 1946
SMS Lützow	8 × 30.5 cm (12 in) SK L/50 guns	31,200 t (30,700 long tons)	4 screws, Parsons steam turbines, 26.4 kn (48.9 km/h; 30.4 mph)	May 1912	8 August 1915	Scuttled after severe damage at the Battle of Jutland, 1 June 1916
SMS Hindenburg	8 × 30.5 cm (12 in) SK L/50 guns	31,500 t (31,000 long tons)	4 screws, Parsons steam turbines, 26.6 kn (49.3 km/h; 30.6 mph)	1 October 1913	10 May 1917	Scuttled in Scapa Flow on 21 June 1919, wreck raised 1930, scrapped 1930–1932

=== Mackensen class ===
Plan and profile drawing of the Macksensen design

Following the realization in February 1915 that the war would not be won quickly, the Navy department decided to replace the six armored cruisers that had been lost thus far. The ships were improved versions of the Derfflinger class; the primary alterations being the adoption of the 35 cm (13.8 in) gun for the main battery, along with a full-length forecastle deck. Four ships were ordered and laid down, but only two of them, Mackensen and Graf Spee, were launched. None of the ships were completed, as work had been diverted to U-boat construction. All four ships were broken up in Germany between 1921 and 1924.

Summary of the Mackensen class
Ship	Armament	Displacement	Propulsion	Service		
Ship	Armament	Displacement	Propulsion	Laid down	Commissioned	Fate
SMS Mackensen	8 × 35 cm (13.8 in) SK L/45 guns	35,300 t (34,700 long tons)	4 screws, Parsons steam turbines, 28 kn (52 km/h; 32 mph)	30 January 1915	—	Broken up, 1922
SMS Graf Spee	8 × 35 cm (13.8 in) SK L/45 guns	35,300 t (34,700 long tons)	4 screws, Parsons steam turbines, 28 kn (52 km/h; 32 mph)	30 November 1915	—	Broken up, 1921–1922
SMS Prinz Eitel Friedrich	8 × 35 cm (13.8 in) SK L/45 guns	35,300 t (34,700 long tons)	4 screws, Parsons steam turbines, 28 kn (52 km/h; 32 mph)	1915	—	Broken up, 1921
SMS Fürst Bismarck	8 × 35 cm (13.8 in) SK L/45 guns	35,300 t (34,700 long tons)	4 screws, Parsons steam turbines, 28 kn (52 km/h; 32 mph)	1915	—	Broken up, 1922

=== Ersatz Yorck class ===
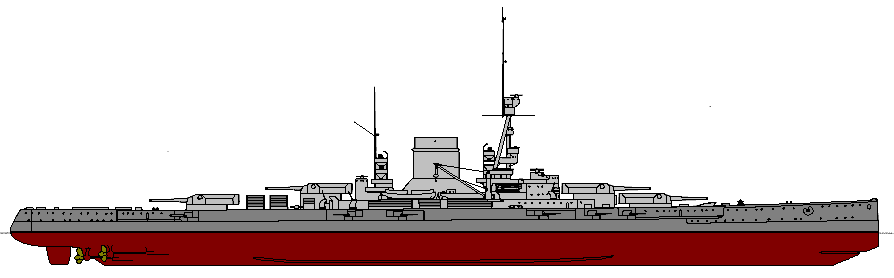
Line-drawing of Ersatz Yorck

The three ships of the Ersatz Yorck class were originally ordered as Mackensen-class ships, but the design was modified in January 1917 to increase the armament to eight 38 cm (15 in) guns. The Ersatz Yorcks were otherwise similar to the Mackensens, with the exception of the funnels. The Ersatz Yorck-class ships were modified to trunk the two smoke uptakes of the previous design into one large funnel. Only the lead ship was laid down, and work did not proceed far; only about 1,000 metric tons of steel had been assembled by the time work ceased. Work on the ship was only carried out to keep shipyard workers occupied. The other two ships were assigned to shipyards, but work never began.

Summary of the Ersatz Yorck class
Ship	Armament	Displacement	Propulsion	Service		
Ship	Armament	Displacement	Propulsion	Laid down	Commissioned	Fate
Ersatz Yorck	8 × 38 cm (15 in) SK L/45 guns	38,000 t (37,400 long tons)	4 screws, Parsons steam turbines, 27.3 kn (50.6 km/h; 31.4 mph)	July 1916	—	Broken up on the slipway
Ersatz Gneisenau	8 × 38 cm (15 in) SK L/45 guns	38,000 t (37,400 long tons)	4 screws, Parsons steam turbines, 27.3 kn (50.6 km/h; 31.4 mph)	—	—	
Ersatz Scharnhorst	8 × 38 cm (15 in) SK L/45 guns	38,000 t (37,400 long tons)	4 screws, Parsons steam turbines, 27.3 kn (50.6 km/h; 31.4 mph)	—	—	

== Kriegsmarine ==
=== O class ===
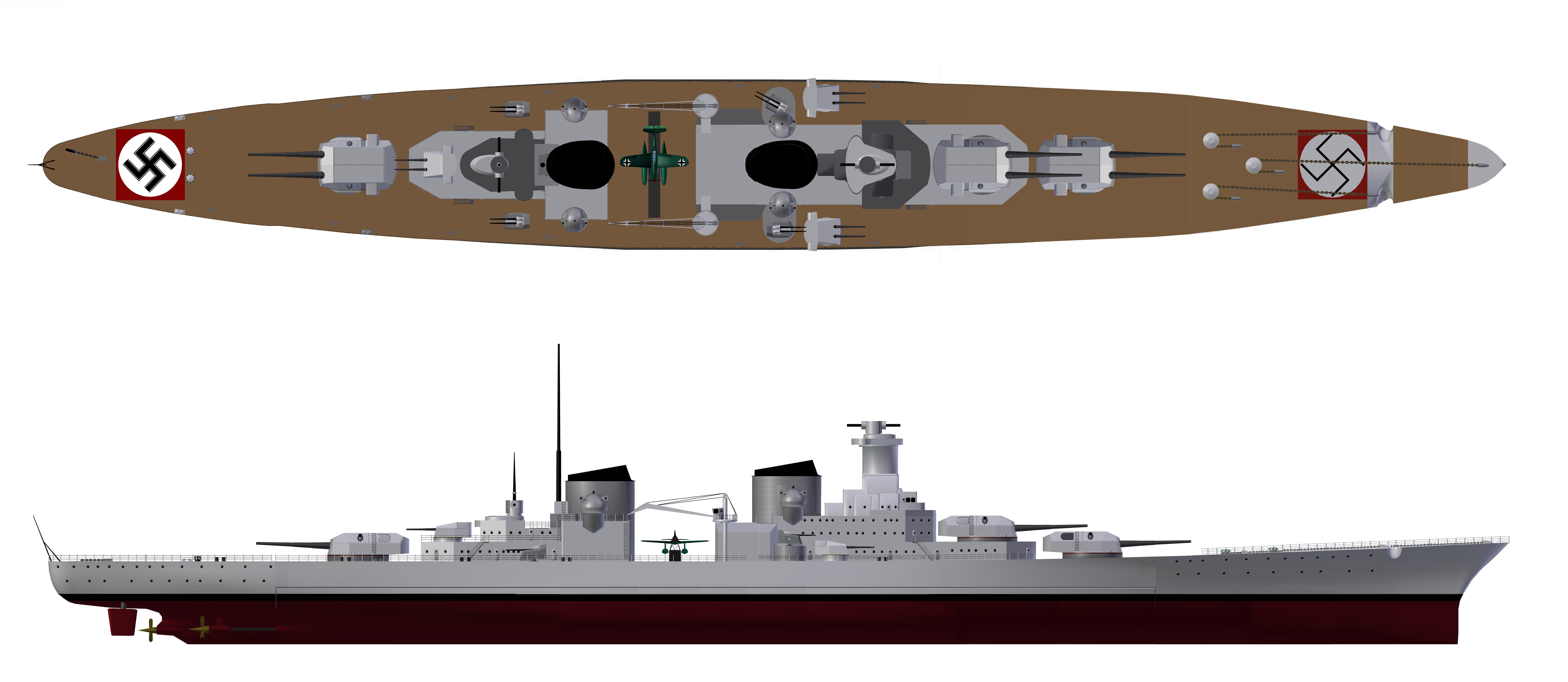
Line-drawing of the O class

The O-class battlecruisers were designed in 1937 to supplement the P-class cruisers then planned for the new German fleet. The three ships would have been armed with six 38 cm guns in three twin turrets, similar to the arrangement of the main battery of the Scharnhorst-class battleships. They were intended for use as long-range commerce raiders, with the goal of forcing Great Britain to disperse its battleships as convoy escorts. The ships were never laid down due to the outbreak of World War II in September 1939.

Summary of the O class
Ship	Armament	Displacement	Propulsion	Service		
Ship	Armament	Displacement	Propulsion	Laid down	Commissioned	Fate
O	6 × 38 cm SK C/34 guns	35,400 long tons (36,000 t) (Note: Figures here are reversed intentionally; following the signing of the Washington Naval Treaty in 1922, the use of long tons to calculate ship displacement was standardized.)	3 screws, 8 × diesel engines, 1 × steam turbine, 35 kn (65 km/h; 40 mph)	—	—	Canceled after the outbreak of World War II
P	6 × 38 cm SK C/34 guns	35,400 long tons (36,000 t)	3 screws, 8 × diesel engines, 1 × steam turbine, 35 kn (65 km/h; 40 mph)	—	—	Canceled after the outbreak of World War II
Q	6 × 38 cm SK C/34 guns	35,400 long tons (36,000 t)	3 screws, 8 × diesel engines, 1 × steam turbine, 35 kn (65 km/h; 40 mph)	—	—	Canceled after the outbreak of World War II
