= Adamasta Rock =

Undersea rock in Hong Kong

Adamasta Rock Beacon
- Location: Adamasta Rock, Hong Kong, Islands District, People's Republic of China
- Coordinates: 22°13′22″N 114°01′18″E

Adamasta Rock
- Traditional Chinese: 北長洲石
Transcriptions
Yue: Cantonese
- Yale Romanization: Bāk chèuhng jāu sehk
- Jyutping: Bak^{1} coeng^{4} zau^{1} sek^{6}

Adamasta Rock (Chinese: 北長洲石; lit. 'north Cheung Chau rock') is an uninhabited undersea rock in Hong Kong, in the centre of the busy Adamasta Channel between the Chi Ma Wan Peninsula of Lantau Island and Cheung Chau island, in Hong Kong. It falls within the Islands District.

The rock is underwater during high tide and poses a major shipping risk because of its position in the center of the Adamasta shipping route. The Hong Kong Marine Department has set up a permanent beacon (isolated danger) on the rock and placed two cardinal buoys on each side to alert vessels.

On Sunday, 8 May 2011, the river trader "Zhong Fu Fa Zhan" grounded on the rock.
