= NRP Adamastor =

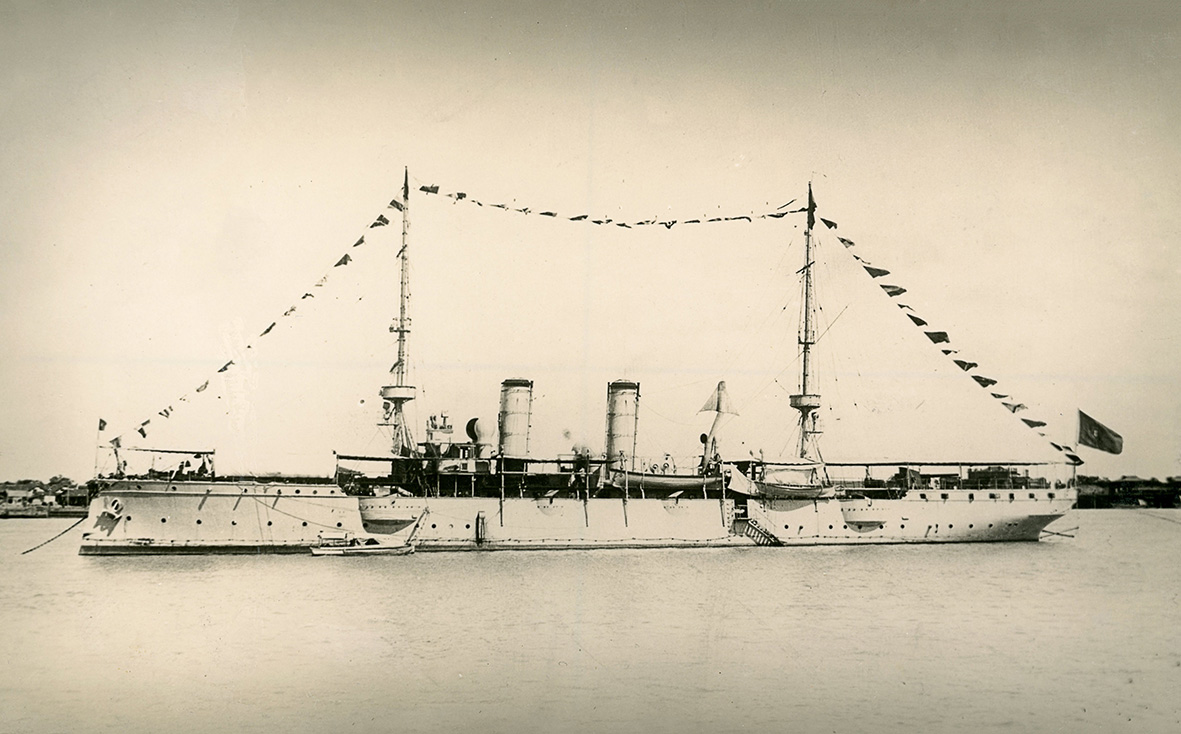
- Adamastor in Shangai, China in 1927

History

Portugal
- Name: Adamastor
- Namesake: Adamastor
- Builder: Orlando, Livorno
- Laid down: 1 January 1895
- Launched: 12 July 1896
- Commissioned: 3 August 1897
- Fate: Decommissioned in November 1933

General characteristics
- Type: Unprotected cruiser
- Displacement: 1,729 long tons (1,757 t)
- Length: 73.8 m (242 ft)
- Beam: 10.7 m (35 ft)
- Draft: 6.5 m (21 ft)
- Propulsion: 4 VTE cylindrical boilers
- Speed: 18 knots (33 km/h; 21 mph)
- Range: 4,600 nmi (8,500 km; 5,300 mi) at 10 knots (19 km/h; 12 mph)
- Complement: 237 officers and men
- Armament: 2 × 150 mm (6 in) Krupp guns; 4 × 105 mm (4 in) Krupp guns; 2 × 47 mm (2 in) Hotchkiss guns; 2 machine guns; 3 torpedo tubes
- Armor: Deck: 30 mm (1.2 in); Conning tower: 65 mm (2.6 in)

NRP Adamastor was a small unprotected cruiser of the Portuguese Navy that was launched in 1896 and remained active until being decommissioned in 1933, being the only ship of its class. The vessel played an important role in the 5 October 1910 revolution in the Kingdom of Portugal, which saw the fall of the monarchy, and later took part in actions in Portuguese Africa during World War I.

== Technical details ==
=== General characteristics ===
The cruiser was built in Livorno, Italy. The technical details of the ship were discussed in an 1898 issue of the supplement for the Scientific American magazine. It had a length of 73.8 meters (242 ft 2 in), beam height of 10.7 meters (35 ft 1 in), and depth of 6.5 meters (21 ft 4 in). The hull of Adamastor was made of steel and the lower decks had watertight compartments. Two electrical ventilators were provided to ventilate the ship in hot climates. The ship had a total crew of 237 officers and ratings. The quarterdeck included the captain's chambers, while the officer accommodations were located aft below the main deck. The top forecastle was occupied by the quarters of the petty officers and sailors.

=== Armament ===
Adamastor's armament included two 150 mm and four 105 mm Krupp naval guns on the main deck, along with two 47 mm Hotchkiss guns on the bridge, and Nordenfelt machine guns. The ship also possessed three torpedo tubes.

=== Propulsion ===
The ship was powered by either two or four cylindrical engines that were placed in separate watertight compartments and were rated at 4,000 horsepower (2,983 kW). Around 400 tons of coal were kept aboard Adamastor.

== Operational history ==
The ship had originally been built with money from public subscription in order to restore Portugal's honor after being humiliated by Great Britain in 1890, being prevented from making a land route from its two colonies of Angola and Mozambique. It was laid down in January 1895 and launched in July 1896, before being completed in August 1897.

In 1897 the ship was deployed to the Moroccan coast, along the with ironclad Vasco da Gama and Spanish ships, to hunt pirates. The Portuguese light cruiser ran aground on a rock in Hong Kong in 1906. The rock and the channel where the rock is located at later named after the cruiser as Adamasta Rock and Adamasta Channel. Around 1908 she visited Portuguese Timor and stopped in the Dutch East Indies.

When the 5 October 1910 revolution broke out in Lisbon, the Portuguese Navy would play an important role, in particular the crew of the Adamastor who rose up simultaneously as a revolt begin in the capital. Among the supporters of the revolution were the crew of three cruisers, including Adamastor, which helped to bomb the Necessidades Palace of the King of Portugal along with the cruiser São Rafael. Thus the cruiser would become a symbol of the revolution.

During World War I, Portugal took part in fighting against Paul von Lettow-Vorbeck's troops during the campaign in eastern Africa. In 1917, German forces entered Portuguese Mozambique. Although they defeated the Portuguese and British land forces, Adamastor and another cruiser were sent to the important port of Quelimane, at which point the Germans decided not to attack the city.

Adamastor ran aground in October 1929, but was refloated and returned to service before being decommissioned in 1933.

== Books ==
- Gardiner, Robert (1979). Conway's All the World's Fighting Ships 1860-1905. London: Conway Maritime Press. ISBN 0851771335.
- Love, Joseph (2012). The Revolt of the Whip. Stanford University Press. ISBN 978-0804781091.
- Scientific American: Supplement, Volume 45. Munn and Company. 1898.
