= Adamasta Channel =

Passage in Hong Kong

Coordinates: 22°13′22″N 114°1′18″E

- Traditional Chinese: 北長洲海峽
- Cantonese Yale: Bāk chèuhng jāu hói haahp
Transcriptions
Yue: Cantonese
- Yale Romanization: Bāk chèuhng jāu hói haahp
- Jyutping: Bak1 coeng4 zau1 hoi2 haap6

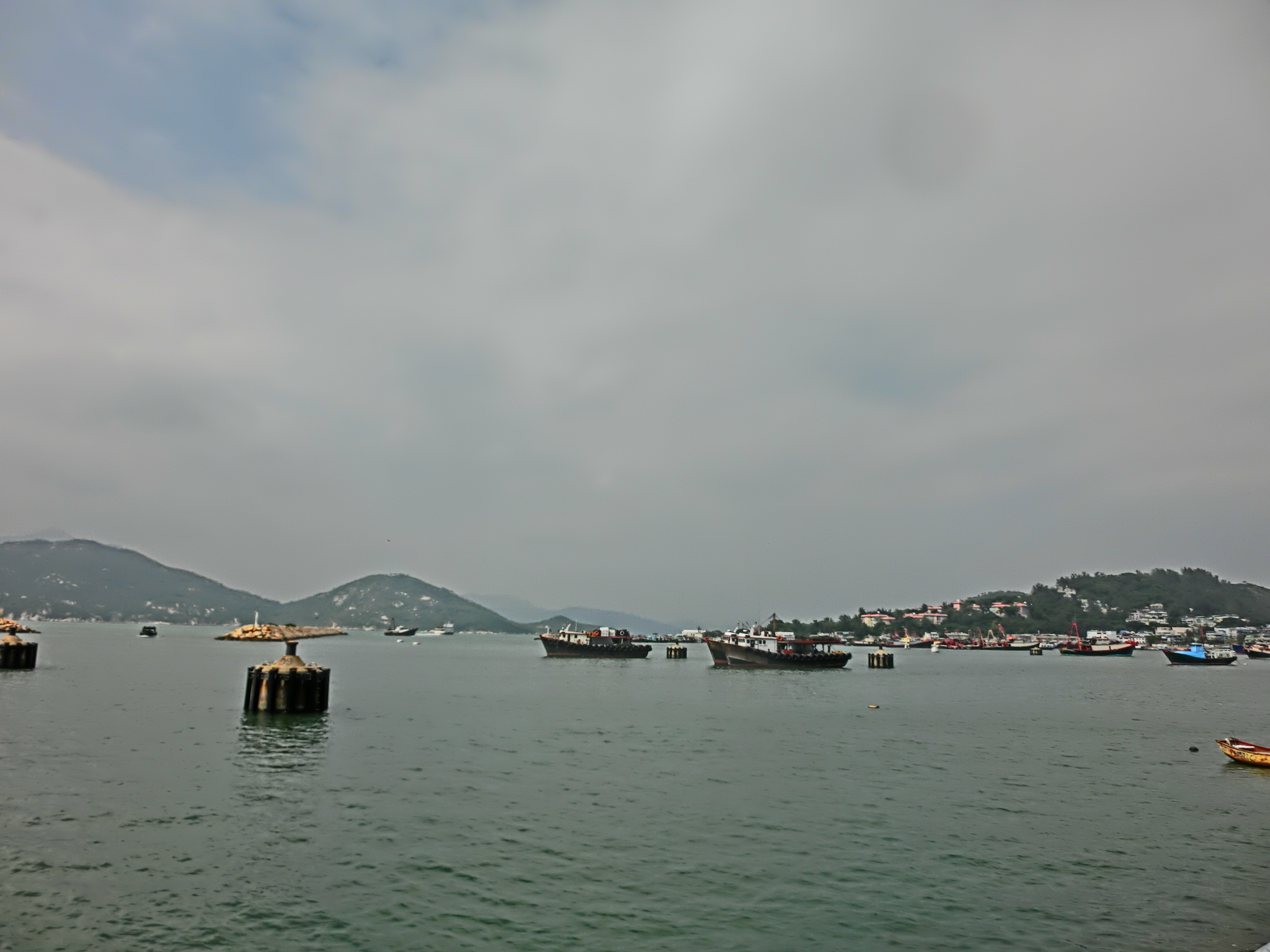
View of Adamasta Channel from Cheung Chau Typhoon Shelter. Lantau Island is on the left and Cheung Chau on the right.

The Adamasta Channel is a narrow passage between the Chi Ma Wan Peninsula of Lantau Island and Cheung Chau island in Hong Kong. It is one of the few passages in Hong Kong waters with a significant hazard, the Adamasta Rock, in the middle; however, the rock is well marked with a fixed light, and port- and starboard-hand buoys on either side. The name is likely a misspelling of Adamastor, the name of a Portuguese light cruiser which ran aground on the rock in 1906.

The channel experiences heavy traffic at all hours, being the principal route for the frequent fast ferry services between Hong Kong and Kowloon, and Macau, and also several outlying island ferry services.

== See also ==
- List of channels in Hong Kong
