= Argentine–Chilean naval arms race =

Naval armaments race in the late nineteenth century

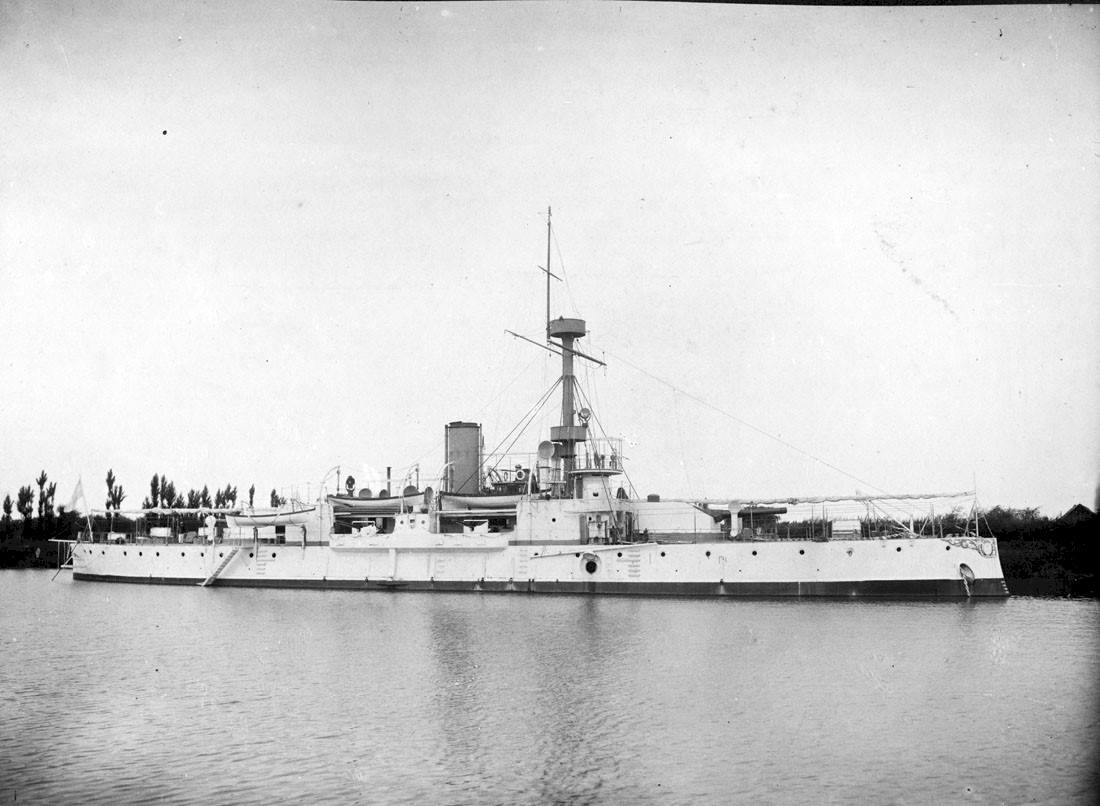
Libertad, seen here c. 1893, was laid down in 1890 as part of the developing naval arms race between Argentina and Chile

In the late nineteenth and early twentieth centuries, the South American nations of Argentina and Chile engaged in an expensive naval arms race to ensure the other would not gain supremacy in the Southern Cone.

Although the Argentine and Chilean navies were insignificant in the 1860s, with zero and five warships, respectively, Argentina's concern over a strong Imperial Brazilian Navy and the Chilean war against Spain caused them to add capable warships to their fleets in the 1870s. During this time, diplomatic relations between Argentina and Chile soured due to conflicting boundary claims, particularly in Patagonia. By the beginning of the 1880s, after the War of the Pacific, the Chilean government possessed possibly the strongest navy in the Americas. They planned to add to it with an 1887 appropriation for one battleship, two protected cruisers, and two torpedo gunboats. Argentina responded a year later with an order for two battleships of its own. The naval arms race unfolded over the next several years, with each country buying and ordering vessels that were slightly better than the previous ship, but the Argentines eventually pulled ahead with the acquisition of four Garibaldi-class cruisers.

The race ended in 1902 with the British-arbitrated Pacts of May, which contained a binding naval-limiting agreement. Both governments sold or canceled the ships they had ordered, and three major warships were mostly disarmed to balance the fleets. The pacts proved to be the answer to the Argentine and Chilean disputes, as the countries enjoyed a period of warm relations. This did not last, as the Brazilian government's attempt to rebuild its naval forces sparked another naval arms race, involving all three countries ordering revolutionary new dreadnoughts—powerful battleships whose capabilities far outstripped older vessels in the world's navies.

== Background ==
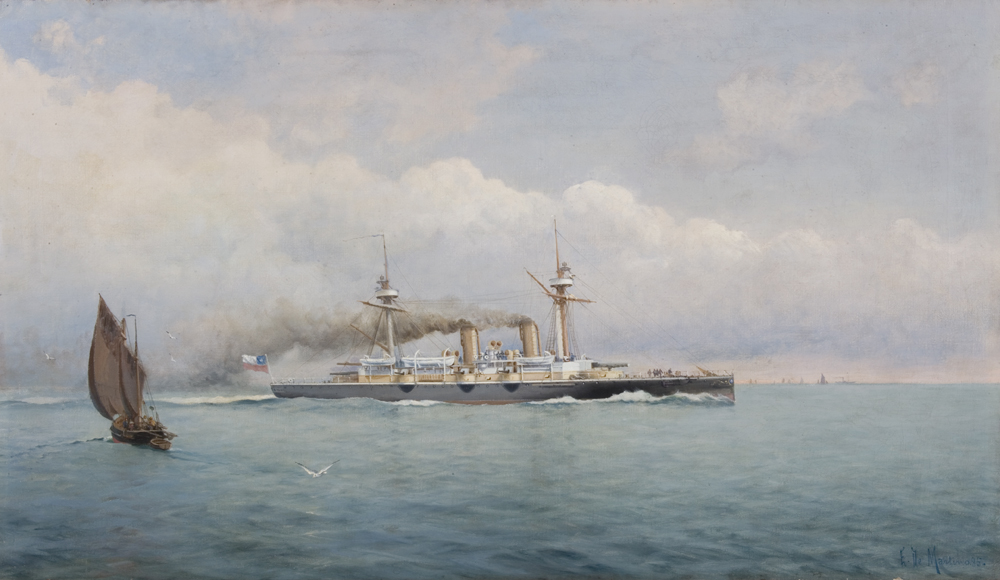
The protected cruiser Esmeralda, portrayed here by painter Edoardo de Martino, was purchased by the Chilean Navy in the 1880s to bolster its fleet

Conflicting Argentine and Chilean claims to Patagonia had been causing tension between the two countries since the 1840s. Lacking seaborne forces, neither could enforce its claim, though: in 1860, the Chileans had only five small vessels, while the Argentine Navy had no seagoing ships. These attitudes quickly changed when the circumstances warranted; when Chile joined Peru against Spain in the Chincha Islands War, the Spaniards bombarded and blockaded Valparaíso, leading the Chilean government to strengthen the navy. The Argentine government, under President Domingo Sarmiento, decided to build a navy in the 1870s to counter Brazilian naval acquisitions. Two large monitors, Los Andes and El Plata, were ordered from Laird Brothers, a British company, along with two gunboats. They were delivered in 1874 and 1875.

Patagonian tensions heightened in 1872 and 1878, when Chilean warships seized merchant ships which had been licensed to operate in the disputed area by the Argentine government. An Argentine warship did the same to a Chilean-licensed American ship in 1877. This action nearly led to war in November 1878, when the Argentines dispatched a squadron of warships to the Santa Cruz River. The Chilean Navy responded in kind, and war was only avoided by a hastily signed treaty.

Both countries were incapable of enforcing these claims with a seaborne force in the next few years, as the Argentines were occupied with internal military operations against the indigenous population (1870–84), and the Chileans involved in the War of the Pacific (Guerra del Pacífico, 1879–83) against Bolivia and Peru. Still, several warships were ordered by both nations: the Argentines commissioned a central battery ironclad, Almirante Brown, and a protected cruiser, Patagonia, in 1880 and 1885, respectively. For their part, the Chileans ordered a protected cruiser, Esmeralda, to bolster its fleet, which was centered on two central battery ironclads, Almirante Cochrane and Blanco Encalada. With these ships, the Chilean Navy emerged from the War of the Pacific as the preeminent navy in the Americas, surpassing even the navy of the United States, which had fallen into steep decline after the American Civil War. The Chilean government utilized this advantage when it deployed Esmeralda to Panama in 1885 to block the U.S. from attempting to annex the region.

== Arms race ==
Major Argentine and Chilean warship purchases and orders, 1887–1902
Year	Ships (type)	Year	Ships (type)
1887 (Chile)	Capitán Prat (BB); Presidente Errázuriz (PC); Presidente Pinto (PC)	1896 (Chile)	O'Higgins (AC)
1888 (Argentina)	Libertad (BB); Independencia (BB)	1896 (Argentina)	San Martín (AC)
1890 (Argentina)	Veinticinco de Mayo (PC)	1897 (Argentina)	Pueyrredón (AC)
1891 (Argentina)	Nueve de Julio (PC)	1898 (Argentina)	General Belgrano (AC)
1892 (Chile)	Blanco Encalada (PC)	1901 (Argentina)	Rivadavia (AC); Mariano Moreno (AC)
1894 (Argentina)	Buenos Aires (PC)	1901 (Chile)	Constitución (BB); Libertad (BB)
1895 (Chile)	Esmeralda (AC); Ministro Zenteno (PC)	1901 (Argentina)	Two battleships, possibly ordered
1895 (Argentina)	Garibaldi (AC)	1901 (Chile)	Chacabuco (PC)
BB: pre-dreadnought battleship; AC: armored cruiser; PC: protected cruiser
Statistics compiled from Scheina, Naval History, 46–51, 297–299.

The Chilean government moved first to begin the naval arms race when it ordered a modern ironclad battleship, Capitán Prat, two protected cruisers, and two torpedo boats from France and the United Kingdom. Bought with a £3,129,500 appropriation in the 1887 budget, the ships would have upset the balance of naval power in Latin America—while the Argentines had more vessels, the Chileans had larger warships with far more experienced crewmen. This purchase was made worse, from the Argentine perspective, by a large order for rifles, field guns, sabers, and carbines, enough to arm an 80,000-strong army. The Argentine government responded with two battleships—Independencia and Libertad, though they were individually smaller than their Chilean counterpart—and two protected cruisers, one purchased on the stocks in 1890 (Veinticinco de Mayo) and a new-build of the same design in 1891 (Nueve de Julio). The purchases were funded largely through export-related windfall, Chile through nitrates and Argentina through grain and cattle.

The Chilean Civil War (1891), rather than calming the naval ambitions of Chile, escalated them. In that conflict, the Chilean Navy played a significant role on the congressional side against the president and the army. The resulting victory of the congressional side and subsequent presidency of Admiral Jorge Montt led to a large increase in prestige and consequent funding for the navy. Argentine naval units assisted failed revolts in Argentina, but the continuing acrimony with and naval acquisitions of Chile meant this had little effect.

The Chilean government purchased a protected cruiser, Blanco Encalada, on the stocks in 1892, while the Argentines purchased one, Buenos Aires, being built speculatively in late 1893. The Chileans sold their oldest protected cruiser, Esmeralda, in late 1894 to finance the order of an armored cruiser. This materialized in May 1895 with a new Esmeralda, along with four torpedo boats; a Brazilian protected cruiser, Ministro Zenteno, was purchased while under construction in August 1895. The Argentines purchased an Italian armored cruiser, Garibaldi, on the stocks on 14 July 1895. (Note: Being 'purchased on the stocks' or 'off the stocks' in nautical terminology means that the ship was built on speculation and was purchased while under construction.)

In April 1896, Chile ordered another armored cruiser, O'Higgins, and six torpedo boats. Naval historian Robert Scheina states that in the same month Argentina ordered San Martín, a near-sister ship to Garibaldi which was under construction in Italy, but notes that the small time lapse between the orders makes it difficult or impossible to know who was responding to who—or if either were simply independent acquisitions. As historian Jonathan Grant writes, the Argentines may have moved first to secure a definite, if momentarily tenuous, advantage over the Chilean Navy. In May 1898, the Chilean government found that the Argentines were planning on acquiring one, then two, Garibaldi-class cruisers (Pueyrredón and General Belgrano). With tensions extremely high and war seemingly imminent, the two countries agreed to submit their boundary disputes to the British. They also signed pacts which led to the resolution of the Puna de Atacama dispute. As the former arbitration took much time, leaving that particular boundary dispute unresolved, the naval arms race quickly picked back up.

The Argentines ordered two additional armored cruisers that were similar to the previous four, but more powerful. To counter them, the Chilean government ordered two new battleships, Constitución and Libertad, using part of its gold reserve to pay for them. These battleships' fast speed would make them suitable for opposing the new Argentine armored cruisers. The Chileans also purchased the protected cruiser Chacabuco, which had been built on speculation, on the stocks in late 1901. The Argentines responded in May 1901 with an inquiry, possibly a full order, to Ansaldo for a new 15,000-long-ton (15,000 t) battleship design. This would mount a 305 mm (12 in) main battery and be capable of steaming at 20 knots (23 mph; 37 km/h).

The increased tensions and near state of war between Argentina and Chile caused the British to push for a resolution, lest their economic interests in the region, which included the export of British goods and the import of Latin American raw materials, be disrupted. Talks were held in the Chilean capital, Santiago, between the British ambassador to Chile, the Argentine ambassador to Chile, and the Chilean foreign minister and President Germán Riesco. This led to the three Pacts of May on 28 May 1902, which ended the dispute. The third limited the naval armaments of both countries. Argentina and Chile were barred from acquiring any further warships for five years, unless they gave the other eighteen months of advance notice. The warships under construction were sold to the United Kingdom, with Chile's battleships becoming the Swiftsure class, and Japan, with Argentina's final two armored cruisers becoming the Kasuga class. The two planned Argentine battleships were either never ordered or canceled, and Garibaldi and Pueyrredón, along with Chile's Capitán Prat, were disarmed with the exception of their main batteries, as the Argentine Navy had no crane capable of removing the armored cruiser's gun turrets.

== Aftermath ==
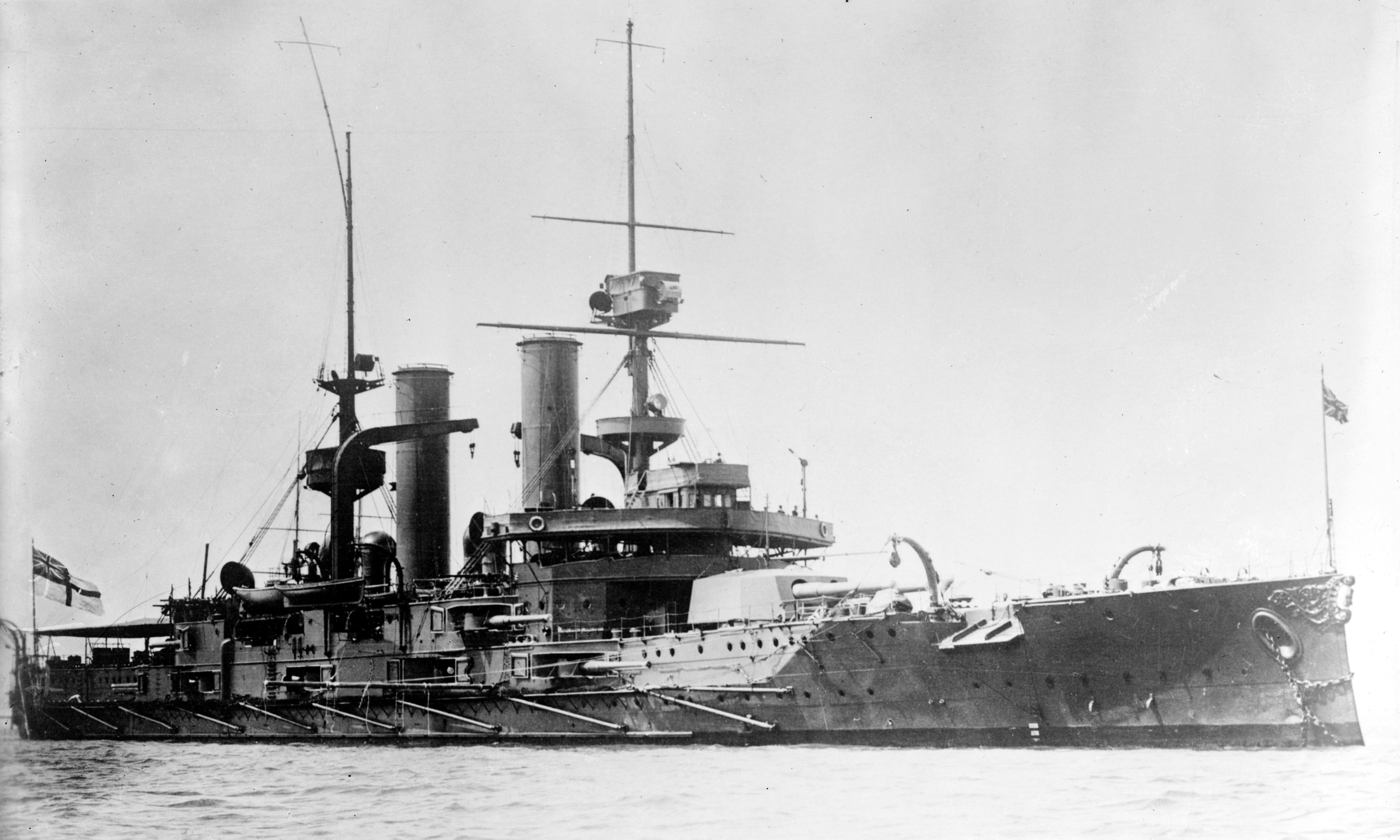
HMS Triumph, a Swiftsure-class battleship, was originally ordered by the Chilean government, but was sold to the United Kingdom due to the successful Pacts of May.

The Argentine–Chilean naval arms race was extremely expensive for both countries. The Argentine government was able to purchase £4,534,800 worth of ships between 1890 and 1898 with large foreign loans, which were given to them despite the country's role in the Baring crisis of 1890. The government's total foreign debt reached 421 million gold pesos by 1896. As for Chile, it was forced to take out a £2 million loan in order to purchase Krupp weaponry, and this combined with its other loans led the banking industry to suspend loans to Chile until the diplomatic crisis with Argentina was solved. Both the Argentine President Julio Argentino Roca and American ambassador to Argentina William Paine Lord ascribed the ending of the arms race to the diminished credit of Argentina and Chile.

By all measures, the Pacts of May were an unmitigated success. Both Argentina and Chile enjoyed a period of lessened tensions, leaving the near state of war they were in, and the pacts ended their expensive naval buildups. However, the third major country in South America, Brazil, brought this to a crashing halt in 1904, when its congress passed a large naval construction plan. This culminated in 1907 with a Brazilian order for three "dreadnoughts", a new form of warship whose advanced armament and propulsion capabilities far outstripped older vessels in the world's navies. Two would be laid down immediately, with a third to follow. The Argentine and Chilean governments quickly moved to cancel the remaining months of the naval-limiting Pacts of May, and both eventually responded with orders for their own dreadnoughts.

== See also ==
- East Patagonia, Tierra del Fuego and Strait of Magellan Dispute
- Maximum neighbor hypothesis
- Anglo-German naval arms race
- Austro-Italian ironclad arms race
