= HMS Colne =

Destroyer of the Royal Navy

History

United Kingdom
- Name: HMS Colne
- Ordered: 1903–1904 Naval Estimates
- Builder: John I. Thornycroft & Company Chiswick
- Laid down: 21 March 1904
- Launched: 21 May 1905
- Commissioned: July 1905
- Out of service: 1919 laid up in reserve awaiting disposal
- Honours and awards: Dardanelles 1915–1916
- Fate: 4 November 1919 sold to J.H. Lee for breaking at Dover

General characteristics
- Class & type: Thornycroft Type River class destroyer
- Displacement: 550 long tons (559 t) standard; 615 long tons (625 t) full load; 225 ft 9 in (68.81 m) o/a; 23 ft 10.5 in (7.277 m) Beam; 8 ft (2.4 m) Draught
- Propulsion: 4 × Thornycroft water tube boiler; 2 × Vertical Triple Expansion (VTE) steam engines driving 2 shafts producing 7,000 shp (5,200 kW) (average)
- Speed: 25.5 kn (47.2 km/h)
- Range: 127 tons coal; 1,695 nmi (3,139 km) at 11 kn (20 km/h)
- Complement: 70 officers and men
- Armament: 1 × QF 12-pounder 12 cwt Mark I, mounting P Mark I; 3 × QF 12-pounder 8 cwt, mounting G Mark I (Added in 1906); 5 × QF 6-pounder 8 cwt (removed in 1906); 2 × single tubes for 18-inch (450mm) torpedoes

Service record
- Part of: East Coast Destroyer Flotilla (1904); China Station (1909/10); 5th Destroyer Flotilla (December 1914)
- Operations: World War I

HMS Colne was a Thornycroft Type River class destroyer ordered by the Royal Navy under the 1903–1904 Naval Estimates. Named after the River Colne in eastern England, north east of London, she was the first ship to carry this name in the Royal Navy.

== Construction ==
She was laid down on 21 March 1904 at the John I. Thornycroft & Company shipyard at Chiswick and launched on 21 May 1905. She was completed in July 1905. Her original armament was to be the same as the Turleback torpedo boat destroyers that preceded her. In 1906 the Admiralty decided to upgrade the armament by landing the five 6-pounder naval guns and shipping three 12-pounder 8 hundredweight (cwt) guns. Two would be mounted abeam at the fo'c's'le break and the third gun would be mounted on the quarterdeck.

== Pre-War ==
After commissioning she was assigned to the East Coast Destroyer Flotilla of the 1st Fleet and based at Harwich.

On 11 April 1907, Colne and the destroyer Falcon collided in the Channel, badly damaging both ships.

On 27 April 1908 the Eastern Flotilla departed Harwich for live fire and night manoeuvres. During these exercises HMS Attentive rammed and sank HMS Gala, then damaged HMS Ribble.

In 1909–1910 she was assigned to China Station.

On 30 August 1912 the Admiralty directed all destroyer classes were to be designated by alpha characters starting with the letter 'A'. The ships of the River class were assigned to the E class. After 30 September 1913, she was known as an E class destroyer and had the letter 'E' painted on the hull below the bridge area and on either the fore or aft funnel.

== First World War ==
In July 1914 she was on China Station based at Hong Kong tendered to HMS Triumph. She deployed with China Squadron to Tsingtao to blockade the German base. On 24 November 1914, after the Japanese declaration of war she returned to Hong Kong. With the fall of Tsingtao and the sinking of the SMS Emden, she was redeployed to the 5th Destroyer Flotilla in the Mediterranean Fleet in November 1914 accompanying HMS Triumph, to support the Dardanelles campaign.

On 3 March while inshore shelling a battery near Erenkeui, she was taken under fire by HMS Amethyst. HMS Wolverine informed the cruiser she was firing on Colne and she ceased fire. HMS Colne was not hit and suffered no casualties during this friendly fire incident.

On 18 March 1915 she in conjunction with HMS Jed and HMS Chelmer assisted with the rescue of the crew of the battleship HMS Ocean after she struck a mine in the Dardanelles.

On 25 April 1915 under the command of Commander C. Seymour, she supported the landings at ANZAC Cove.

On 25 May 1915 she provided fire support for ground forces during their capture of some Turkish outpost trenches.

== Disposition ==
In 1919 she returned to Home waters, was paid off and laid up in reserve awaiting disposal. On 4 November 1919 she was sold to J.H. Lee for breaking at Dover.

She was awarded the Battle Honour "Dardanelles 1915–1916" for her service.

== Pennant Numbers ==
It is not known if she was assigned a pennant number as no record has been found.

== Bibliography ==
- Chesneau, Roger & Kolesnik, Eugene M., eds. (1979). Conway's All The World's Fighting Ships 1860–1905. London: Conway Maritime Press. ISBN 0-85177-133-5.
- Colledge, J. J.; Warlow, Ben (2006) [1969]. Ships of the Royal Navy: The Complete Record of All Fighting Ships of the Royal Navy from the 15th Century to the Present (3rd Rev ed.). London: Chatham Publishing. ISBN 978-1-86176-281-8. OCLC 67375475.
- Dittmar, F.J.; Colledge, J. J. (1972). British Warships 1914–1919. Shepperton, UK: Ian Allan. ISBN 0-7110-0380-7.
- Friedman, Norman (2009). British Destroyers: From Earliest Days to the Second World War. Barnsley, UK: Seaforth Publishing. ISBN 978-1-84832-049-9.
- Gardiner, Robert & Gray, Randal, eds. (1985). Conway's All The World's Fighting Ships 1906–1921. London: Conway Maritime Press. ISBN 0-85177-245-5.
- Manning, T. D. (1961). The British Destroyer. London: Putnam & Co. OCLC 6470051.
- March, Edgar J. (1966). British Destroyers: A History of Development, 1892–1953; Drawn by Admiralty Permission From Official Records & Returns, Ships' Covers & Building Plans. London: Seeley Service. OCLC 164893555.
