= HMS Jed (1904) =

Destroyer of the Royal Navy

History

United Kingdom
- Name: HMS Jed
- Ordered: 1903 – 1904 Naval Estimates
- Builder: John I. Thornycroft & Company
- Laid down: 27 February 1903
- Launched: 16 February 1904
- Commissioned: 10 January 1905
- Out of service: 1919 laid up in reserve awaiting disposal
- Honours and awards: Dardanelles 1915 - 1916
- Fate: 29 July 1920 sold for demolition

General characteristics
- Class & type: Thornycroft Type River Class destroyer
- Displacement: 550 long tons (559 t) standard; 615 long tons (625 t) full load; 225 ft 9 in (68.81 m) o/a; 23 ft 10.5 in (7.277 m) Beam; 8 ft (2.4 m) Draught
- Propulsion: 4 × Thornycroft water tube boiler; 2 × Vertical Triple Expansion (VTE) steam engines driving 2 shafts producing 7,000 shp (5,200 kW) (average)
- Speed: 25.5 kn (47.2 km/h)
- Range: 127 tons coal; 1,695 nmi (3,139 km) at 11 kn (20 km/h)
- Complement: 70 officers and men
- Armament: 1 × QF 12-pounder 12 cwt Mark I, mounting P Mark I; 3 × QF 12-pounder 8 cwt, mounting G Mark I (Added in 1906); 5 × QF 6-pounder 8 cwt (removed in 1906); 2 × single tubes for 18-inch (450mm) torpedoes

Service record
- Part of: East Coast Destroyer Flotilla - 1904; China Station – 1909/10; 5th Destroyer Flotilla – Dec 1914
- Operations: First World War 1914 - 1918

HMS Jed was a Thornycroft type River-class destroyer ordered by the Royal Navy under the 1903 – 1904 Naval Estimates. Named after the River Jed in southern Scotland, she was the second ship to carry this name since it was introduced in 1814 for a 26-gun sixth rate ship sold in 1833.

== Construction ==
She was laid down on 27 February 1903 at the Thornycroft shipyard at Chiswick and launched on 13 February 1904. She was completed on 10 January 1905. Her original armament was to be the same as the Turleback torpedo boat destroyers that preceded her. In 1906 the Admiralty decided to upgrade the armament by landing the five 6-pounder naval guns and shipping three 12-pounder 8 hundredweight (cwt) guns. Two would be mounted abeam at the foc's'le break and the third gun would be mounted on the quarterdeck.

== Pre-War ==
After commissioning she was assigned to the East Coast Destroyer Flotilla of the 1st Fleet and based at Harwich.

On 27 April 1908 the Eastern Flotilla departed Harwich for live fire and night manoeuvres. During these exercises HMS Attentive rammed and sank HMS Gala then damaged HMS Ribble.

In 1909/1910 she was assigned to the China Station.

On 30 August 1912 the Admiralty directed all destroyer classes were to be designated by alpha characters starting with the letter 'A'. The ships of the River Class were assigned to the E Class. After 30 September 1913, she was known as an E Class destroyer and had the letter ‘E’ painted on the hull below the bridge area and on either the fore or aft funnel.

== First World War ==
In July 1914, she was on the China Station, based at Hong Kong, tendered to HMS Triumph. She deployed with the China Squadron to Qingdao to blockade the German base. On 24 November 1914, after the Japanese declaration of war, she returned to Hong Kong. With the fall of Qingdao and the sinking of the SMS Emden, she was redeployed to the 5th Destroyer Flotilla in the Mediterranean Fleet in November 1914, accompanying HMS Triumph, to support the Dardanelles campaign.

On 18 March 1915, in conjunction with HMS Chelmer and HMS Colne, she assisted with the rescue of the crew of the battleship HMS Ocean after she struck a mine in the Dardanelles.

She arrived at Skyros on 14 April 1915 with HMS Wear and HMS Kennet. Upon the arrival of the transports on 16 April, the three ships pursued the Turkish torpedo boat Demir Hissar, which was attacking the transport SS Manitou at Tribouki. The Turkish torpedo boat was driven ashore and destroyed. They shared the prize monies awarded.

On 25 April 1915, she supported the landings at ANZAC Cove as part of the 3rd Division’s feint attack on Bulair.

In May 1915, she was stationed in the Gulf of Xeros to act as a wireless relay for submarines operating in the Dardanelles, principally HMS E11.

December 1915 found her on the Smyrna Patrol, enforcing the blockade of the Turkish coast from Cape Kaba to latitude 38^{o}30’E, 200 nautical miles including Smyrna. At this time, she was based at Port Iero on the island of Mytelene.

From 1 to 7 January 1916, she participated in the roundup of enemy agents in Mytelene.

She remained in the Mediterranean until the end of the war.

== Disposition ==
In 1919 she returned to Home waters, was paid off and laid up in reserve awaiting disposal. On 29 July 1920, Jed was sold to J. & W. Purves, and arrived at Teignmouth, Devon, for breaking up by the Channel Shipbreaking Company on 7 January 1921. Her hull was reused as an embankment at Dartmouth.

She was awarded the Battle Honour Dardanelles 1915 - 1916 for her service.

== Pennant Numbers ==
It is not known if she was assigned a pennant number as no record has been found.

== Bibliography ==
- Chesneau, Roger & Kolesnik, Eugene M., eds. (1979). Conway's All The World's Fighting Ships 1860–1905. London: Conway Maritime Press. ISBN 0-85177-133-5.
- Colledge, J. J.; Warlow, Ben (2006) [1969]. Ships of the Royal Navy: The Complete Record of All Fighting Ships of the Royal Navy from the 15th Century to the Present (3rd Rev ed.). London: Chatham Publishing. ISBN 978-1-86176-281-8. OCLC 67375475.
- Dittmar, F.J.; Colledge, J. J. (1972). British Warships 1914–1919. Shepperton, UK: Ian Allan. ISBN 0-7110-0380-7.
- Friedman, Norman (2009). British Destroyers: From Earliest Days to the Second World War. Barnsley, UK: Seaforth Publishing. ISBN 978-1-84832-049-9.
- Gardiner, Robert & Gray, Randal, eds. (1985). Conway's All The World's Fighting Ships 1906–1921. London: Conway Maritime Press. ISBN 0-85177-245-5.
- Manning, T. D. (1961). The British Destroyer. London: Putnam & Co. OCLC 6470051.
- March, Edgar J. (1966). British Destroyers: A History of Development, 1892–1953; Drawn by Admiralty Permission From Official Records & Returns, Ships' Covers & Building Plans. London: Seeley Service. OCLC 164893555.
