= Chilean battleship Capitán Prat =

Chilean ironclad battleship

- Illustration of Capitán Prat in 1893

History

Chile
- Name: Capitán Prat
- Namesake: Captain Arturo Prat
- Operator: Chilean Navy
- Ordered: 18 April 1889
- Builder: Forges et Chantiers de la Méditerranée
- Laid down: 1889
- Launched: 20 December 1890
- Acquired: May 1893
- Commissioned: 1891
- Fate: Sold for scrap in 1942

General characteristics
- Type: Ironclad battleship
- Displacement: 6,901 t (6,792 long tons; 7,607 short tons)
- Length: 328 ft (100 m)
- Beam: 60 ft 8 in (18.49 m)
- Draft: 22 ft 10 in (6.96 m)
- Installed power: 5 boilers; 12,000 ihp (8,900 kW)
- Propulsion: 2 × marine steam engines; 2 × screw propellers
- Speed: 18.3 kn (33.9 km/h; 21.1 mph)
- Complement: 480
- Armament: 4 × 9.4 in (240 mm) guns; 8 × 4.7 in (120 mm) guns; 6 × 6-pounder guns; 4 × 3-pounder guns; 10 × 1-pounder guns; 4 × 18 in (460 mm) torpedo tubes
- Armor: Belt: 11.8 in (300 mm); Deck: 2 to 3.1 in (51 to 79 mm); Conning tower: 10.5 in (270 mm); Barbettes: 10.8 in (270 mm)

Capitán Prat was a unique ironclad battleship of the Chilean Navy built in the late 1880s and completed in 1890. Armed with a main battery of four 9.4 in (240 mm) guns in four single turrets, Capitán Prat was the first battleship in the world to be equipped with an electrical system. She was built in the La Seyne dockyard in France, and commissioned into the Chilean fleet in 1891. Foreign navies tried to purchase the ship twice before the outbreak of wars, including an American attempt in 1898 and a Japanese offer in 1903.

Capitán Prat served in the fleet for about ten years, until she was disarmed in accordance with a treaty signed with Argentina intended to stop a naval arms race between the two countries. The ship returned to service, however, and remained on active duty with the fleet until 1926, when she was reduced to a coastal defense ship. In 1928–1930, she was used as a submarine tender, and in 1935, she was disarmed and used as a training ship for engineers. She remained in the Navy's inventory until 1942, when she was sold for scrap.

== Design ==
Capitán Prat was designed by Amable Lagane, the director of naval construction at the Forges et Chantiers de la Méditerranée shipyard in La Seyne-sur-Mer, France. The design for the ship influenced Lagane's next project, the pre-dreadnought battleship Jauréguiberry, specifically the use of twin-gun turrets for the ship's secondary battery.

=== General characteristics and machinery ===
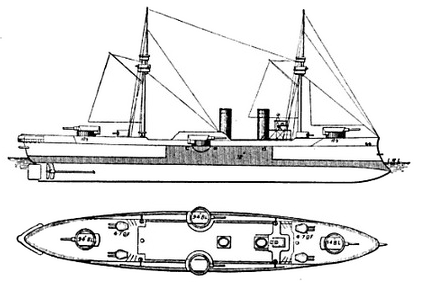
Line-drawing showing the disposition of the armament and the extent of the armored belt

Capitán Prat was 328 feet (100 m) long between perpendiculars and had a beam of 60 ft 8 in (18.49 m). She displaced 6,901 metric tons (6,792 long tons; 7,607 short tons) and had a draft of 22 ft 10 in (6.96 m). Her hull was steel-built, with wood and copper sheathing to protect it from biofouling during lengthy periods between cleaning. She was equipped with a ram bow. She was flush-decked and had a high freeboard. Her superstructure was minimal, consisting primarily of a small conning tower forward. The ship mounted two masts, both with fighting tops. She had a crew of 480 officers and enlisted men.

She was powered by a pair of horizontal-expansion marine steam engines that each drove a screw propeller. Steam was supplied by five cylindrical, coal-fired boilers. The boilers were trunked into two funnels; these were placed on the centerline, aft of the conning tower. Her propulsion system was rated at 12,000 indicated horsepower (8,900 kW) for a top speed of 18.3 knots (33.9 km/h; 21.1 mph). She was designed to carry 400 t (390 long tons; 440 short tons) of coal, though she could carry up to 1,100 t (1,100 long tons; 1,200 short tons). She was the first battleship of any navy to utilize electricity to power machinery.

=== Armament and armor ===
The ship was armed with a main battery of four 9.4 in (240 mm)/35 caliber Canet guns in single, electrically powered turrets. One was placed forward, on the centerline, two were mounted amidships, and the fourth was located aft of the superstructure on the centerline. Her secondary battery consisted of eight 4.7 in (120 mm) guns in four twin turrets; they were mounted on either side of the foremast and mainmast. Close-range defense against torpedo boats was provided by a battery of six 6-pounder guns, four 3-pounder guns, and ten 1-pounder guns. She was also armed with four 18 in (460 mm) torpedo tubes in deck-mounted launchers. One was in the bow, another in the stern, and two on the broadside.

The ship's armor consisted of Creusot steel. Her armored belt was 11.8 in (300 mm) thick amidships above the waterline, and 7.8 in (200 mm) below. Above the waterline, the belt was reduced to 4.9 in (120 mm) forward and 5.9 in (150 mm) aft. The belt was 3.9 in (99 mm) below the waterline, on either end of the ship. The belt extended for 2 ft 4 in (0.71 m) above the waterline and 4 ft 7 in (1.40 m) below. The citadel was 3.1 in (79 mm) thick and protected the ship's machinery spaces amidships. It extended to the upper deck and was closed on either ends by bulkheads 3.1 in (79 mm) thick. Outside the citadel, the deck was protected by 2 in (51 mm) thick armor. The barbettes for the main battery guns were 8 to 10.8 in (200 to 270 mm) thick, with 2 in (51 mm) thick hoods to protect the gun crews. The conning tower had 10.5 in (270 mm) thick sides.

== Service history ==
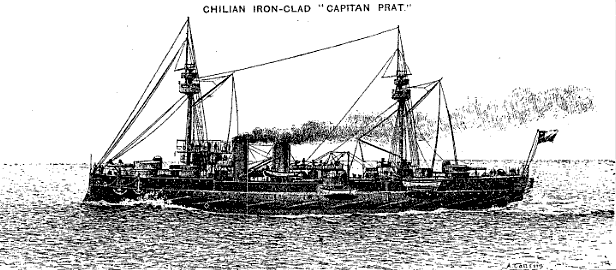
Illustration of Capitán Prat in 1893

On 22 August 1887, the National Congress of Chile passed a law authorizing the construction of new vessels to modernize the fleet. As part of this, they decided to order a new battleship—the largest ship ever constructed for the Chilean Navy—from a foreign shipyard. The contract for constructing the new Chilean battleship was advertised throughout the European shipyards, and was sought by British, German, and French shipbuilders. The contract for Capitán Prat was awarded to the Société Nouvelle des Forges et Chantiers de la Méditerranée shipyard in La Seyne, France on 18 April 1889. The cost of the ship was agreed at £391,000, a figure which was £4,000 less than the lowest bid submitted by the British shipbuilders, and she was laid down in 1889. The ship was launched on 20 December 1890, commissioned into the Chilean fleet in 1891, and arrived in Chile in May 1893. Capitán Prat received favorable reviews from contemporary naval critics, as she was seen as a prime example of combining a high speed with good armament and armor protection. She was also heralded as "the most powerful war ship possessed by any South American Government [sic] ... [and] any vessel at present in commission in the United States Navy."

The construction of the ship helped begin a naval arms race between Chile and Argentina. In addition to Capitán Prat, the Chilean Navy ordered two new protected cruisers and a pair of torpedo boats. Argentina responded with the coastal defense ships Independencia and Libertad. The race continued through the 1890s, even after the expensive 1891 Chilean Civil War. The race culminated in the orders for two armored cruisers for the Argentine Navy and two Constitución-class battleships for the Chilean Navy, though the latter two were purchased by the United Kingdom. The British, concerned over the possibility of war between the two countries, mediated an agreement, which resulted in the Pactos de Mayo. The treaty ended the expensive arms race and stipulated that both countries arrive at an agreement to balance their fleets. The latter led to the demilitarization of Capitán Prat and two Argentine armored cruisers, though all were later rearmed.

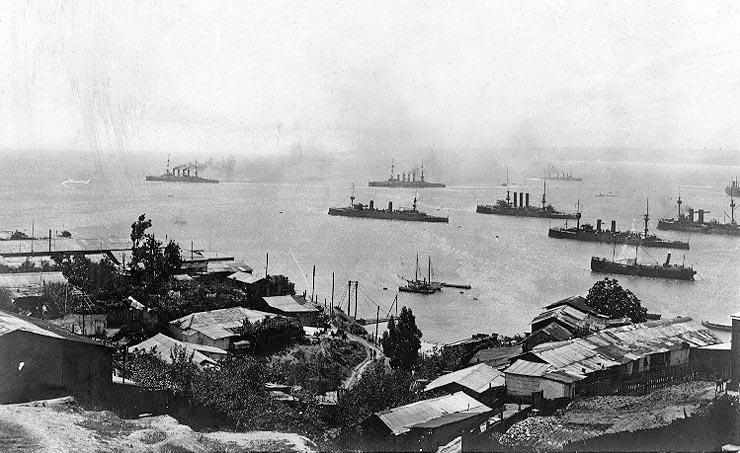
The German East Asia Squadron in Valparaíso in November 1914; Capitán Prat is at extreme right

In March 1898, shortly before the outbreak of the Spanish–American War, the US Navy attempted to purchase Capitán Prat to bolster its fleet for the coming conflict with Spain. The negotiations fell through, however, and the ship remained in Chile. By 1903, in the prelude to the Russo-Japanese War, the Japanese government looked into purchasing Capitán Prat and the cruiser Esmeralda, along with other South American warships. Esmeralda was eventually purchased and commissioned into the Imperial Japanese Navy as Izumi. By 1907, the ship was seen as outmoded in comparison to newer armored cruisers in the fleet. In 1909–1910, the ship was modernized, which included the installation of twelve new Babcock & Wilcox watertube boilers in place of the old cylindrical boilers, increasing the ship's top speed to 19.5 kn (22.4 mph; 36.1 km/h). The height of her funnels was also increased.

On 11 March 1916, Capitán Prat suffered a magazine explosion while she was anchored in port in Valparaíso. Two cases of bad cordite propellant in the aft main battery magazine exploded. The construction of the ship, however, which provided a quick venting of the explosion, and defects in the propellant cases that allowed the explosive gasses to escape easily, saved the ship from destruction. The cordite was by that time 17 to 20 years old, about the maximum life-span of the propellant. By 1926, Capitán Prat was reduced to a coast defense ship. From 1928 to 1930, the ship was designated as a submarine tender for Chile's H and Capitan O'Brien-class submarines. She was disarmed in 1935 to serve with the mechanical training school. The old battleship was ultimately sold for scrap in 1942.
