= HMS Swiftsure (1903) =

British lead ship of Swiftsure-class

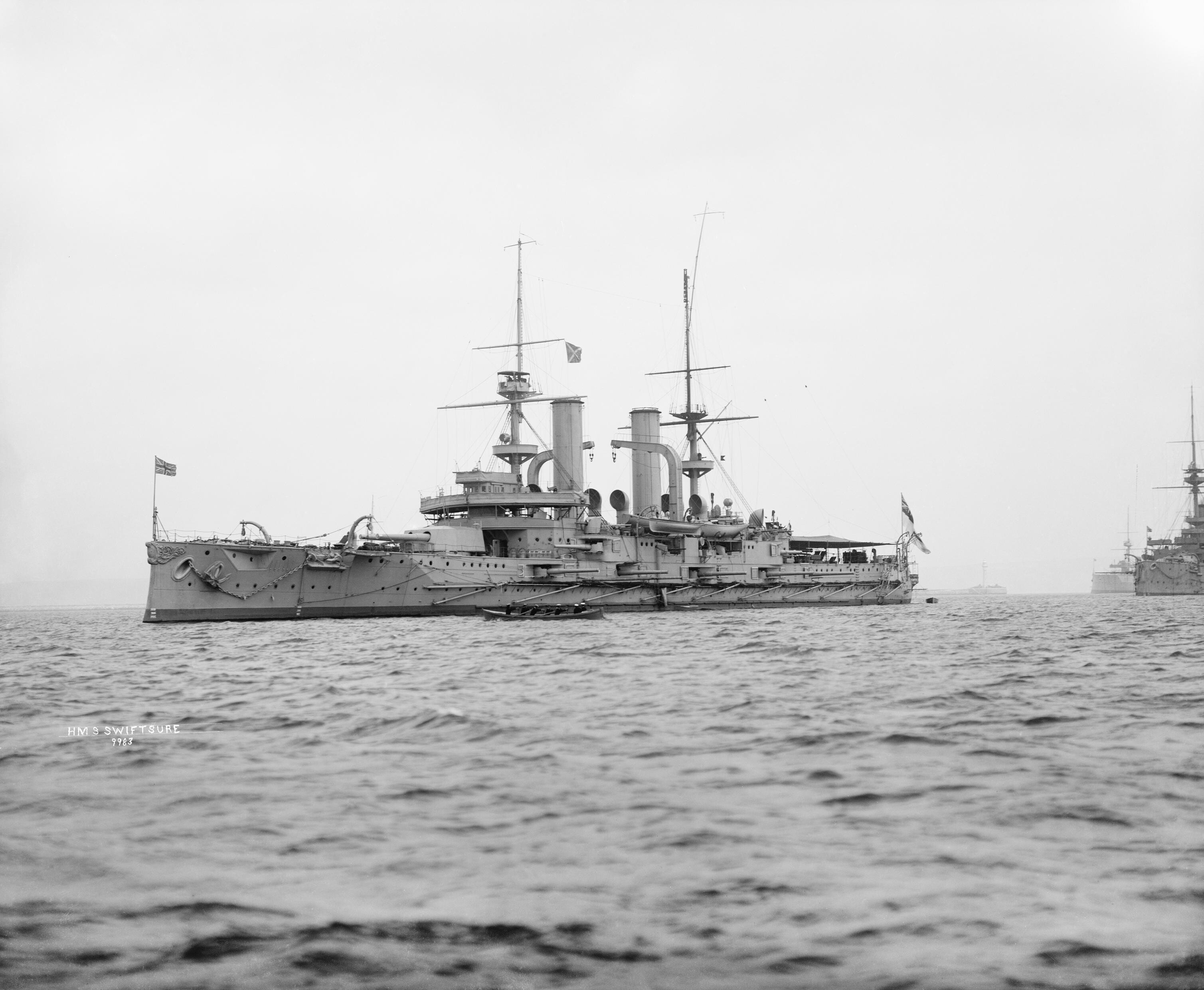
- Swiftsure at anchor

History

Chile
- Name: Constitución
- Ordered: 1901
- Builder: Armstrong Whitworth, Elswick
- Yard number: 733
- Laid down: 26 February 1902
- Launched: 12 January 1903
- Renamed: Swiftsure
- Fate: Sold to the United Kingdom, 3 December 1903

United Kingdom
- Name: Swiftsure
- Completed: June 1904
- Acquired: 3 December 1903
- Commissioned: 21 June 1904
- Decommissioned: April 1917
- Fate: Sold for scrap, 18 June 1920

General characteristics
- Class & type: Swiftsure-class pre-dreadnought battleship
- Displacement: 13,432 long tons (13,648 t) (deep load)
- Length: 475 ft 3 in (144.9 m) (o/a)
- Beam: 71 ft 1 in (21.7 m)
- Draught: 27 ft 3 in (8.3 m) (deep)
- Installed power: 12 × Yarrow boilers; 12,500 ihp (9,300 kW)
- Propulsion: 2 shafts; 2 triple-expansion steam engines
- Speed: 19 knots (35 km/h; 22 mph)
- Range: 6,210 nmi (11,500 km; 7,150 mi) at 10 knots (19 km/h; 12 mph)
- Crew: 729 (1906)
- Armament: 2 × twin 10 in (250 mm) guns; 14 × single 7.5 in (191 mm) guns; 14 × single 14 pdr (3 in (76 mm)) guns; 4 × single 6 pdr (57 mm (2.2 in)) guns; 2 × single 18 in (450 mm) submerged torpedo tubes
- Armour: Belt: 3–7 in (76–178 mm); Bulkheads: 2–6 in (51–152 mm); Decks: 1–3 in (25–76 mm); Conning tower: 11 in (279 mm); Turrets: 8–10 in (203–254 mm); Barbettes: 2–10 in (51–254 mm); Casemates: 7 in (178 mm)

HMS Swiftsure, originally known as Constitución, was the lead ship of the Swiftsure-class pre-dreadnought battleships. The ship was ordered by the Chilean Navy, but she was purchased by the United Kingdom as part of ending the Argentine–Chilean naval arms race. In British service, Swiftsure was initially assigned to the Home Fleet and Channel Fleets before being transferred to the Mediterranean Fleet in 1909. She rejoined Home Fleet in 1912 and was transferred to the East Indies Station in 1913, to act as its flagship.

After the beginning of World War I in August 1914, Swiftsure escorted troop convoys in the Indian Ocean until she was transferred to the Suez Canal Patrol in December. After defending the Canal in early 1915 from Ottoman attacks, the ship was then transferred to the Dardanelles in February and saw action in the Dardanelles Campaign bombarding Ottoman fortifications. Swiftsure was assigned to convoy escort duties in the Atlantic from early 1916 until she was paid off in April 1917 to provide crews for anti-submarine vessels. In mid-1918, the ship was disarmed to be used as a blockship during a proposed second raid on Ostend. Swiftsure was sold for scrap in 1920.

== Design and description ==
Swiftsure was ordered by Chile, with the name of Constitución, in response to the Argentine purchase of two armoured cruisers from Italy during a time of heightened tensions with Argentina. After the crisis subsided, financial problems forced Chile to put the ship up for sale in early 1903; concerned that Russia might buy them, the United Kingdom stepped in and purchased the still-incomplete ships from Chile on 3 December 1903 for £2,432,000. The ship was designed to Chilean specifications, particularly the requirement to fit in the graving dock at Talcahuano, and was regarded by the British as a second-class battleship.

=== General characteristics ===
Swiftsure had an overall length of 475 feet 3 inches (144.9 m), a beam of 71 feet 1 inch (21.7 m), and a draught of 28 feet 6 inches (8.7 m) at deep load. She displaced 12,175 long tons (12,370 t) at standard load and 13,840 long tons (14,060 t) at deep load. At deep load she had a metacentric height of 4.01 feet (1.22 m). In 1906, the crew numbered 729 officers and ratings.

=== Propulsion ===
The ship was powered by two four-cylinder inverted vertical triple-expansion steam engines, each driving one propeller. A dozen Yarrow water-tube boilers provided steam to the engines which produced a total of 12,500 indicated horsepower (9,300 kW) which was intended to allow them to reach a speed of 19.5 knots (36.1 km/h; 22.4 mph). The engines proved to be more powerful than anticipated and Swiftsure exceeded 20 knots (37 km/h; 23 mph) during sea trials. She carried a maximum of 2,048 long tons (2,081 t) of coal, enough to steam 6,210 nautical miles (11,500 km; 7,150 mi) at 10 knots (19 km/h; 12 mph). In service she and her sister proved to be more economical than first thought with an estimated range of 12,000 nautical miles (22,000 km; 14,000 mi) at 10 knots.

=== Armament ===
The ship was armed with four 45-calibre BL 10-inch (254 mm) Mk VI guns in two twin-gun turrets, one each fore and aft of the superstructure. The guns fired 500-pound (227 kg) projectiles at a muzzle velocity of 2,656 ft/s (810 m/s); this provided a maximum range of 14,800 yards (13,500 m) at the gun's maximum elevation of 13.5°. The firing cycle of the Mk VI guns was claimed to be 15 seconds. Each gun was provided with 90 shells. Swiftsure's secondary armament consisted of fourteen 50-calibre BL 7.5-inch (191 mm) Mk III guns. Ten of the guns were mounted in a central battery on the main deck; the other four were in casemates abreast the fore- and mainmasts on the upper deck.

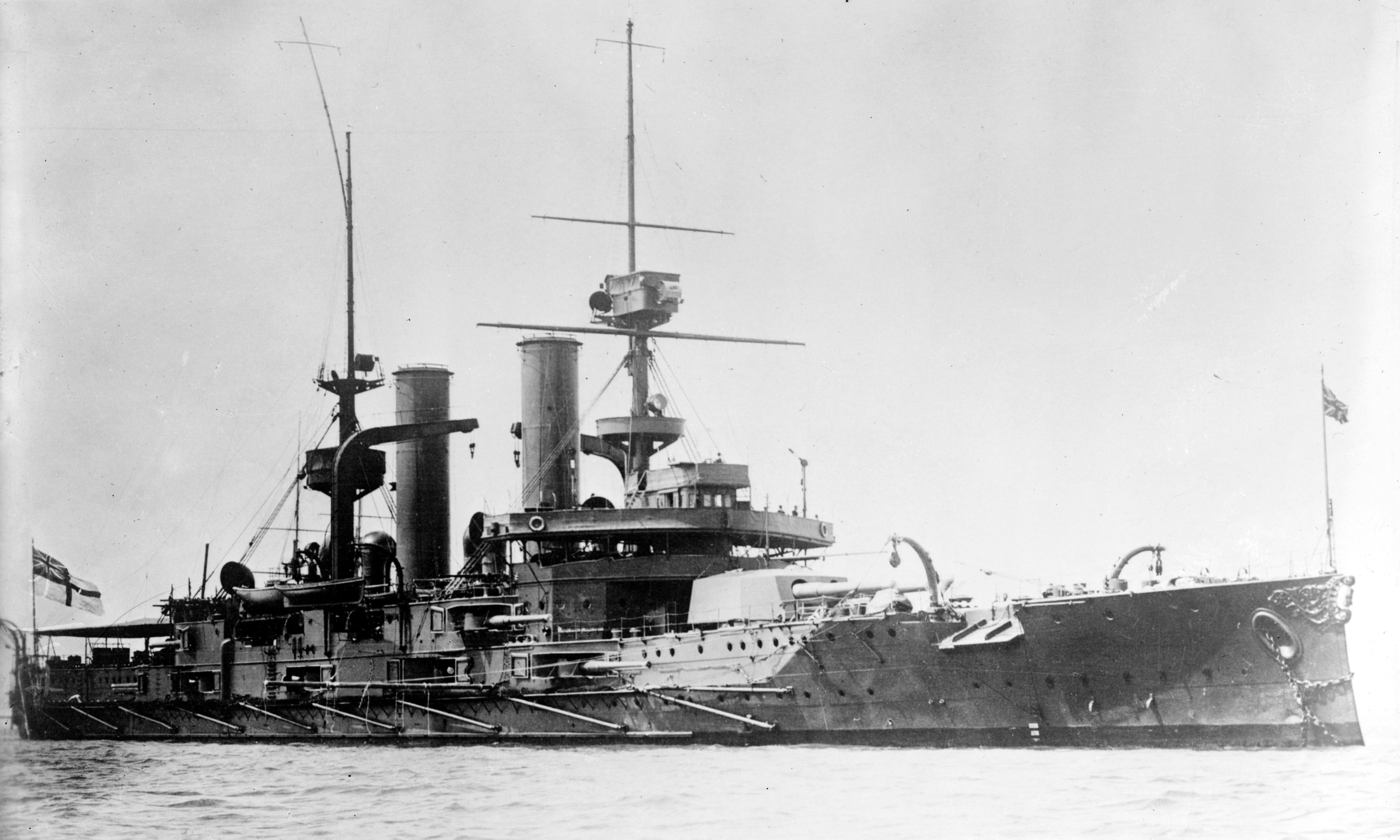
Swiftsure at anchor after about 1908

A serious problem with the guns on the main deck was that they were mounted low in the ship—only about 10 feet (3 m) above water at deep load—and were unusable at high speed or in heavy weather as they dipped their muzzles in the sea when rolling more than 14°. The guns fired 200-pound (91 kg) projectiles at a muzzle velocity of 2,781 ft/s (848 m/s) at a rate of four rounds per minute. At their maximum elevation of 15° they had a maximum range of about 14,000 yards (13,000 m). The ship carried 150 rounds per gun.

Defence against torpedo boats was provided by fourteen QF 14-pounder Mk I guns, the guns were modified to use the standard 12.5-pound (5.7 kg) shell used by the QF 12 pounder (3-inch) 18 cwt (Note: "cwt" is the abbreviation for hundredweight, 18 cwt referring to the weight of the gun.) gun in British service. They fired 3-inch (76 mm), 12.5-lb projectiles at a muzzle velocity of 2,548 ft/s (777 m/s). Their maximum range and rate of fire is unknown. 200 rounds per gun was carried by Swiftsure. The ship also mounted four QF 6-pounder 57 mm (2.2 in) guns in the fighting tops, although these were removed in 1906–1908. The ship was also armed with a pair of 18-inch (450 mm) submerged torpedo tubes, one on each broadside. She was provided with nine torpedoes.

=== Armour ===
The Swiftsures' armour scheme was roughly comparable to that of the Duncan class. The waterline main belt was composed of Krupp cemented armour (KCA) 7 inches (178 mm) thick. It was 8 feet (2.4 m) high of which 5 feet 3 inches (1.6 m) was below the waterline at normal load. Fore and aft of the 2–6-inch (51–152 mm) oblique bulkheads that connected the belt armour to the barbettes, the belt continued, but was reduced in thickness. It was six inches thick abreast the barbettes, but was reduced to two inches fore and aft of the barbettes. It continued forward to the bow and supported the ship's spur-type ram. It continued aft to the steering gear compartment and terminated in 3-inch (76 mm) transverse bulkhead. The upper strake of 7-inch armour covered the ship's side between the rear of the barbettes up to the level of the upper deck. The upper deck casemates were also protected by 7-inch faces and sides, but were enclosed by rear 3-inch plates. The 7.5-inch guns on the main deck were separated by 1-inch (25 mm) screens with .5 inches (12.7 mm) plating protecting the funnel uptakes to their rear. A longitudinal 1-inch bulkhead divided the battery down its centreline.

The turret faces were 9 inches (229 mm) thick and their sides and rear were 8 inches (203 mm) thick. Their roofs were two inches thick and the sighting hood protecting the gunners was 1.5 inches (38 mm) thick. Above the upper deck the barbettes were 10 inches thick on their faces and eight inches on the rear. Below this level they thinned to three and two inches respectively. The conning tower was protected by 11 inches (279 mm) of armour on its face and eight inches on its rear. The deck armour inside the central citadel ranged from 1 to 1.5 inches in thickness. Outside the citadel, the lower deck was three inches thick and sloped to meet the lower side of the belt armour.

== Construction and service ==
=== Pre-World War I ===
Swiftsure was ordered by Chile as Constitución and laid down by Armstrong Whitworth at Elswick on 26 February 1902 and launched on 12 January 1903. She was completed in June 1904 and commissioned at Chatham Dockyard on 21 June 1904 for service in the Home Fleet. Under a fleet reorganisation in January 1905, the Home Fleet became the Channel Fleet. She collided with her sister ship Triumph on 3 June 1905 and suffered damage to her propellers, sternwalk and aft hull. The ship was refitted at Chatham Dockyard in June–July 1906. Swiftsure was briefly placed in reserve at Portsmouth Dockyard from 7 October 1908 until 6 April 1909 when she was recommissioned for service with the Mediterranean Fleet. The ship was reassigned to Home Fleet on 8 May 1912 until she was given a lengthy refit from September 1912 to March 1913. Swiftsure was recommissioned on 26 March and assigned as the flagship of the East Indies Station.

=== World War I ===
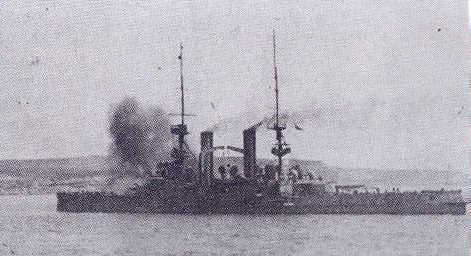
Swiftsure firing on Ottoman positions while covering the landings at West Beach, Cape Helles, 25 April 1915.

During World War I, the ship escorted Indian troop convoys from Bombay to Aden from September–November 1914, when the destruction of the German light cruiser SMS Emden, which had been raiding in the Indian Ocean, made this escort duty unnecessary. She was then transferred to the Suez Canal Patrol on 1 December to help defend the Canal, although she remained East Indies Station flagship while at Suez. From 27 January to 4 February 1915, the ship helped to defend the Canal near Kantara during the First Suez Offensive by Ottoman forces.

Swiftsure was relieved as East Indies Station flagship by the armoured cruiser Euryalus later in February 1915 and transferred to the Dardanelles for service in the Dardanelles Campaign. She joined the Dardanelles Squadron on 28 February 1915 and took part in the attack on Fort Dardanos on 2 March 1915. She and Triumph were detached from the Dardanelles on 5 March 1915 for operations against forts at Smyrna and returned to the Dardanelles on 9 March 1915. She participated in the main attack on the Narrows forts on 18 March 1915 and supported the main landings at West Beach at Cape Helles on 25 April and subsequent landings, including the attack on Achi Baba on 4 June. On 18 September, a German submarine unsuccessfully attacked her while she was on a voyage from Mudros to Suvla Bay. She took part in the bombardment of Dedeagatch on 18 January 1916.

Swiftsure left the Dardanelles in February 1916, departing Kephale on 7 February 1916 for Gibraltar, where she was attached to the 9th Cruiser Squadron for service on the Atlantic Patrol and convoy escort duty in the Atlantic. She transferred out of the 9th Cruiser Squadron in March 1917, departing Sierra Leone on 26 March and arriving at Plymouth on 11 April. Swiftsure was paid off at Chatham on 26 April to provide crews for anti-submarine vessels. She then went into reserve, undergoing a refit at Chatham in mid-1917 and being employed as an accommodation ship beginning in February 1918. In the autumn of 1918 she was disarmed and stripped for use as a blockship in a proposed second attempt to block the entrance to the harbour at Ostend, but the war ended before this operation could take place. The ship was briefly used as a target ship before she was listed for sale in March 1920. Swiftsure was sold for scrap on 18 June 1920 to the Stanlee Shipbreaking Company.
