= Swiftsure-class battleship =

Pre-dreadnought battleship class of the British Royal Navy

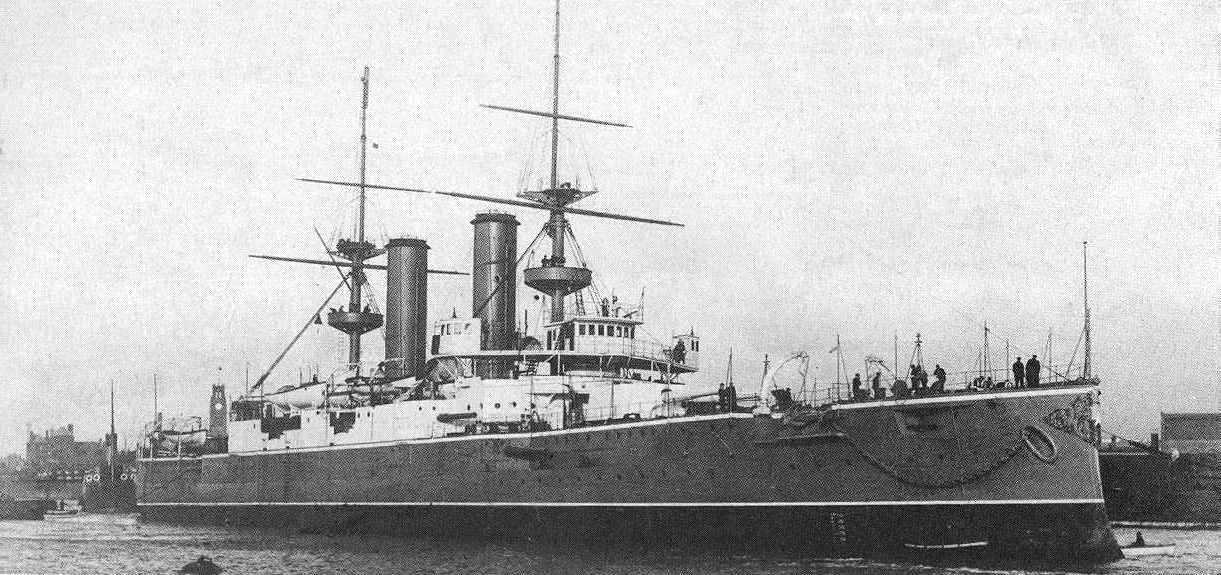
- Triumph as completed in January 1904

Class overview
- Name: Swiftsure-class battleship
- Builders: Armstrong Whitworth; Vickers, Sons & Maxim
- Operators: Royal Navy; Chilean Navy (intended)
- Preceded by: King Edward VII class
- Succeeded by: Lord Nelson class
- Built: 1902–1904
- In commission: 1904–1917
- Completed: 2
- Lost: 1
- Scrapped: 1

General characteristics
- Type: Pre-dreadnought battleship
- Displacement: 12,175 long tons (12,370 t) (normal load); 13,840 long tons (14,060 t) (deep load)
- Length: 475 ft 3 in (144.9 m) (o/a)
- Beam: 71 ft 1 in (21.7 m)
- Draught: 27 ft 4 in (8.3 m) (deep)
- Installed power: 12,500 ihp (9,300 kW); 12 × Yarrow boilers
- Propulsion: 2 × Shafts; 2 × Triple-expansion steam engines
- Speed: 19 knots (35 km/h; 22 mph)
- Range: 6,210 nmi (11,500 km; 7,150 mi) at 10 knots (19 km/h; 12 mph)
- Crew: 803 (1914)
- Armament: 2 × twin 10-inch (254 mm) guns; 14 × single 7.5 in (191 mm) guns; 14 × single 14 pdr (3 in (76 mm)) guns; 4 × single 6 pdr (2.2 in (57 mm)) guns; 2 × single 18 in (450 mm) torpedo tubes
- Armour: Belt: 3–7 in (76–178 mm); Bulkheads: 2–6 in (51–152 mm); Decks: 1–3 in (25–76 mm); Conning tower: 11 in (279 mm); Turrets: 8–10 in (203–254 mm); Barbettes: 2–10 in (51–254 mm); Casemates: 7 in (178 mm)

The Swiftsure class was a group of two British pre-dreadnought battleships. Originally ordered by Chile as the Constitución class during a period of high tension with Argentina, they were intended to defeat a pair of armoured cruisers ordered by the latter country and were optimized for this role. This meant that they were smaller and more lightly armed than most battleships of the time. They were purchased by the United Kingdom in 1903 prior to their completion to prevent their purchase by the Russian Empire as tensions were rising between them and the Japanese Empire, a British ally. Completed the following year, Swiftsure and Triumph had roughly similar careers for the first decade of their service careers. They were initially assigned to the Home Fleet and Channel Fleets before being transferred to the Mediterranean Fleet in 1909. Both ships rejoined the Home Fleet in 1912 and were transferred abroad in 1913, Swiftsure to the East Indies Station as its flagship, and Triumph to the China Station.

After the beginning of World War I in August 1914, Swiftsure escorted troop convoys in the Indian Ocean until she was transferred to the Suez Canal Patrol in December. After defending the Canal in early 1915 from Ottoman attacks, the ship was then transferred to the Dardanelles in February and saw action in the Dardanelles Campaign bombarding Ottoman fortifications. Triumph participated in the hunt for the German East Asia Squadron of Maximilian Graf von Spee and in the campaign against the German colony at Qingdao, China. The ship was transferred to the Mediterranean in early 1915 to participate in the Dardanelles Campaign. She was torpedoed and sunk off Gaba Tepe by the German submarine U-21 on 25 May 1915.

Swiftsure was assigned to convoy escort duties in the Atlantic from early 1916 until she was paid off in April 1917 to provide crews for anti-submarine vessels. In mid-1918, the ship was disarmed and stripped in order to be used as a blockship during a proposed second raid on Ostend. Swiftsure was sold for scrap in 1920.

== Design and description ==
=== Background ===
In late 1901, Chile and Argentina were on the brink of war, and Chile was concerned about its navy's ability to counter the armoured cruisers Rivadavia and Mariano Moreno, which Argentina had ordered from Italy earlier that year. Sir Edward Reed, chief designer for Armstrong Whitworth, was in Chile for health reasons at the time, and met with Chilean Navy officials to discuss the idea of purchasing or building two battleships with high speed and a powerful armament on a low displacement. Purchase of existing ships was not a practical option, so the Chileans asked Reed to design the ships for construction in the United Kingdom. Chile ordered the ships, to be named Constitución and Libertad, in 1901, Constitución from Armstrong Whitworth at Elswick and Libertad from Vickers at Barrow-in-Furness.

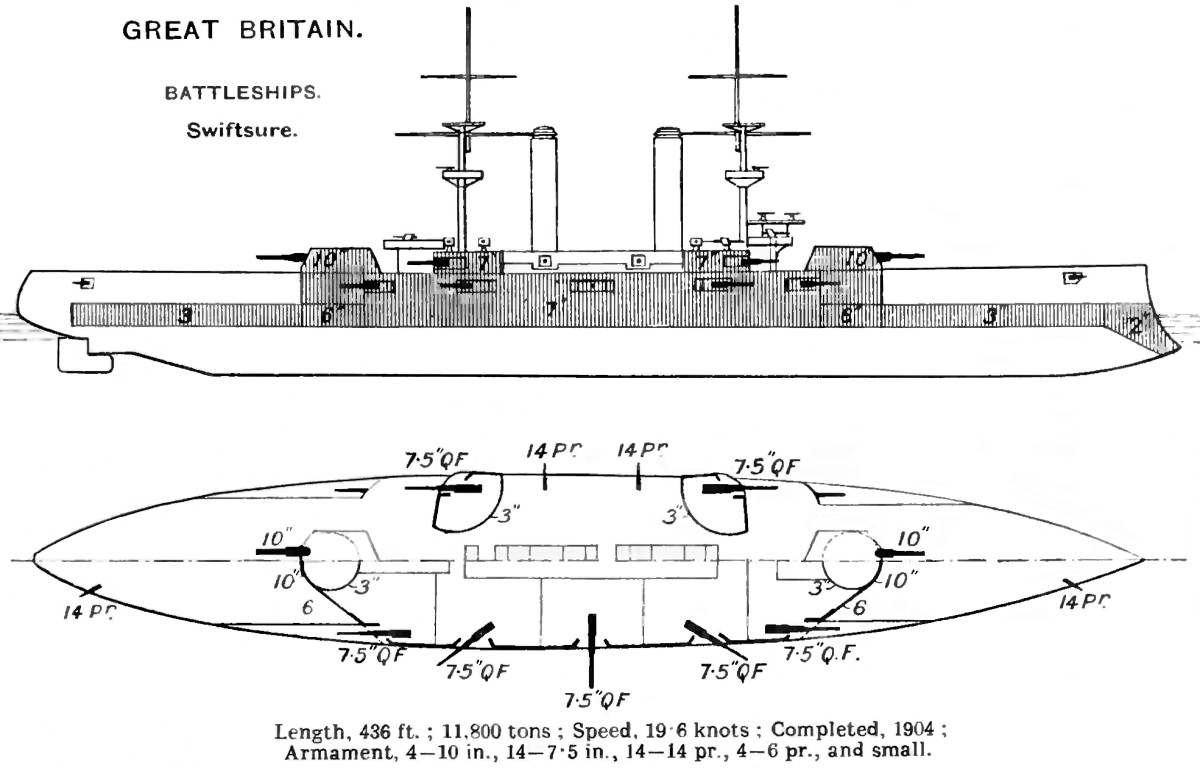
Right elevation and deck plan as depicted in Brassey's Naval Annual 1915

The ships were considered second-class battleships, lightly constructed, armed, and armoured by British standards; Swiftsure, in fact, suffered from structural weakness while in service and required hull strengthening, although Triumph did not have such problems. Chile had required the ships to fit into the graving dock at Talcahuano, so they had to be longer and narrower for their displacement than ships built to British standards. Details in mast and anchor arrangements as well as the arrangement of magazines and shell-handling rooms also were different from British standards.

As part of the Pacts of May, which ended the near-war tensions between Argentina and Chile, Argentina sold its two armored cruisers, Rivadavia and Moreno, that were under construction in Italy to Japan. Constitución and Libertad were put up for sale in early 1903. While the United Kingdom was not entirely interested in the ships, international politics took precedence: when the Russian Empire made an offer for the ships, the British grew concerned that they could be used against their new ally Japan. To prevent this, the British purchased both Chilean battleships on 3 December 1903 for £2,432,000.

Their purchase by the Admiralty was organised by the London firm of Antony Gibbs & Sons, a partnership run by Alban Gibbs and his younger brother Vicary Gibbs. Both were Members of Parliament (MPs), and their role in the transaction meant that they were disqualified from the House of Commons, under an old law which debarred MPs from accepting contracts from the Crown. This triggered two by-elections, in which Alban was re-elected unopposed, but Vicary lost his seat.

Although they were designed to Chilean rather than British requirements and required some modifications during construction after their purchase, no major changes were needed to the design to render them suitable for British service. Both were completed in June 1904 and entered service with the Royal Navy, Constitución as Swiftsure and Libertad as HMS Triumph.

=== General characteristics ===
The Swiftsure-class ships had an overall length of 475 feet 3 inches (144.9 m), a beam of 71 feet 1 inch (21.7 m), and a draught of 28 feet 6 inches (8.7 m) at deep load. They displaced 12,175 long tons (12,370 t) at normal load and 13,840 long tons (14,060 t) at deep load. The ships were some 375 long tons (381 t) overweight compared to their designed displacement which increased their draught and reduced their freeboard.

In 1914, the crew numbered 803 officers and ratings. The Swiftsures were quite manoeuvrable as a result of their balanced rudder and a hull form optimized to make the rudder more effective. They were the last British battleships to enter service with bow crests and were also the last to enter service equipped with ventilation cowls.

=== Propulsion ===
The ships were powered by two four-cylinder inverted vertical triple-expansion steam engines, each driving a single propeller. A dozen Yarrow boilers provided steam to the engines at a working pressure of 280 psi (1,931 kPa; 20 kgf/cm^{2}). The engines produced a total of 12,500 indicated horsepower (9,300 kW) which was intended to allow the ships to reach a speed of 19.5 knots (36.1 km/h; 22.4 mph). The engines proved to be more powerful than anticipated and both ships exceeded 20 knots (37 km/h; 23 mph) during sea trials. This made them the fastest battleships in the Royal Navy at the time of their completion, although their sustained speed in service was slightly slower than that of the older Duncan class. They carried a maximum of 2,048 long tons (2,081 t) of coal, enough to steam 6,210 nautical miles (11,500 km; 7,150 mi) at 10 knots (19 km/h; 12 mph). In service they proved to be more economical than first thought with an estimated range of 12,000 nautical miles (22,000 km; 14,000 mi) at 10 knots.

=== Armament ===
Neither ship's armament was of a standard Royal Navy type—they had been designed to meet the requirements of the Chilean Navy and each ship was armed by its respective builder, although performance was identical. They were the first British battleships since Renown of 1895 to mount a main battery of 10-inch (254 mm) guns and the last to do so. The ships mounted slightly different types of 45-calibre 10-inch guns, each ship using guns designed by its builder. They followed the standard British practice of the time of mounting the main battery in two twin turrets, one forward and one aft. The Royal Navy believed that the 10-inch guns were too light to be effective against modern battleships; they could penetrate the armour of the latest German and Russian battleships, but not that of the better-armoured French battleships. The guns had minor differences in construction, but they both fired 500-pound (227 kg) projectiles at a muzzle velocity of 2,656 ft/s (810 m/s); this provided a maximum range of 14,800 yards (13,500 m) at the gun's maximum elevation of 13.5°. The firing cycle of the Mk VI guns used on Swiftsure was claimed to be 15 seconds while that of the Mk VII guns on Triumph was 20–25 seconds. Each gun was provided with 90 shells per gun.

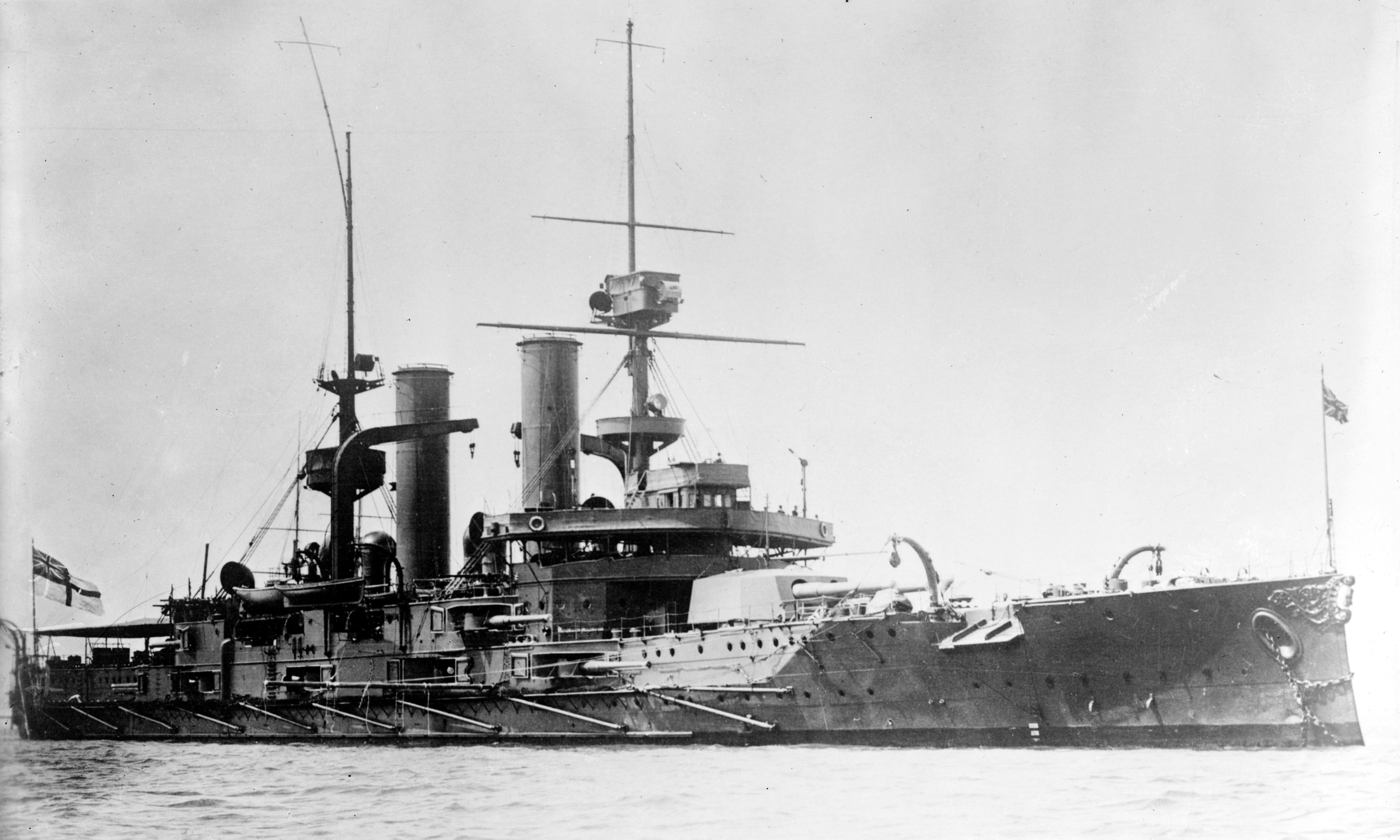
Swiftsure at anchor

They had a powerful secondary battery, being the only British battleships to mount 50-calibre 7.5-inch guns; these were of a different type than the 7.5-inch guns mounted on later British cruisers. Ten of the guns were mounted in a central battery on the main deck, where they were criticized for taking up too much deck space; the other four were in casemates abreast the fore- and mainmasts on the upper deck. A more serious problem was that they were mounted low in the ship—only about 10 feet (3 m) above water at deep load—and were unusable at high speed or in heavy weather as they dipped their muzzles in the sea when rolling more than 14°. The two types of guns differed slightly in construction, but had identical performance. They fired 200-pound (91 kg) projectiles at a muzzle velocity of 2,781 ft/s (848 m/s) at a rate of four rounds per minutes. At their maximum elevation of 15° they had a maximum range of about 14,000 yards (13,000 m). The ships carried 150 rounds per gun.

Defence against torpedo boats was provided by fourteen QF (quick-firing) 14-pounder Mk I or Mk II guns firing 14-pound (6.4 kg) shells, but the guns were modified to use the standard 12.5-pound (5.7 kg) shell used by the QF 12 pounder 18 cwt (Note: "cwt" is the abbreviation for hundredweight, 12 cwt referring to the weight of the gun.) gun in British service. They fired 3-inch (76 mm), 12.5-lb projectiles at a muzzle velocity of 2,548 ft/s (777 m/s). Their maximum range and rate of fire is unknown. 200 rounds per gun were carried by each ship.

The ships were also equipped with a pair of 17.7 in (450 mm) submerged torpedo tubes, one on each broadside. They were provided with nine torpedoes.

=== Armour ===
The Swiftsures' armour scheme was roughly comparable to that of the Duncan class. The waterline main belt was composed of Krupp cemented armour (KCA) 7 inches (178 mm) thick. It was 8 feet (2.4 m) high of which 5 feet 3 inches (1.6 m) was below the waterline at normal load. Fore and aft of the 2–6-inch (51–152 mm) oblique bulkheads that connected the belt armour to the barbettes, the belt continued, but was reduced in thickness. It was six inches thick abreast the barbettes, but was reduced to two inches fore and aft of the barbettes. It continued forward to the bow and supported the ship's spur-type ram. It continued aft to the steering gear compartment and terminated in a 3-inch (76 mm) transverse bulkhead. The upper strake of 7-inch armour covered the ship's side between the rear of the barbettes up to the level of the upper deck. The upper deck casemates were also protected by 7-inch faces and sides, but were enclosed by rear 3-inch plates. The 7.5-inch guns on the main deck were separated by 1-inch (25 mm) screens with .5 inches (12.7 mm) plating protecting the funnel uptakes to their rear. A longitudinal 1-inch bulkhead divided the battery down its centreline.

The turret faces were 9 inches (229 mm) thick and their sides and rear were 8 inches (203 mm) thick. Their roofs were two inches thick and the sighting hood protecting the gunners was 1.5 inches (38 mm) thick. Above the upper deck the barbettes were 10 inches (254 mm) thick on their faces and eight inches on the rear. Below this level they thinned to three and two inches respectively. The conning tower was protected by 11 inches (279 mm) of armour on its face and eight inches on its rear. The deck armour inside the central citadel ranged from 1 to 1.5 inches in thickness. Outside the citadel, the lower deck was three inches thick and sloped to meet the lower side of the belt armour. Naval historian R. A. Burt assessed the greatest weakness of their armour scheme as the reduction in the thickness of the barbette armour below the upper deck. He believed that this made the ships' magazines vulnerable to oblique hits near the barbettes.

== Ships ==
Construction data
Ship	Builder	Laid down	Launched	Completed	Fate	Cost (excluding armament)
Swiftsure (ex-Constitución)	Armstrong Whitworth, Elswick	26 February 1902	12 January 1903	June 1904	Sold for scrap, 18 June 1920	£846,596
Triumph (ex-Libertad)	Vickers, Sons & Maxim, Barrow-in-Furness	26 February 1902	15 January 1903	June 1904	Sunk by U-21, 25 May 1915	£847,520

== Service history ==
=== Swiftsure ===
Swiftsure was commissioned on 21 June 1904 for service in the Home Fleet and the Channel Fleet until 1908. She collided with Triumph 3 June 1905 and suffered damage to her propellers, sternwalk and aft hull. The ship was refitted at Chatham Dockyard in June–July 1906. Swiftsure was briefly placed in reserve from 7 October 1908 to 6 April 1909 when she was recommissioned for service with the Mediterranean Fleet. The ship was reassigned to Home Fleet on 8 May 1912 until she was given a lengthy refit from September 1912 to March 1913. Swiftsure was recommissioned on 26 March and assigned as the flagship of the East Indies Station.

During World War I, the ship escorted Indian troops from Bombay to Aden from September–November 1914. She was then transferred to the Suez Canal Patrol on 1 December to help defend the Canal. From 27 January to 4 February 1915, the ship helped to defend the Canal during the First Suez Offensive by Ottoman forces. Swiftsure was then transferred to the Dardanelles on 28 February and saw action in the Dardanelles Campaign bombarding Ottoman fortifications. She was assigned to the 9th Cruiser Squadron for escort duties in the Atlantic in February 1916. On 11 April 1917, the ship arrived at Chatham where she was paid off and placed in reserve to provide crews for anti-submarine vessels. Swiftsure was refitted in mid-1917 and was used as an accommodation ship from February 1918. Later that year, the ship was disarmed and stripped in order to be used as a blockship during a proposed second raid on Ostend. The war ended, however, before this was carried out and she was briefly used as a target ship before she was listed for sale in March 1920. Swiftsure was sold for scrap on 18 June 1920 to the Stanlee Shipbreaking Company.

=== Triumph ===
Much like Swiftsure, Triumph was commissioned on 21 June 1904 and was initially assigned to the Home Fleet, later the Channel Fleet, until 1909. On 17 September 1904 the ship was struck by SS Siren off Pembroke Dock and was only slightly damaged. The following year, she accidentally struck her sister ship and sustained damage to her bow. Triumph received a brief refit at Chatham Dockyard in October 1908 and was transferred to the Mediterranean Fleet on 26 April 1909. The ship returned to the Home Fleet in May 1912. She was transferred to the China Station on 28 August 1913 and was placed in reserve at Hong Kong until mobilized in August 1914 at the beginning of World War I.

Triumph participated in the hunt for the German East Asia Squadron and in the campaign against the German colony at Qingdao, China until November when she began a refit at Hong Kong. The ship departed on 12 January 1915 to participate in the Dardanelles Campaign. She was torpedoed and sunk off Gaba Tepe by the German submarine U-21 while bombarding Ottoman fortifications in the Dardanelles on 25 May 1915.
