= Chilean cruiser Presidente Pinto =

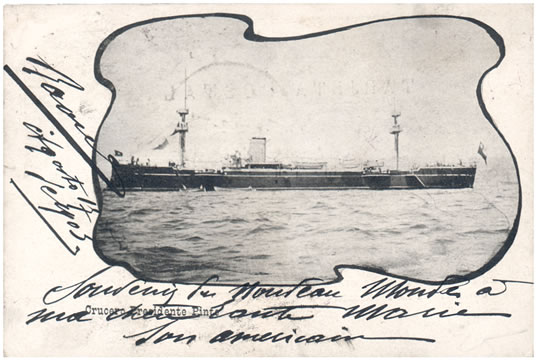
- Chilean cruiser Presidente Pinto in a postcard

History

Chile
- Name: Presidente Pinto
- Namesake: Aníbal Pinto Garmendia
- Ordered: 1887
- Builder: Forges et Chantiers de la Méditerranée, La Seyne
- Launched: 4 September 1890
- Commissioned: 1 January 1892
- Fate: Sunk near Quellón on 26 May 1905

General characteristics
- Class & type: Presidente Errázuriz class protected cruiser
- Displacement: 2,047 t
- Length: 268 feet 4 inches (81.79 m)
- Beam: 35 ft 9.0 in (10.896 m)
- Draught: 14 feet 5 inches (4.39 m)
- Propulsion: 5,400 ihp (4,000 kW)
- Speed: 18.35 kn (33.98 km/h; 21.12 mph)
- Range: 400 t bunkerage
- Armament: 4 × 5.9-inch (150 mm)/36 caliber guns; 2 × 4.7-inch (120 mm)/36 caliber guns; 4 × 57 mm (2.2 in)/40 caliber guns; 2 × Gatling machine guns; 3 × 14-inch (360 mm) torpedo tubes
- Armor: Deck: 2.25 in (57 mm); Casemate: 3.25 in (83 mm)

Presidente Pinto was a Presidente Errázuriz class protected cruiser of the Chilean Navy. She was built, like her sister ship, the protected cruiser Presidente Errázuriz, in France supervised by Juan José Latorre. The ships were ordered in 1887 by President José Manuel Balmaceda before the beginning of the 1891 Chilean Civil War.

== Service history ==
Illustration of Presidente Pinto

During the 1891 Chilean Civil War, the two cruisers lay incomplete in French dockyards alongside the pre-dreadnought battleship Capitán Prat. If these had been secured by the Balmacedists the naval supremacy of the congress would have been seriously challenged. The congressional forces formally requested that the ships be detained. None of the three ships were involved in the Civil War.

Presidente Pinto was launched at the shipyards of the Forges et Chantiers de la Méditerranée, La Seyne on 4 September 1890 and sailed to Chile on 5 August 1891, before having been completed. Her artillery was supplied from an English merchant in the North Sea while transiting to Chile.

Her voyage to Chile saw some trouble, forced to return to Le Havre in order to pick up crew and insubordination of the crew. She arrived to Valparaíso in September 1892, too late to participate in the Civil War.

The engines had to be repaired because of the improper conditioning during the voyage to Chile.

In 1902, during the Thousand Days' War, the Colombian Government tried unsuccessfully to purchase Presidente Pinto.

== See also ==
- South American dreadnought race
- List of decommissioned ships of the Chilean Navy
