= Chilean cruiser Chacabuco (1898) =

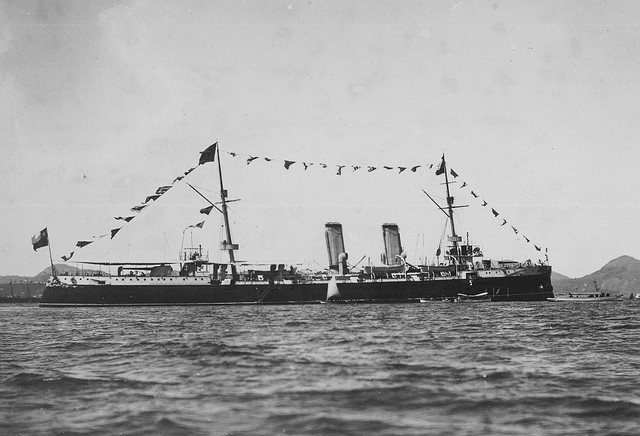
- Chilean cruiser Chacabuco, 1898

History

Chile
- Name: Chacabuco
- Namesake: Battle of Chacabuco
- Builder: Armstrong Whitworth
- Launched: 4 July 1898
- Acquired: 1902
- Out of service: December 1950
- Stricken: 15 December 1959
- Fate: Scrapped

General characteristics
- Class & type: Protected cruiser
- Displacement: 4,160 long tons (4,230 t)
- Length: 360 ft (109.7 m)
- Beam: 46 ft 6 in (14.2 m)
- Draught: 17 ft (5.2 m)
- Installed power: 15,700 ihp (11,700 kW)
- Propulsion: 2 shafts, vertical triple-expansion steam engines; cylindrical boilers
- Speed: 23 knots (43 km/h; 26 mph)
- Complement: 400
- Armament: 2 × 1 - 8-inch (203 mm) guns; 10 × 1 - 4.7-inch (120 mm) guns; 12 × 1 - 3-inch (76 mm) guns; 6 × 1 - 3-pounder guns; 3 × 1 - 18-inch (457 mm) torpedo tubes
- Armour: Deck: 1.75–4.5 in (44–114 mm); Main gun shields: 4.5 in (114 mm); Conning tower: 3 in (76 mm)

The Chilean cruiser Chacabuco was a protected cruiser of the Chilean Navy. Built at the end of the 19th Century, the Chacabuco had a remarkably long and varied career spanning nearly half a century.

== History ==
The Chacabuco was built as a private venture by Armstrong Whitworth to a typical Elswick cruiser design, and was launched on 4 July 1898, under the provisional name of Fourth of July; she was acquired by Chile in 1902, just before the end of the Argentine–Chilean naval arms race. The Imperial Japanese Navy cruiser Takasago was the sister ship of the Chacabuco.

During her lengthy career the Chacabuco performed numerous tasks: apart from routine patrol and hydrographic duties, she was notable for her role in maintaining order in the aftermath of the 1906 Valparaíso earthquake; her involvement in the Santa María School massacre in 1907; her visit to Britain for the fleet review to mark the coronation of King George V in 1911; and her relief effort to the victims of the 1922 Vallenar earthquake. The Chacabuco was put into reserve in 1928.

In 1941, as Chile strove to maintain its neutrality during World War II, the Chacabuco was brought out of reserve despite her age: by then there were no other cruisers available to the Chilean Navy. She underwent modernization, with her armament changed to six 6 inch/50 guns and ten 20 mm anti-aircraft guns. Thereafter she served as the flagship of the Chilean Navy on several occasions, before becoming a midshipmen training cruiser from 1949 to 1950.

The Chacabuco went out of service in December 1950; she was struck on 15 December 1959, and was sold to the Compañía de Acero del Pacífico for scrapping.

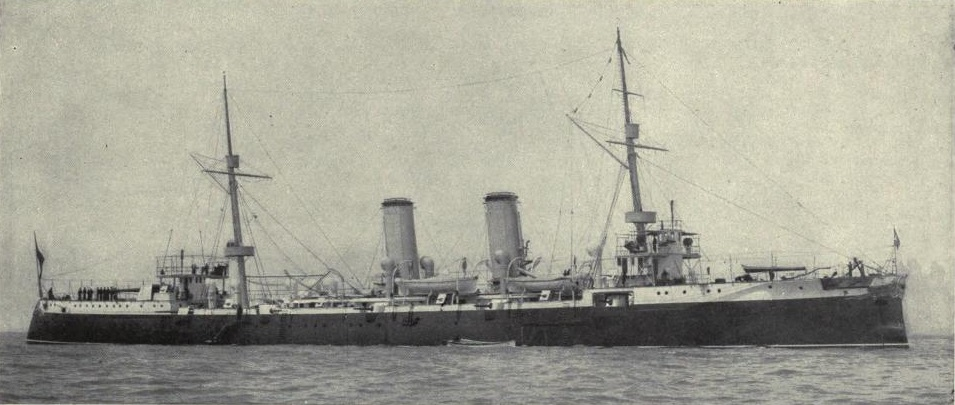
Chilean cruiser Chacabuco

== See also ==
Media related to Chilean cruiser Chacabuco (1898) at Wikimedia Commons

- List of decommissioned ships of the Chilean Navy
- South American dreadnought race
