= HMS Chelmer (1904) =

Destroyer of the Royal Navy

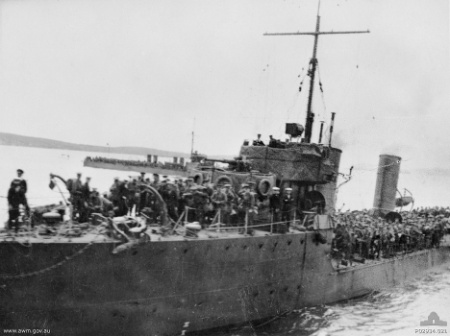
- HMS Chelmer at Mudros

History

United Kingdom
- Name: HMS Chelmer
- Ordered: 1903 – 1904 Naval Estimates
- Builder: John I Tornycroft Chiswick
- Laid down: 11 December 1903
- Launched: 8 December 1904
- Commissioned: June 1905
- Out of service: 1919 laid up in reserve awaiting disposal
- Honours and awards: Dardanelles 1915 - 1916
- Fate: 30 June 1920 sold to Thos. W. Ward of Sheffield for breaking at Hayle, Cornwall

General characteristics
- Class & type: Thornycroft Type River Class destroyer
- Displacement: 550 long tons (559 t) standard; 615 long tons (625 t) full load; 225 ft 9 in (68.81 m) o/a; 23 ft 10.5 in (7.277 m) Beam; 8 ft (2.4 m) Draught
- Propulsion: 4 × Thornycroft water tube boiler; 2 × Vertical Triple Expansion (VTE) steam engines driving 2 shafts producing 7,000 shp (5,200 kW) (average)
- Speed: 25.5 kn (47.2 km/h)
- Range: 127 tons coal; 1,695 nmi (3,139 km) at 11 kn (20 km/h)
- Complement: 70 officers and men
- Armament: 1 × QF 12-pounder 12 cwt Mark I, mounting P Mark I; 3 × QF 12-pounder 8 cwt, mounting G Mark I (Added in 1906); 5 × QF 6-pounder 8 cwt (removed in 1906); 2 × single tubes for 18-inch (450mm) torpedoes

Service record
- Part of: East Coast Destroyer Flotilla – 1904; China Station – 1909/10; 5th Destroyer Flotilla – Dec 1914
- Operations: World War I 1914–1918

HMS Chelmer was a Thornycroft Type River Class destroyer ordered by the Royal Navy under the 1903–1904 Naval Estimates. Named after the River Chelmer in eastern England, north-east of London, she was the first ship to carry this name in the Royal Navy.

== Construction ==
She was laid down on 11 December 1903 at the Thornycroft shipyard at Chiswick and launched on 8 December 1904. She was completed in June 1905. Her original armament was to be the same as the Turleback torpedo boat destroyers that preceded her. In 1906 the Admiralty decided to upgrade the armament by landing the five 6-pounder naval guns and shipping three 12-pounder 8 hundredweight (cwt) guns. Two would be mounted abeam at the foc's'le break, and the third gun would be mounted on the quarterdeck.

== Pre-War ==
After commissioning she was assigned to the East Coast Destroyer Flotilla of the 1st Fleet and based at Harwich.

From 1908 to 1910 she was under the command of Lieutenant Loftus W. Jones.

On 27 April 1908 the Eastern Flotilla departed Harwich for live fire and night manoeuvres. During these exercises the cruiser Attentive rammed and sank the destroyer Gala then damaged Ribble.

In 1909/1910 she was assigned to China Station.

On 30 August 1912 the Admiralty directed all destroyers were to be grouped into classes designated by letters starting with the 'A'. The ships of the River Class were assigned to the E Class. After 30 September 1913, she was known as an E Class destroyer and had the letter 'E' painted on the hull below the bridge area and on either the fore or aft funnel.

== First World War ==
In July 1914 she was on China Station based at Hong Kong tendered to HMS Triumph. At the outbreak of war she was in dockyard hands undergoing a refit. On 14 September 1914, she captured the German collier Tannenfels in the Basilan Strait, south of Mindanao. The United States protested about Chelmer's action, claiming that Tannenfels was within American territorial waters, but Britain rejected that claim. With the fall of Tsingtao and the sinking of the SMS Emden, Chelmer, along with the other River-class destroyers attached to the China Station, was redeployed to the 5th Destroyer Flotilla in the Mediterranean Fleet in November 1914, replacing more modern destroyers that had been recalled to British waters.

On 18 March 1915 she in conjunction with HMS Jed and HMS Colne assisted with the rescue of the crew of the battleship HMS Ocean after she struck a mine in the Dardanelles.

On 25 April 1915 under the command of Lieutenant-Commander H. T. England, RN, she supported the landings at ANZAC Cove. While ferrying troops ashore she suffered one of her crew killed in action.

On 25 May 1915 she was patrolling near HMS Triumph when she was torpedoed. She attacked the submarine without success then returned to aid in the rescue efforts.

She remained in the Mediterranean for the duration of the war.

== Disposition ==
In 1919 she returned to Home waters, was paid off and laid up in reserve awaiting disposal. On 30 June 1920 she was sold to Thos. W. Ward of Sheffield for breaking at Hayle, Cornwall.

She was awarded the Battle Honour Dardanelles 1915 – 1916 for her service.

== Pennant numbers ==
It is not known if she was assigned a pennant number as no record has been found.

== Bibliography ==
- Chesneau, Roger & Kolesnik, Eugene M., eds. (1979). Conway's All The World's Fighting Ships 1860–1905. London: Conway Maritime Press. ISBN 0-85177-133-5.
- Colledge, J. J.; Warlow, Ben (2006) [1969]. Ships of the Royal Navy: The Complete Record of All Fighting Ships of the Royal Navy from the 15th Century to the Present (3rd Rev ed.). London: Chatham Publishing. ISBN 978-1-86176-281-8. OCLC 67375475.
- Dittmar, F.J.; Colledge, J. J. (1972). British Warships 1914–1919. Shepperton, UK: Ian Allan. ISBN 0-7110-0380-7.
- Friedman, Norman (2009). British Destroyers: From Earliest Days to the Second World War. Barnsley, UK: Seaforth Publishing. ISBN 978-1-84832-049-9.
- Gardiner, Robert & Gray, Randal, eds. (1985). Conway's All The World's Fighting Ships 1906–1921. London: Conway Maritime Press. ISBN 0-85177-245-5.
- Manning, T. D. (1961). The British Destroyer. London: Putnam & Co. OCLC 6470051.
- March, Edgar J. (1966). British Destroyers: A History of Development, 1892–1953; Drawn by Admiralty Permission From Official Records & Returns, Ships' Covers & Building Plans. London: Seeley, Service. OCLC 164893555.
- Monograph No. 16: The China Squadron, 1914, Including the Emden Hunt (PDF). Naval Staff Monographs (Historical). Vol. V. The Naval Staff, Training and Staff Duties Division. 1922.
- Monograph No. 21: The Mediterranean 1914–1915 (PDF). Naval Staff Monographs (Historical). Vol. VIII. The Naval Staff, Training and Staff Duties Division. 1923.
- "The Allied China Squadron" (PDF). The Naval Review. Vol. III, no. 2. 1915. pp. 312–321. Archived from the original (PDF) on 21 October 2016.
- "The Work of a Naval Trawler in the Ægean Sea" (PDF). The Naval Review. Vol. VI. pp. 13–66. Archived from the original (PDF) on 21 October 2016.
