= ARA Nueve de Julio (1892) =

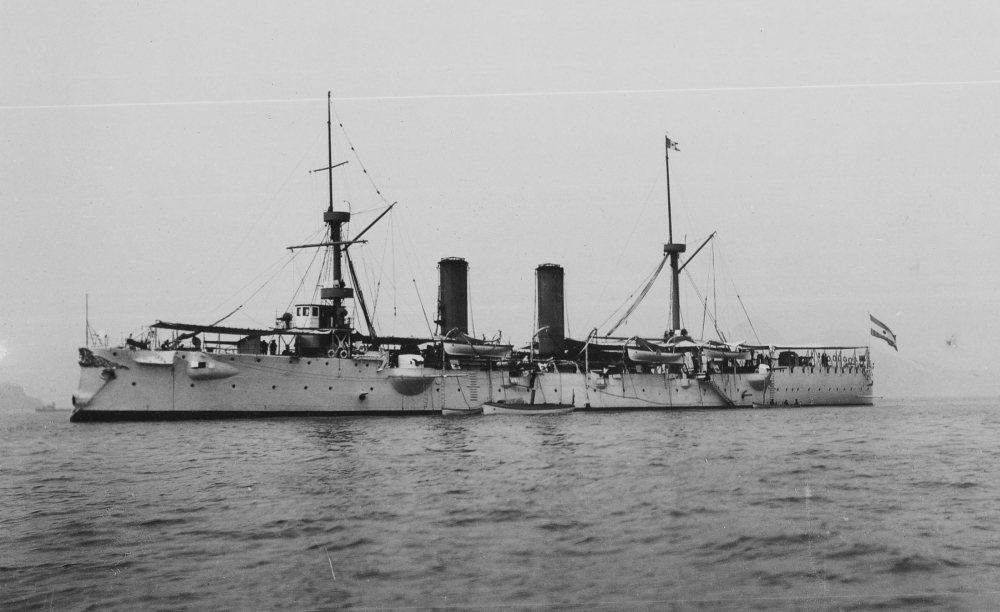
- The 9 de Julio in 1910.

History

Argentina
- Name: Nueve de Julio
- Namesake: 9 July 1816, the date of Argentine Independence
- Builder: Armstrong, Mitchell & Co., Elswick
- Launched: 1892
- Completed: 1893
- Fate: Discarded 1930

General characteristics
- Type: Protected cruiser
- Displacement: 3600 tons
- Length: 354 ft (107.9 m)
- Beam: 44 ft (13.4 m)
- Draft: 16 ft 6 in (5.03 m)
- Propulsion: 2-shaft VTE, 14,500 ihp (10,800 kW), 8 cylindrical boilers, 350 to 750 tons coal
- Speed: 22.25 knots (25.60 mph; 41.21 km/h)
- Complement: 327
- Armament: 4 × 6-inch (152 mm) QF guns; 8 × 4.7 in (120 mm) QF guns; 12 × 3-pounder QF guns; 5 × 18 in (460 mm) torpedo tubes
- Armour: Protected deck: 4.5–3.5 in (114–89 mm) slopes 3.5–1.75 in (89–44 mm) flat areas; Glacis over engines: 5 in (130 mm); Gun shields: 2 in (51 mm); Conning tower: 4 in (100 mm)

Nueve de Julio was a protected cruiser of the Argentine Navy. The ship was acquired by the Argentine navy as part of the South American naval arms race in the 1890s. Completed in 1893, the vessel remained in service until 1930.

== Design and construction ==
Argentina and its rival Chile purchased a series of cruisers in a local naval arms race from the 1890s to 1902, in which Armstrong of Elswick sold ships to both sides, as well as to Brazil.

Nueve de Julio was designed by Philip Watts and was one of a series of fast protected cruisers built by Armstrong (Elswick, England) for export. The ship was a second-class protected cruiser with quick-firing guns, in contrast to Argentina's previous "Elswick" ship Veinticinco de Mayo which on a similar-size hull that mounted 8.2-inch (208 mm) main guns. The ship was therefore similar to its predecessor Piemonte built for Italy, the first cruiser with an all-quick firing armament, and the following Elswick cruiser Yoshino built for Japan, which was the fastest ship in the First Sino-Japanese War and performed well in action.

The cruiser had a double bottom except in the boiler and engine rooms (where the hull was not deep enough) and the protective deck had a raised glacis over the engines. Originally the torpedo tubes would have been 14-inch (356 mm), the substitution with a larger type delayed its construction.

== History ==
Launched in 1892, the ship was completed in 1893. Nueve de Julio remained in service until being discarded in 1930.

== See also ==
- List of cruisers
- List of ships of the Argentine Navy
