= HMS Triumph (1903) =

Swiftsure-class pre-dreadnought battleship

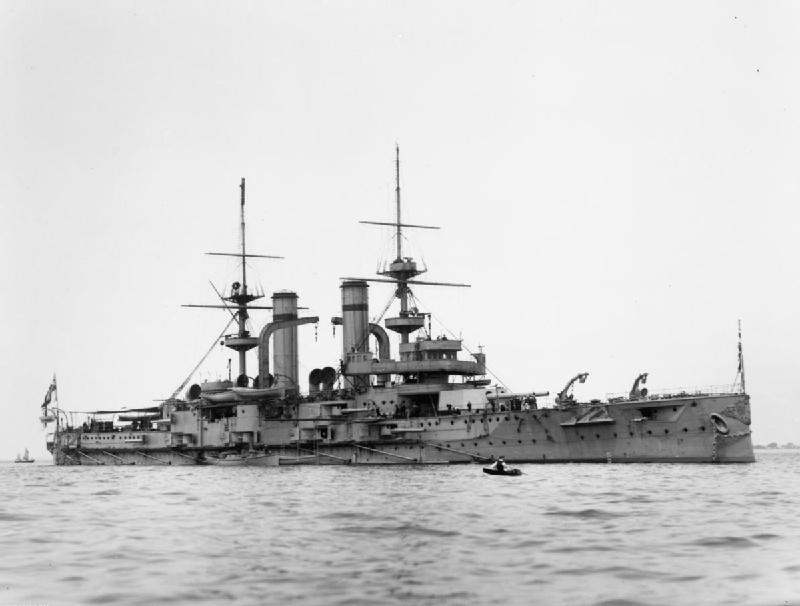
- HMS Triumph

History

Chile
- Name: Libertad
- Ordered: 1901
- Builder: Vickers, Sons & Maxim, Barrow-in-Furness
- Laid down: 26 February 1902
- Launched: 15 January 1903
- Renamed: Triumph
- Fate: Sold to the United Kingdom, 3 December 1903

United Kingdom
- Name: Triumph
- Cost: £957,520
- Completed: June 1904
- Acquired: 3 December 1903
- Commissioned: 21 June 1904
- Fate: Torpedoed and sunk, 25 May 1915

General characteristics
- Class & type: Swiftsure-class pre-dreadnought battleship
- Displacement: 12,175 long tons (12,370 t) (normal load); 13,840 long tons (14,060 t) (deep load)
- Length: 475 ft 3 in (144.9 m) (o/a)
- Beam: 71 ft 1 in (21.7 m)
- Draught: 27 ft 4 in (8.3 m) (deep)
- Installed power: 12 × Yarrow boilers; 12,500 ihp (9,300 kW)
- Propulsion: 2 shafts; 2 triple-expansion steam engines
- Speed: 19 knots (35 km/h; 22 mph)
- Range: 6,210 nmi (11,500 km; 7,150 mi) at 10 knots (19 km/h; 12 mph)
- Crew: 803 (1914)
- Armament: 2 × twin 10 in (250 mm) guns; 14 × single 7.5 in (191 mm) guns; 14 × single 14 pdr (3 in (76 mm)) guns; 4 × single 6 pdr (57 mm (2.2 in)) guns; 2 × single 18 in (450 mm) submerged torpedo tubes
- Armour: Belt: 3–7 in (76–178 mm); Bulkheads: 2–6 in (51–152 mm); Decks: 1–3 in (25–76 mm); Conning tower: 11 in (279 mm); Turrets: 8–10 in (203–254 mm); Barbettes: 2–10 in (51–254 mm); Casemates: 7 in (178 mm)

HMS Triumph, originally known as Libertad, was the second of the two Swiftsure-class pre-dreadnought battleships of the Royal Navy. The ship was ordered by the Chilean Navy, but she was purchased by the United Kingdom as part of ending the Argentine–Chilean naval arms race. Triumph was initially assigned to the Home Fleet and Channel Fleets before being transferred to the Mediterranean Fleet in 1909. The ship briefly rejoined the Home Fleet in 1912 before she was transferred abroad to the China Station in 1913. Triumph participated in the hunt for the German East Asia Squadron of Maximilian Graf von Spee and in the campaign against the German colony at Qingdao, China early in World War I. The ship was transferred to the Mediterranean in early 1915 to participate in the Dardanelles Campaign against the Ottoman Empire. She was torpedoed and sunk off Gaba Tepe by the German submarine U-21 on 25 May 1915.

== Design and description ==
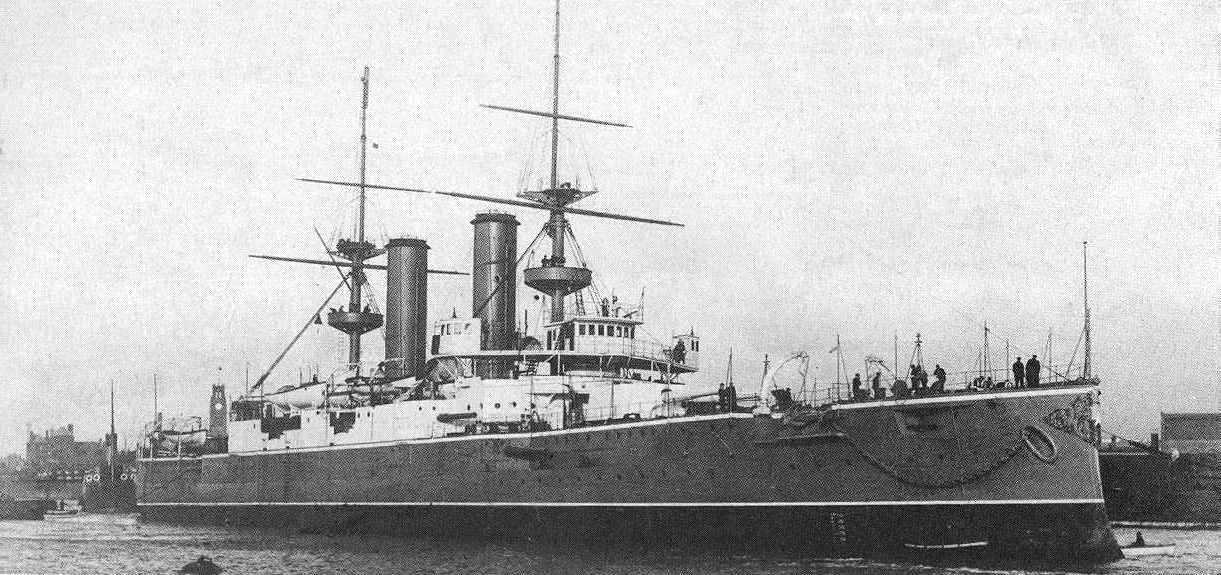
HMS Triumph near completion in January 1904.

Triumph was ordered by Chile, with the name of Libertad, in response to the Argentine purchase of two armoured cruisers from Italy during a time of heightened tensions with Argentina. After the crisis subsided, financial problems forced Chile to put the ship up for sale in early 1903; concerned that Russia might buy them, the United Kingdom stepped in and with financing via merchant bank Antony Gibbs & Sons purchased the still-incomplete ships from Chile on 3 December 1903 for £2,432,000 (£256,000,000 in 2025). The ship was designed to Chilean specifications, particularly the requirement to fit in the graving dock at Talcahuano, and was regarded by the British as a second-class battleship.

=== General characteristics ===
Triumph had an overall length of 475 feet 3 inches (144.9 m), a beam of 71 feet 1 inch (21.7 m), and a draught of 28 feet 6 inches (8.7 m) at deep load. She displaced 12,175 long tons (12,370 t) at standard load and 13,840 long tons (14,060 t) at deep load. At deep load she had a metacentric height of 4.01 feet (1.22 m). In 1906, the crew numbered 729 officers and ratings.

=== Propulsion ===
The ship was powered by two four-cylinder inverted vertical triple-expansion steam engines, each driving one propeller. A dozen Yarrow water-tube boilers provided steam to the engines which produced a total of 12,500 indicated horsepower (9,300 kW) which was intended to allow them to reach a speed of 19.5 knots (36.1 km/h; 22.4 mph). The engines proved to be more powerful than anticipated and Triumph exceeded 20 knots (37 km/h; 23 mph) during sea trials. She carried a maximum of 2,048 long tons (2,081 t) of coal, enough to steam 6,210 nautical miles (11,500 km; 7,150 mi) at 10 knots (19 km/h; 12 mph). In service she and her sister proved to be more economical than first thought with an estimated range of 12,000 nautical miles (22,000 km; 14,000 mi) at 10 knots.

=== Armament ===
The ship was armed with four 45-calibre BL 10-inch (254 mm) Mk VI guns in two twin-gun turrets, one each fore and aft of the superstructure. The guns fired 500-pound (227 kg) projectiles at a muzzle velocity of 2,656 ft/s (810 m/s); this provided a maximum range of 14,800 yards (13,500 m) at the gun's maximum elevation of 13.5°. The firing cycle of the Mk VI guns was claimed to be 15 seconds. Each gun was provided with 90 shells. Triumph's secondary armament consisted of fourteen 50-calibre BL 7.5-inch (191 mm) Mk III guns. Ten of the guns were mounted in a central battery on the main deck; the other four were in casemates abreast the fore- and mainmasts on the upper deck.

A major problem with the guns on the main deck was that they were mounted low in the ship—only about 10 feet (3 m) above water at deep load—and were unusable at high speed or in heavy weather as they dipped their muzzles in the sea when rolling more than 14°. The guns fired 200-pound (91 kg) projectiles at a muzzle velocity of 2,781 ft/s (848 m/s) at a rate of four rounds per minutes. At their maximum elevation of 15° they had a maximum range of about 14,000 yards (13,000 m). The ship carried 150 rounds per gun.

Defence against torpedo boats was provided by fourteen QF 14-pounder Mk I guns, the guns were modified to use the standard 12.5-pound (5.7 kg) shell used by the QF 12 pounder (3-inch) 18 cwt (Note: "cwt" is the abbreviation for hundredweight, 18 cwt referring to the weight of the gun.) gun in British service. They fired 3-inch (76 mm), 12.5-lb projectiles at a muzzle velocity of 2,548 ft/s (777 m/s). Their maximum range and rate of fire is unknown. 200 rounds per gun was carried by Swiftsure. The ship also mounted four QF 6-pounder 57 mm (2.2 in) guns in the fighting tops, although these were removed in 1906–1908. The ship was also armed with a pair of 18-inch (450 mm) submerged torpedo tubes, one on each broadside. She was provided with nine torpedoes.

=== Armour ===
The Swiftsures' armour scheme was roughly comparable to that of the Duncan class. The waterline main belt was composed of Krupp cemented armour (KCA) 7 inches (178 mm) thick. It was 8 feet (2.4 m) high of which 5 feet 3 inches (1.6 m) was below the waterline at normal load. Fore and aft of the 2–6-inch (51–152 mm) oblique bulkheads that connected the belt armour to the barbettes, the belt continued, but was reduced in thickness. It was six inches thick abreast the barbettes, but was reduced to two inches fore and aft of the barbettes. It continued forward to the bow and supported the ship's spur-type ram. It continued aft to the steering gear compartment and terminated in a 3-inch (76 mm) transverse bulkhead. The upper strake of 7-inch armour covered the ship's side between the rear of the barbettes up to the level of the upper deck. The upper deck casemates were also protected by 7-inch faces and sides, but were enclosed by rear 3-inch plates. The 7.5-inch guns on the main deck were separated by 1-inch (25 mm) screens with .5 inches (12.7 mm) plating protecting the funnel uptakes to their rear. A longitudinal 1-inch bulkhead divided the battery down its centreline.

The turret faces were 9 inches (229 mm) thick and their sides and rear were 8 inches (203 mm) thick. Their roofs were two inches thick and the sighting hood protecting the gunners was 1.5 inches (38 mm) thick. Above the upper deck the barbettes were 10 inches thick on their faces and eight inches on the rear. Below this level they thinned to three and two inches respectively. The conning tower was protected by 11 inches (279 mm) of armour on its face and eight inches on its rear. The deck armour inside the central citadel ranged from 1 to 1.5 inches in thickness. Outside the citadel, the lower deck was three inches thick and sloped to meet the lower side of the belt armour.

== Construction and service ==
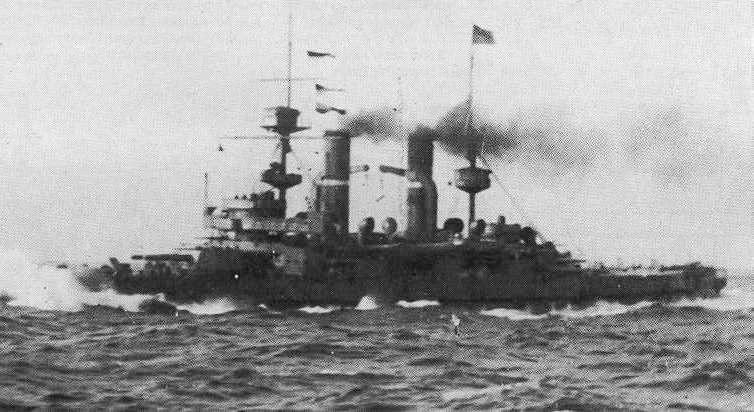
Triumph on maneuvers in 1908

=== Pre–World War I ===
HMS Triumph was ordered by Chile as Libertad and laid down by Vickers, Sons & Maxim at Barrow-in-Furness on 26 February 1902 and launched on 15 January 1903, when she was named by Mme de Gana, wife of the Chilean Minister Plenipotentiary to the United Kingdom. She was completed in June 1904 and commissioned at Chatham Dockyard on 21 June 1904 for service in the Home Fleet. On 17 September 1904 the ship was struck by SS Siren off Pembroke Dock and was only slightly damaged. Under a fleet reorganization in January 1905, the Home Fleet became the Channel Fleet. She collided with her sister ship Swiftsure on 3 June 1905 and suffered damage to her bow. Triumph received a brief refit at Chatham Dockyard in October 1908 and was transferred to the Mediterranean Fleet on 26 April 1909. The ship returned to the Home Fleet in May 1912. She was transferred to the China Station on 28 August 1913 and was placed in reserve at Hong Kong until mobilized in August 1914 at the beginning of World War I.

=== World War I ===
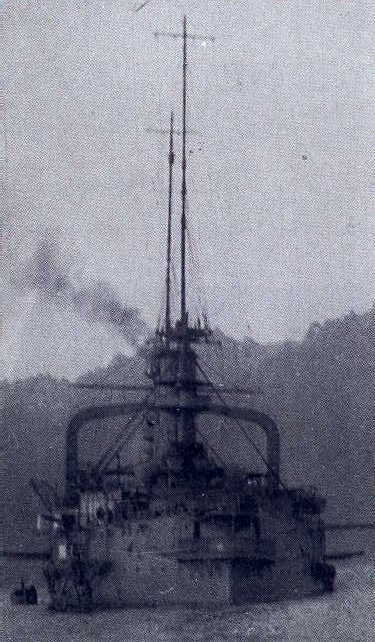
Triumph firing at German positions at Qingdao, China, in October 1914

Triumph was recommissioned using the crews of demobilised river gunboats, supplemented with two officers, 100 ratings, and six signallers from the Duke of Cornwall's Light Infantry, and was ready for sea on 6 August 1914. Triumph took part in operations off the German colony of Qingdao, China in early August 1914, with the intention of stopping German shipping entering or returning to the port. Triumph, together with the French cruiser Dupleix, captured the German merchant ship Senegambia, laden with coal and cattle, on the morning of 21 August, with Dupliex then chasing and eventually capturing a second merchant ship, the C. Ferd Laeiz. On the evening of 21 August, Triumph captured the German merchant ship Frisia, also carrying coal and cattle. On 23 August 1914, she was attached to the Imperial Japanese Navy's Second Fleet, and after disembarking her Army volunteers at Weihai, participated in the campaign against the German colony at Qingdao. In September, Triumph, together with the destroyer Usk, escorted a convoy carrying British troops for operations against Qingdao, with Triumph taking part in several bombardments of German positions until the capture of Qingdao by the Japanese. Triumph was hit by a German shell during a bombardment on 14 October, damaging a mast, and killing one crewman and wounding two more. With Qingdao in Japanese hands, Triumph returned to Hong Kong for a refit on 19 November 1914.

Upon completion of her refit in January 1915, Triumph was transferred to the Dardanelles for service in the Dardanelles Campaign. The ship departed Hong Kong on 12 January and stopped at Suez from 7 February to 12 February before moving on to join the Dardanelles Squadron. Triumph took part in the opening attack on the entrance forts on 18 February and 19 February, and joined the predreadnoughts Albion and Cornwallis in using her secondary battery to silence the fort at Sedd el Bahr on 25 February. She, Albion, and Majestic were the first Allied battleships to enter the Turkish Straits during the campaign when they carried out the initial attack on the inner forts on 26 February. She also took part in the attack on Fort Dardanos on 2 March 1915. She and Swiftsure were detached from the Dardanelles on 5 March for operations against forts at Smyrna, returning to the Dardanelles on 9 March.

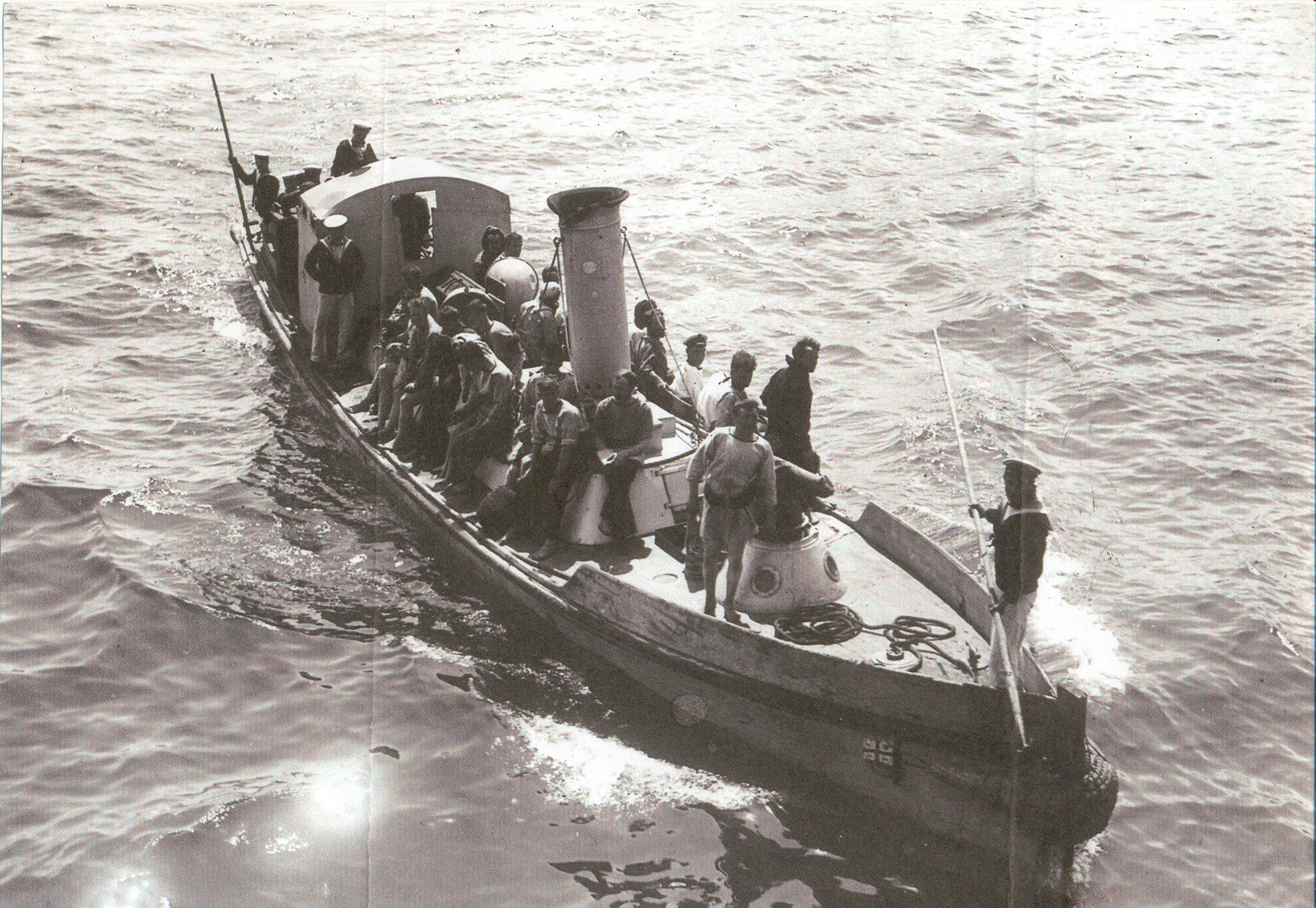
HMS Triumph's picket boat returning to the battleship after the E15 expedition.

Triumph participated in the main attack on the Narrows forts on 18 March, and fired on Ottoman trenches at Achi Baba on 15 April. On the night of 18 April, one of her picket boats and one from Majestic, both armed with torpedoes mounted in dropping gear, attacked the British submarine E15, which had stranded beneath Fort Dardanos and was being salvaged by German and Ottoman forces; a torpedo from the Majestic boat destroyed the submarine. Triumph supported the main landing by the Anzac forces at Gaba Tepe on 25 April, and continued to support them through May.

=== Loss ===
On 25 May 1915, Triumph was underway off Gaba Tepe, firing on Ottoman positions, with torpedo nets out and most watertight doors shut, when she sighted a submarine periscope 300 to 400 yards (270 to 370 m) off her starboard beam at about 1230 hours. It belonged to the U-boat U-21 under the command of Lieutenant Otto Hersing. Triumph opened fire on the periscope, but was almost immediately struck by a torpedo, which easily cut through her torpedo net, on her starboard side. A tremendous explosion resulted, and Triumph took on a list 10° to starboard. She held that list for about five minutes, then it increased to 30°. The destroyer Chelmer evacuated most of her crew before she capsized ten minutes later. She remained afloat upside down for about 30 minutes, then began to sink slowly in about 180 feet (55 m) of water. Three officers and 75 ratings died in her sinking.

== Dive site ==
In October 2021, Turkey opened the Gallipoli Historic Underwater Park, an underwater museum off Çanakkale accessible to scuba divers. The park includes a number of wrecks from vessels sunk during the Dardanelles and Gallipoli campaigns, including Triumph and the battleship Majestic.
