= Pacts of May =

1902 treaties between Chile and Argentina

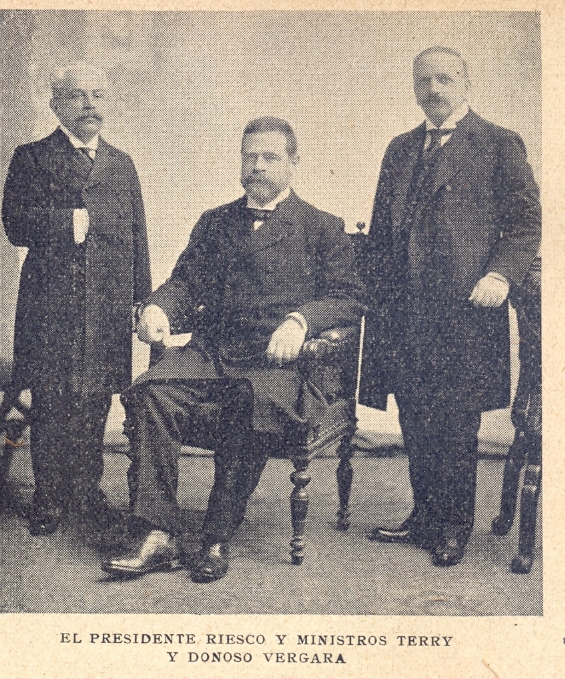
President Germán Riesco and Ministers Terry and Donoso Vergara (1903). Argentine Foreign Minister José A. Terry returns to Argentina after signing a peace treaty with Chile.

The Pacts of May (Spanish: Pactos de Mayo) are four protocols signed in Santiago de Chile by Chile and Argentina on 28 May 1902 in order to extend their relations and resolve its territorial disputes. The disputes had led both countries to increase their military budgets and run an arms race in the 1890s.

1. - Acta Preliminar: Argentina renounces the ability to intervene in the Chilean affairs in the Pacific Ocean

2. - Tratado general de Arbitraje: Frames contract to define how to resolve territorial controversies

3. - Convención sobre Limitación de Armamentos Navales: The most famous of the protocols is the arms control treaty. It states that Chile and Argentina will sell off warships they had under construction in Europe and the disarmament of some ships already in service. As a consequence of territorial disputes both countries had begun to increase their military budgets and an arms race ensued in the 1890s. Of longer-lasting importance, the pact resolved the power projection competition by assigning each country a sphere of influence: Chile in the Pacific and Argentina in the Atlantic and Rio de la Plata. According to Rizzo Romano, it is the first arms control pact.

4. - Agreement: to ask Edward VII of the United Kingdom the demarcation ad hoc of his award of 1902.

During the Beagle Channel Arbitration Argentina brought forward the argument that the Pactos de Mayo implied a demarcation clause between both countries: Chile at the Pacific and Argentina at the Atlantic. Chile denied the argument, saying that the pacts are not a border treaty and therefore no place is named as limit between the Pacific and the Atlantic. Argentina still maintains that Cape Horn is the limit between the two oceans.

== See also ==
- Beagle conflict
- Hague Conventions of 1899 and 1907
- South American dreadnought race
- Argentine–Chilean naval arms race
- 1902 Arbitral award of the Andes between Argentina and Chile

== Bibliography ==
- Joseph S. Tulchin, Francisco Rojas Aravena, Ralph H. Espach, "Strategic Balance and Confidence Building Measures in the Americas", Stanford University Press, 1998, ISBN 0-8047-3608-1, ISBN 978-0-8047-3608-4, 199 Pages
- Los pactos de Mayo de 1902 in Spanish Language
- El debate sobre los pactos de Mayo en la política interna argentina in Spanish Language
- Trabajo de investigación histórica enviado por su autor, Sr. Carlos A. Manus como colaboración a Histarmar with the text of the Pactos, in Spanish Language
