= Sternwalk =

Balcony on the stern of a ship

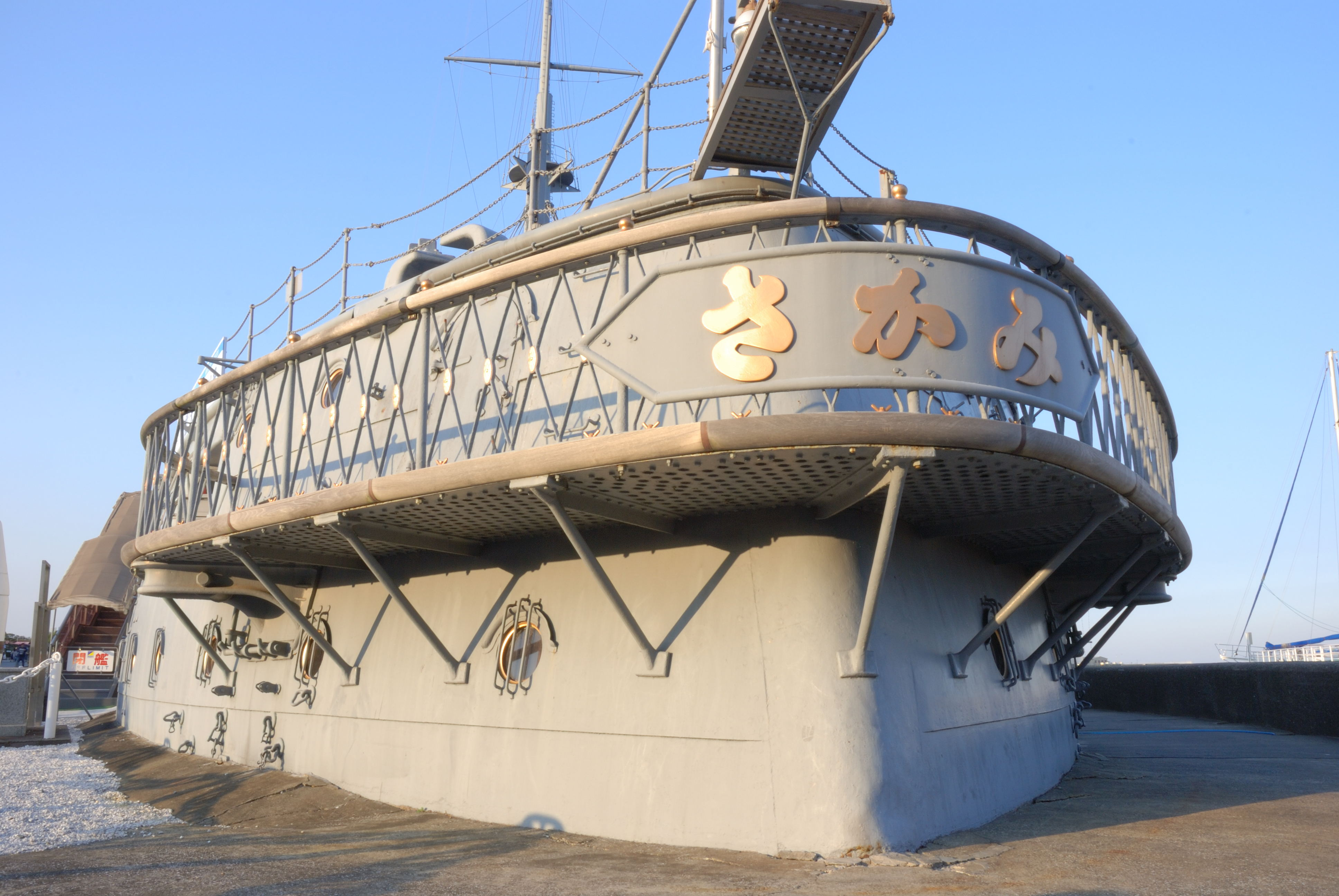
Sternwalk of the Japanese pre-dreadnought battleship Mikasa

A sternwalk (also stylised as stern walk and stern-walk) is a balcony on the outside of the hull on the stern of a ship, usually reserved for the highest-ranking officer on board. They became less common on warships in the twentieth century.

The Japanese battleship Ise is thought to be the last ship with a sternwalk as part of its design. It was launched in November 1916.
