= Kabatepe =

Coordinates: 40°12′23″N 26°16′06″E

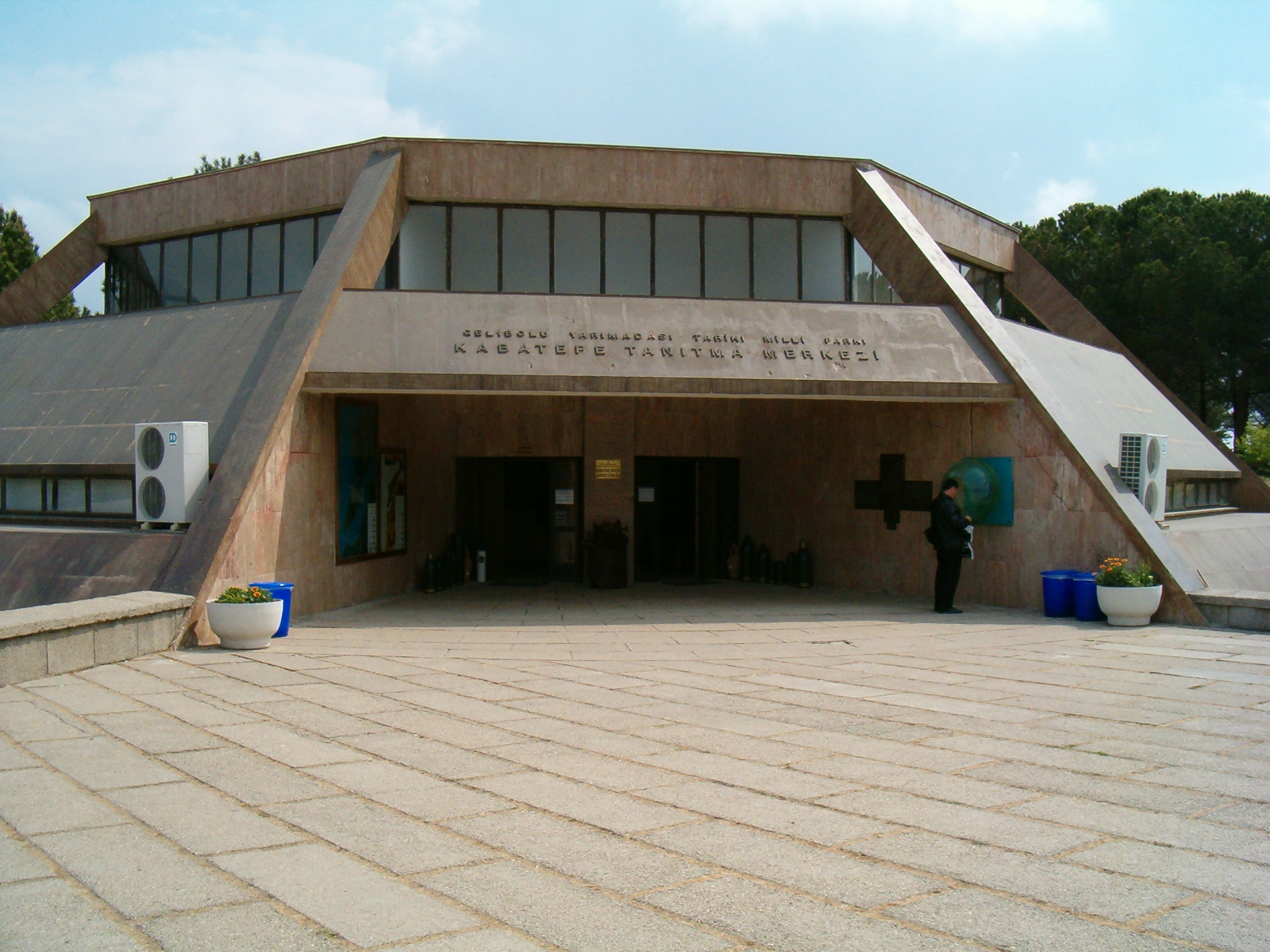
Kabatepe Museum, 2006

Kabatepe, or Gaba Tepe, is a headland overlooking the northern Aegean Sea in what is now the Gallipoli Peninsula National Historical Park (tr), on the Gallipoli peninsula in northwestern Turkey.

During the First World War, the headland was the site of an Ottoman artillery battery, known as "Beachy Bill," which constantly harassed the ANZAC troops around ANZAC Cove to the north throughout the Gallipoli Campaign.

== Kabatepe Museum ==
A French infantry rifle from World War I in the museum

The Kabatepe Museum (in Turkish Kabatepe Müzesi) is located within the Gallipoli Peninsula National Historical Park. It commemorates the Gallipoli Campaign, now considered a defining moment in the modern history of not only Turkey, but of Australia and New Zealand as well.

The museum hosts numerous relics from the campaign, including weapons, ammunition, uniforms, photographs, letters written by the soldiers to their families, and private belongings such as shaving tools, cocoa cases, leather flasks etc. There are also more shocking artifacts such as the skull of a Turkish soldier killed by a bullet to the forehead, and a soldier's shoe still containing a bone from the owner's foot.
