= Italian destroyer Nembo =

Nembo was the name of at least two ships of the Italian Navy and may refer to:

- Italian destroyer Nembo (1901), a Nembo-class destroyer launched in 1901 and sunk in 1916
- Italian destroyer Nembo (1927), a Turbine-class destroyer launched in 1927 and sunk in 1940
