= SMS Lika =

Austro-Hungarian Tatra-class destroyer

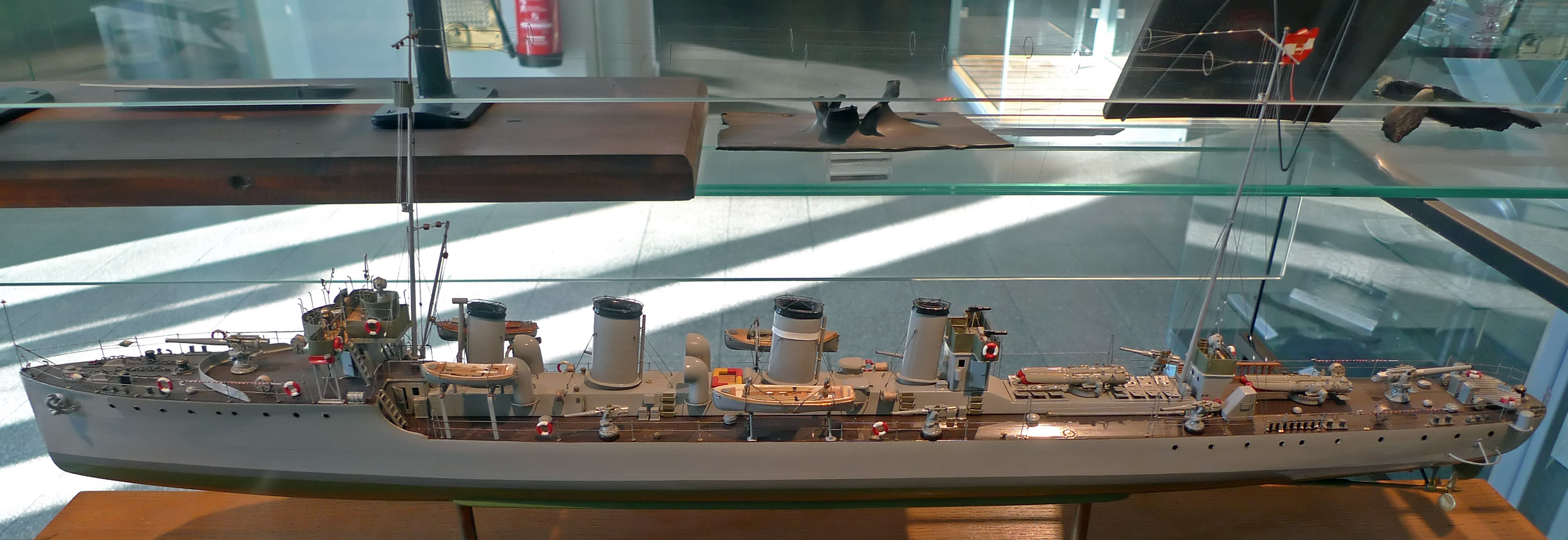
- A model of sister ship SMS Tátra in the Heeresgeschichtliches Museum Wien

History

Austria-Hungary
- Name: Lika
- Builder: Ganz-Danubius, Porto Ré, Kingdom of Croatia-Slavonia, Austro-Hungarian Empire
- Laid down: 30 April 1912
- Launched: 15 March 1913
- Completed: 8 August 1914
- Fate: Sunk by mine, 29 December 1915

General characteristics
- Class & type: Tátra-class destroyer
- Displacement: 870 long tons (880 t) (normal); 1,050 long tons (1,070 t) (deep load)
- Length: 83.5 m (273 ft 11 in) (o/a)
- Beam: 7.8 m (25 ft 7 in)
- Draft: 3 m (9 ft 10 in) (deep load)
- Installed power: 6 × Yarrow boilers; 20,600 shp (15,400 kW)
- Propulsion: 2 × shafts; 2 × steam turbines
- Speed: 32.5 knots (60.2 km/h; 37.4 mph)
- Range: 1,600 nmi (3,000 km; 1,800 mi) at 12 knots (22 km/h; 14 mph)
- Complement: 105
- Armament: 2 × single 10 cm (3.9 in) guns; 6 × single 66 mm (2.6 in) guns; 2 × twin 45 cm (17.7 in) torpedo tubes

SMS Lika (Note: "SMS" stands for "Seiner Majestät Schiff", or "His Majesty's Ship".) was one of six Tátra-class destroyers built for the kaiserliche und königliche Kriegsmarine (Austro-Hungarian Navy) shortly before the First World War. Completed in August 1914, she helped to sink an Italian destroyer during the action off Vieste in May 1915 after Italy declared war on Austria-Hungary. Two months later the ship participated in an unsuccessful attempt to recapture a small island in the Central Adriatic Sea from the Italians. In November and early December Lika was one of the ships conducting raids off the Albanian coast to interdict the supply lines between Italy and Albania. The ship was sunk in Durazzo harbor during the early stages of the 1st Battle of Durazzo in late December after striking several mines.

== Design and description ==
The Tátra-class destroyers were faster, more powerfully armed and more than twice as large as the preceding Huszár class. The ships had an overall length of 83.5 meters (273 ft 11 in), a beam of 7.8 meters (25 ft 7 in), and a maximum draft of 3 meters (9 ft 10 in). They displaced 870 long tons (880 t) at normal load and 1,050 long tons (1,070 t) at deep load. The ships had a complement of 105 officers and enlisted men.

The Tátras were powered by two AEG-Curtiss steam turbine sets, each driving a single propeller shaft using steam provided by six Yarrow boilers. Four of the boilers were oil-fired while the remaining pair used coal. The turbines, designed to produce 20,600 shaft horsepower (15,400 kW), were intended to give the ships a speed of 32.5 knots (60.2 km/h; 37.4 mph). The ships carried enough oil and coal to give them a range of 1,600 nautical miles (3,000 km; 1,800 mi) at 12 knots (22 km/h; 14 mph).

The main armament of the Tátra-class destroyers consisted of two 50-caliber Škoda Works 10-centimeter (3.9 in) K10 guns, one each fore and aft of the superstructure in single mounts. Their secondary armament consisted of six 45-caliber 66-millimeter (2.6 in) guns, two of which were on anti-aircraft mountings. They were also equipped with four 450-millimeter (17.7 in) torpedo tubes in two twin rotating mountings amidships.

== Construction and career ==
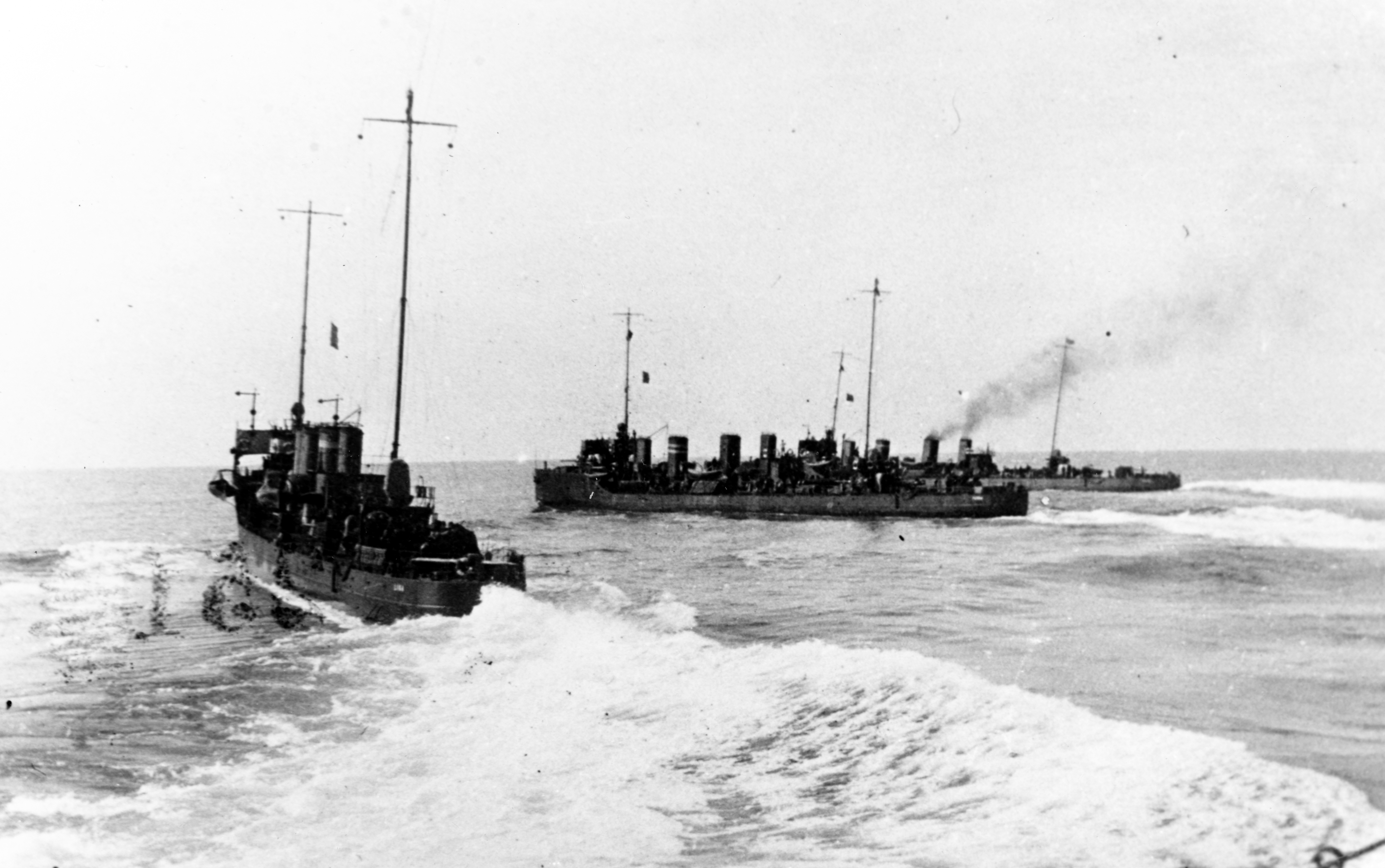
Three Tátra-class destroyers on maneuvers circa 1914; Lika on the left and Tátra in the center.

Lika was laid down by Ganz-Danubius at their shipyard in Porto Ré in the Kingdom of Croatia-Slavonia of the Austro-Hungarian Empire on 30 April 1912, launched on 15 March 1913 and completed on 8 August 1914. The Tátra-class ships did not play a significant role in the minor raids and skirmishing in the Adriatic in 1914 and early 1915 between the Entente Cordiale and the Central Powers.

=== Action off Vieste ===
The Kingdom of Italy signed a secret treaty in London in late April 1915 breaking its alliance with the German Empire and Austro-Hungary and promising to declare war on the Central Powers within a month. Austro-Hungarian intelligence discovered this and Admiral Anton Haus, commander of the Austro-Hungarian Navy, planned a massive surprise attack on Italian ports and facilities on the Northern Adriatic coast, outside of interception range of the modern ships of the Royal Italian Navy stationed at Taranto. To warn of any Italian warships able to interfere with the bombardments, Haus prepositioned three groups of destroyers, each led by a scout cruiser. Placed in the Central Adriatic between the island of Pelagosa and the Italian coast, four days prior to the Italian declaration of war on 23 May, were four Tátra-class destroyers, including Lika, and the cruiser SMS Helgoland. Around midnight on the night of 23/24 May, Haus ordered the reconnaissance groups to move west and attack Italian coastal targets. About an hour later the four Tátras encountered a pair of Italian Nembo-class destroyers, Turbine and Aquilone, but they were believed by the Italians to be friendly ships in the darkness.

The Italian ships separated when Aquilone went to investigate a sighting; Helgoland began bombarding the city of Barletta at 04:00 and the Italian destroyer spotted the cruiser at 04:38. The ship turned away to the southeast and was able to disengage without any damage. Turbine, however, encountered Helgoland several minutes later and believed that she was an Italian ship until she was disabused by a salvo from the cruiser. The destroyer turned to the north, towards Vieste, to escape, with Helgoland and the destroyer SMS Orjen in pursuit. Alerted by Helgoland's commander, Linienschiffskapitän (Captain) Heinrich Seitz, the destroyers SMS Csepel and SMS Tátra, which had been bombarding Manfredonia, moved to intercept and spotted Turbine at 05:10, opening fire at 05:45. Lika, which had been bombarding Vieste, was ordered to block her escape to the north while Helgoland stayed to the east to cut off her access to the Adriatic. Lika scored the critical hit of the battle when one of her 66-millimeter shells broke Turbine's steam pipe and caused her to rapidly lose speed. Tátra and Helgoland also scored hits and Turbine was dead in the water with a list when her crew abandoned ship at 06:51. She had hit Tátra and Csepel during the engagement, but failed to inflict any significant damage. The Austro-Hungarians rescued 35 survivors before torpedoing the derelict. As they were withdrawing they were engaged by the protected cruiser Italian cruiser Libia and the armed merchant cruiser SS Cittá di Siracusa between 07:10 and 07:19. Helgoland was struck by one shell before they were able to disengage from the slower ships.

On 28 July, all six Tátra-class ships and the scout cruisers SMS Saida and Helgoland, reinforced by the German submarine UB-14, attempted to recapture Pelagosa which had been occupied by the Italians on 11 July. Despite a heavy bombardment by the ships, the 108-man landing party was unable to overcome the 90-man garrison and was forced to withdraw. Three weeks later, Saida, Helgoland, Lika, Orjen and two other destroyers bombarded the island, destroying its freshwater cistern, which forced the Italians to withdraw on 18 August.

The Bulgarian declaration of war on Serbia on 14 October cut the existing supply line from Serbia to Salonika, Greece, and forced the Allies to begin supplying Serbia through ports in Albania. This took about a month to work out the details and the Austro-Hungarians took just about as long to decide on a response. Haus ordered Seitz to take Helgoland, Saida and all six Tátra-class destroyers on a reconnaissance mission off the Albanian coast on the night of 22/23 November. They encountered and sank a small cargo ship and a motor schooner carrying flour for Serbia; four Italian destroyers were unable to intercept them before they reached friendly territory. Haus was initially reluctant to send his ships so far south, but an order from the Armeeoberkommando (High Command) on 29 November to patrol the Albanian coast and to disrupt Allied troop movements caused him to transfer Helgoland, her sister SMS Novara and the Tátra-class ships to Cattaro. On 6 December, Helgoland and the Tátras swept down the coast to Durazzo, sinking five motor schooners, including two in Durazzo harbor.

=== 1st Battle of Durazzo ===
Austro-Hungarian aircraft spotted a pair of Italian destroyers in Durazzo harbor on 28 December and Haus dispatched Seitz to take Helgoland, Tátra, Csepel, Lika and their sisters SMS Triglav and SMS Balaton south and search the area between Durazzo and Brindisi for them. If they were not found he was to arrive at Durazzo at dawn and destroy any ships found there. Seitz's ships sailed later that day and sank the French submarine Monge at 02:35. He was unable to find the destroyers and dutifully arrived off Durazzo at dawn. At 07:30 he ordered four of his destroyers into the harbor to sink the cargo ship and two schooners anchored there while Helgoland engaged the coastal artillery defending the port. A well-camouflaged 75-millimeter (3 in) artillery battery opened fire at 08:00 at point-blank range. While maneuvering to avoid its fire, Lika and Triglav entered a minefield. After striking two mines in quick succession, Lika sank at 08:03 and Triglav was crippled when her boiler rooms flooded after hitting one mine. Tátra rescued the ship's executive officer and 33 seamen after she sank.

== Bibliography ==
- Bilzer, Franz F. (1990). Die Torpedoschiffe und Zerstörer der k.u.k. Kriegsmarine 1867–1918. Graz: H. Weishaupt. ISBN 3-9003-1066-1.
- Cernuschi, Enrico & O'Hara, Vincent (2015). "The Naval War in the Adriatic Part 1: 1914–1916". In Jordan, John (ed.). Warship 2015. London: Conway. pp. 161–173. ISBN 978-1-84486-276-4.
- Greger, René (1976). Austro-Hungarian Warships of World War I. London: Ian Allan. ISBN 0-7110-0623-7.
- Halpern, Paul G. (1994). A Naval History of World War I. Annapolis, Maryland: Naval Institute Press. ISBN 1-55750-352-4.
- Noppen, Ryan K. (2016). Austro-Hungarian Cruisers and Destroyers 1914-18. New Vanguard. Vol. 241. Oxford, UK: Osprey Publishing. ISBN 978-1-4728-1470-8.
- O'Hara, Vincent P. & Heinz, Leonard R. (2017). Clash of Fleets: Naval Battles of the Great War, 1914-18. Annapolis, Maryland: Naval Institute Press. ISBN 978-1-68247-008-4.
- Sieche, Erwin (1985). "Austria-Hungary". In Gardiner, Robert & Gray, Randal (eds.). Conway's All the World's Fighting Ships 1906–1921. Annapolis, Maryland: Naval Institute Press. ISBN 0-85177-245-5.
