= SMS Csepel =

Austro-Hungarian Tatra-class destroyer

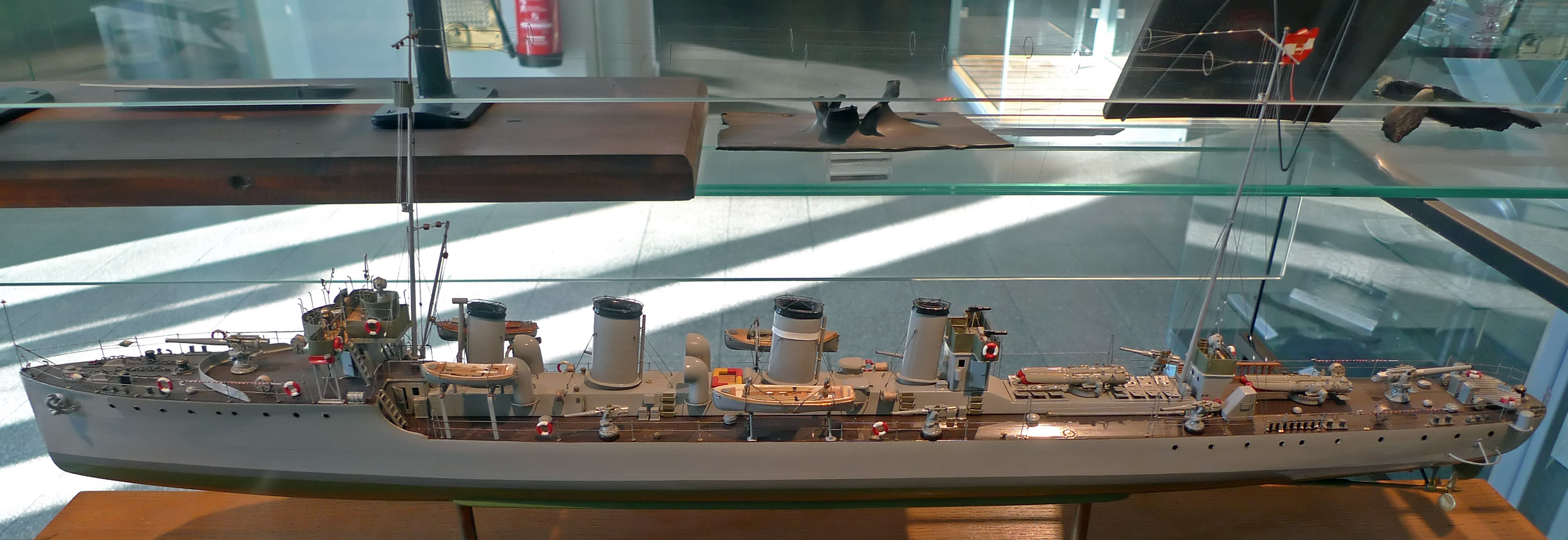
- A model of sister ship SMS Tátra in the Heeresgeschichtliches Museum Wien

History

Austria-Hungary
- Name: Csepel
- Builder: Ganz-Danubius, Porto Ré, Kingdom of Croatia-Slavonia, Austro-Hungarian Empire
- Laid down: 9 January 1912
- Launched: 30 December 1912
- Completed: 29 December 1913
- Fate: Ceded to Italy, January 1920

Kingdom of Italy
- Acquired: January 1920
- Renamed: Muggia, 26 September 1920
- Fate: Wrecked, 25 March 1929

General characteristics
- Class & type: Tátra-class destroyer
- Displacement: 870 long tons (880 t) (normal); 1,050 long tons (1,070 t) (deep load)
- Length: 83.5 m (273 ft 11 in) (o/a)
- Beam: 7.8 m (25 ft 7 in)
- Draft: 3 m (9 ft 10 in) (deep load)
- Installed power: 6 × Yarrow boilers; 20,600 shp (15,400 kW)
- Propulsion: 2 × shafts; 2 × steam turbines
- Speed: 32.5 knots (60.2 km/h; 37.4 mph)
- Range: 1,600 nmi (3,000 km; 1,800 mi) at 12 knots (22 km/h; 14 mph)
- Complement: 105
- Armament: 2 × single 10 cm (3.9 in) guns; 6 × single 66 mm (2.6 in) guns; 2 × twin 45 cm (17.7 in) torpedo tubes

SMS Csepel (Note: "SMS" stands for "Seiner Majestät Schiff", or "His Majesty's Ship".) was one of six Tátra-class destroyers built for the kaiserliche und königliche Kriegsmarine (Austro-Hungarian Navy) shortly before the First World War. Completed in 1913, she helped to sink an Italian destroyer during the action off Vieste in May 1915 after Italy declared war on Austria-Hungary. Two months later the ship participated in an unsuccessful attempt to recapture a small island in the central Adriatic Sea from the Italians. In November and early December Csepel was one of the ships conducting raids off the Albanian coast to interdict the supply lines between Italy and Albania. She was hit one time during the First Battle of Durazzo in late December. Her stern was blown off by a French submarine in early 1916 and her repairs were not completed until early 1917.

Csepel participated in several unsuccessful raids on the Otranto Barrage in 1917, although she sank an Italian destroyer during the Battle of the Strait of Otranto. During the action of 22 April 1918 in the Strait of Otranto, the ship helped to damage a pair of British destroyers. She was transferred to Italy in 1920 in accordance with the peace treaties ending the war and renamed Muggia. The Regia Marina (Royal Italian Navy) transferred her to the Far East in 1927 where she ran aground and was wrecked during a typhoon two years later.

== Design and description ==
The Tátra-class destroyers were faster, more powerfully armed and more than twice as large as the preceding Huszár class. The ships had an overall length of 83.5 meters (273 ft 11 in), a beam of 7.8 meters (25 ft 7 in), and a maximum draft of 3 meters (9 ft 10 in). They displaced 870 long tons (880 t) at normal load and 1,050 long tons (1,070 t) at deep load. The ships had a complement of 105 officers and enlisted men.

The Tátras were powered by two AEG-Curtiss steam turbine sets, each driving a single propeller shaft using steam provided by six Yarrow boilers. Four of the boilers were oil-fired while the remaining pair used coal. The turbines, designed to produce 20,600 shaft horsepower (15,400 kW), were intended to give the ships a speed of 32.5 knots (60.2 km/h; 37.4 mph). The ships carried enough oil and coal to give them a range of 1,600 nautical miles (3,000 km; 1,800 mi) at 12 knots (22 km/h; 14 mph).

The main armament of the Tátra-class destroyers consisted of two 50-caliber Škoda Works 10-centimeter (3.9 in) K10 guns, one each fore and aft of the superstructure in single, unprotected mounts. Their secondary armament consisted of six 45-caliber 66-millimeter (2.6 in) guns, two of which were on anti-aircraft mountings. They were also equipped with four 450-millimeter (17.7 in) torpedo tubes in two twin rotating mountings amidships.

== Construction and career ==
Csepel was laid down by Ganz-Danubius at their shipyard in Porto Ré in the Kingdom of Croatia-Slavonia of the Austro-Hungarian Empire on 9 January 1912, launched on 30 December 1912 and completed on 29 December 1913. The Tátra-class ships did not play a significant role in the minor raids and skirmishing in the Adriatic in 1914 and early 1915 between the Entente Cordiale and the Central Powers. On 13 August 1914, Csepel rescued 76 survivors and pulled 18 bodies from the water from the Austro-Hungarian passenger ship SS Baron Gautsch after it had blundered into a minefield and sunk. The destroyer had her propeller shaft bearings replaced from 9 to 12 May 1915.

=== Action off Vieste ===
The Kingdom of Italy signed a secret treaty in London in late April 1915 breaking its alliance with the German Empire and Austro-Hungary and promising to declare war on the Central Powers within a month. Austro-Hungarian intelligence discovered this and Admiral Anton Haus, commander of the Austro-Hungarian Navy, planned a massive surprise attack on Italian ports and facilities on the northern Adriatic coast, outside of interception range of the modern ships of the Regia Marina stationed at Taranto. To warn of any Italian warships able to interfere with the bombardments, Haus prepositioned three groups of destroyers, each led by a scout cruiser. Placed in the central Adriatic between the island of Pelagosa and the Italian coast, four days prior to the Italian declaration of war on 23 May, were four Tátra-class destroyers, including Csepel, and the cruiser SMS Helgoland. Around midnight on the night of 23/24 May, Haus ordered the reconnaissance groups to move west and attack Italian coastal targets. About an hour later the four Tátras encountered a pair of Italian Nembo-class destroyers, Turbine and Aquilone, but in the darkness they were believed by the Italians to be friendly ships.

The Italian ships separated when Aquilone went to investigate a sighting; Helgoland began bombarding the city of Barletta at 04:00 and the Italian destroyer spotted the cruiser at 04:38. Aquilone turned away to the southeast and was able to disengage without any damage. Turbine, however, encountered Helgoland several minutes later and believed that she was an Italian ship until she was disabused by a salvo from the cruiser. The destroyer turned to the north, towards Vieste, to escape, with Helgoland and the destroyer SMS Orjen in pursuit. Alerted by Helgoland's commander, Linienschiffskapitän (Captain) Heinrich Seitz, the destroyers Csepel and SMS Tátra, which had been bombarding Manfredonia, moved to intercept and spotted Turbine at 05:10, opening fire at 05:45. SMS Lika, which had been bombarding Vieste, was ordered to block her escape to the north while Helgoland stayed to the east to cut off her access to the Adriatic. Lika scored the critical hit of the battle when one of her 66-millimeter shells broke Turbine's steam pipe and caused her to rapidly lose speed. Tátra and Helgoland also scored hits and Turbine was dead in the water with a list when her crew abandoned ship at 06:51. She had hit Tátra and Csepel during the engagement, but failed to inflict any significant damage. The Austro-Hungarians rescued 35 survivors before torpedoing the derelict ship. As they were withdrawing they were engaged by the protected cruiser Libia and the armed merchant cruiser SS Cittá di Siracusa between 07:10 and 07:19. Helgoland was struck by one shell before they were able to disengage from the slower ships.

On 23 July Helgoland and her sister SMS Saida, escorted by Csepel, Tátra, their sister SMS Balaton and three other destroyers bombarded the towns of Termoli, Ortona and San Benedetto del Tronto while a landing party cut the telegraph cable in Tremiti. Five days later, all six Tátra-class ships and the same pair of cruisers, reinforced by the German submarine UB-14, attempted to recapture Pelagosa. Despite a heavy bombardment by the ships, the 108-man landing party was unable to overcome the 90-man garrison and was forced to withdraw.

The Bulgarian declaration of war on Serbia on 14 October cut the existing supply line from Serbia to Salonika, Greece, and forced the Allies to begin supplying Serbia through ports in Albania. This took about a month to work out the details and the Austro-Hungarians took just about as long to decide on a response. Haus ordered Seitz to take Helgoland, Saida and all six Tátra-class destroyers on a reconnaissance mission off the Albanian coast on the night of 22/23 November. They encountered and sank a small cargo ship and a motor schooner carrying flour for Serbia; four Italian destroyers were unable to intercept them before they reached friendly territory. Haus was initially reluctant to send his ships so far south, but an order from the Armeeoberkommando (High Command) on 29 November to patrol the Albanian coast and to disrupt Allied troop movements caused him to transfer Helgoland, her sister SMS Novara and the Tátra-class ships to Cattaro. On 6 December, Helgoland and the Tátras swept down the coast to Durazzo, sinking five motor schooners, including two in Durazzo harbor.

=== First Battle of Durazzo ===
Austro-Hungarian aircraft spotted a pair of Italian destroyers in Durazzo harbor on 28 December and Haus dispatched Seitz to take Helgoland, Tátra, Csepel, Lika, Balaton and their sister SMS Triglav south and search the area between Durazzo and Brindisi for them. If they were not found he was to arrive at Durazzo at dawn and destroy any ships found there. Seitz's ships sailed later that day and sank the French submarine Monge at 02:35; Csepel rescued seven survivors. He was unable to find the destroyers and dutifully arrived off Durazzo at dawn. At 07:30 he ordered four of his destroyers into the harbor to sink the cargo ship and two schooners anchored there while Helgoland engaged the coastal artillery defending the port. A well-camouflaged 75-millimeter (3 in) artillery battery opened fire at 08:00 at point-blank range. While maneuvering to avoid its fire, Lika and Triglav entered a minefield. After striking two mines in quick succession, Lika sank at 08:03 and Triglav was crippled when her boiler rooms flooded after hitting one mine. After she was maneuvered out of the minefield, Csepel attempted to pass a towline, but it got tangled in one of her own propellers, badly damaging it and limited her to 20 knots (37 km/h; 23 mph). Tátra was finally successful in securing a tow at 09:30, but was limited to a speed of six knots (11 km/h; 6.9 mph) when Seitz led his ships northwards. He radioed for assistance at 10:35 and was informed an hour later that the armored cruiser SMS Kaiser Karl VI and four torpedo boats were en route to support him.

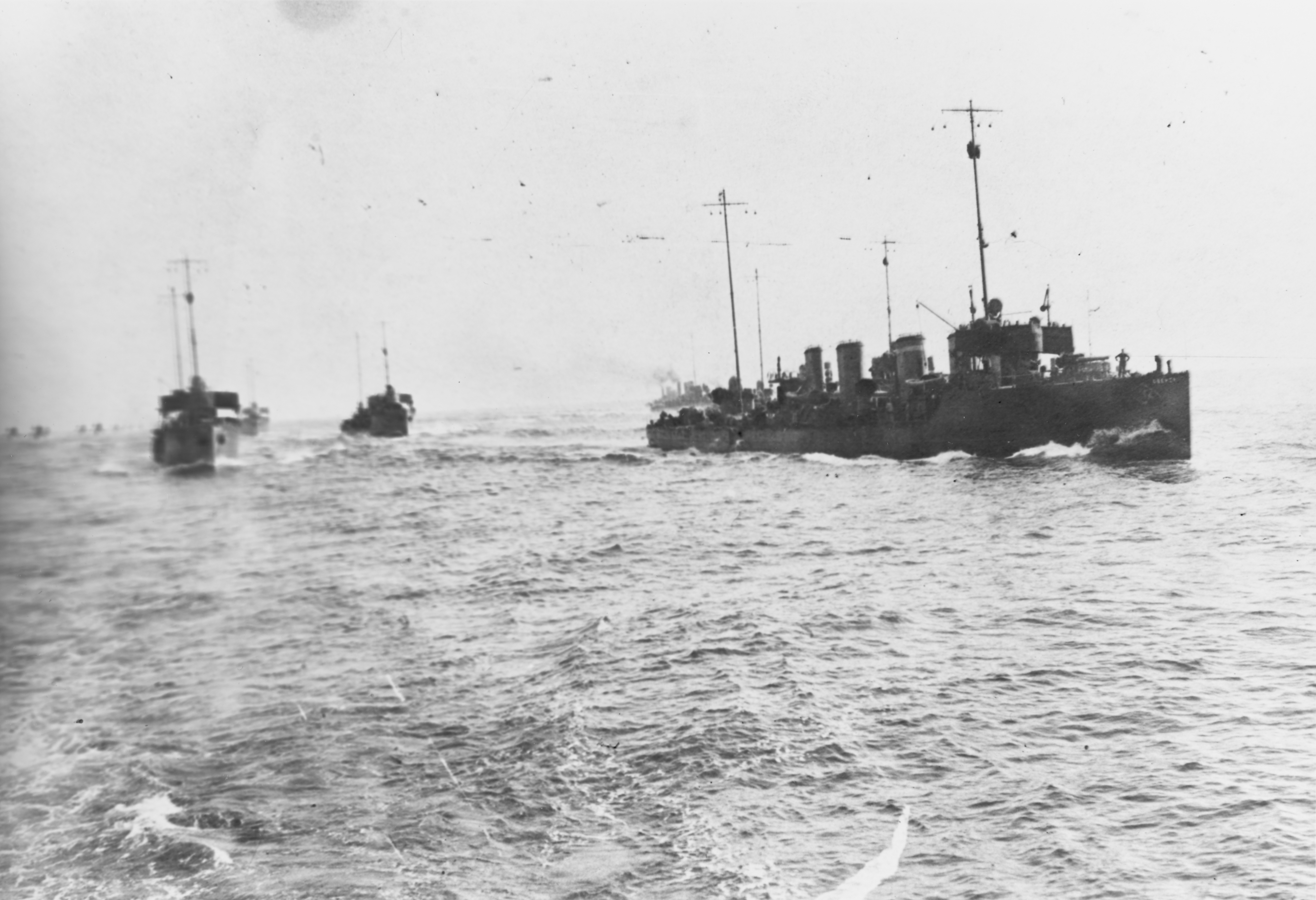
Csepel on the right, followed by Balaton and Tátra, returning after the 1st Battle of Durazzo, 30 December 1915

Italian observers had spotted Seitz's ships at 07:00 and the Allied quick-reaction force of the British light cruiser HMS Dartmouth, commanded by Captain Percy Addison, and the Italian scout cruiser Quarto, escorted by five French destroyers, sortied in an attempt to cut off the Austro-Hungarian ships from their base at Cattaro. These were followed two hours later by the Italian scout cruiser Nino Bixio, the British light cruiser HMS Weymouth and four Italian destroyers. Seitz ordered Triglav to be abandoned at 13:15 once the smoke from these ships had been spotted and for Csepel to turn to the south then southwest while the main body briefly covered her before turning southwest themselves. The French destroyers were ordered to deal with Triglav at 13:38 while the cruisers pursued Seitz's ships.

Quarto's captain initially positioned his ship in trail behind Dartmouth, thinking to cut-off Csepel, but Addison ordered Quarto to fall in on Dartmouth's port quarter around 14:15, away from Csepel. He ordered the Italian ship to pursue Csepel fifteen minutes later, but by then the destroyer had increased her speed to 26 knots (48 km/h; 30 mph). Quarto opened fire at a range of 8,000 meters (8,750 yd) at 14:40 and the Austro-Hungarian ship started zigzagging to throw off Quarto's fire. She only fired 23 times by 15:08 and managed to hit Csepel once, inflicting little damage. The destroyer managed to rejoin Seitz's main body about 16:45 and the Austro-Hungarians were able to disengage before reaching the Italian coast when darkness fell around 17:30.

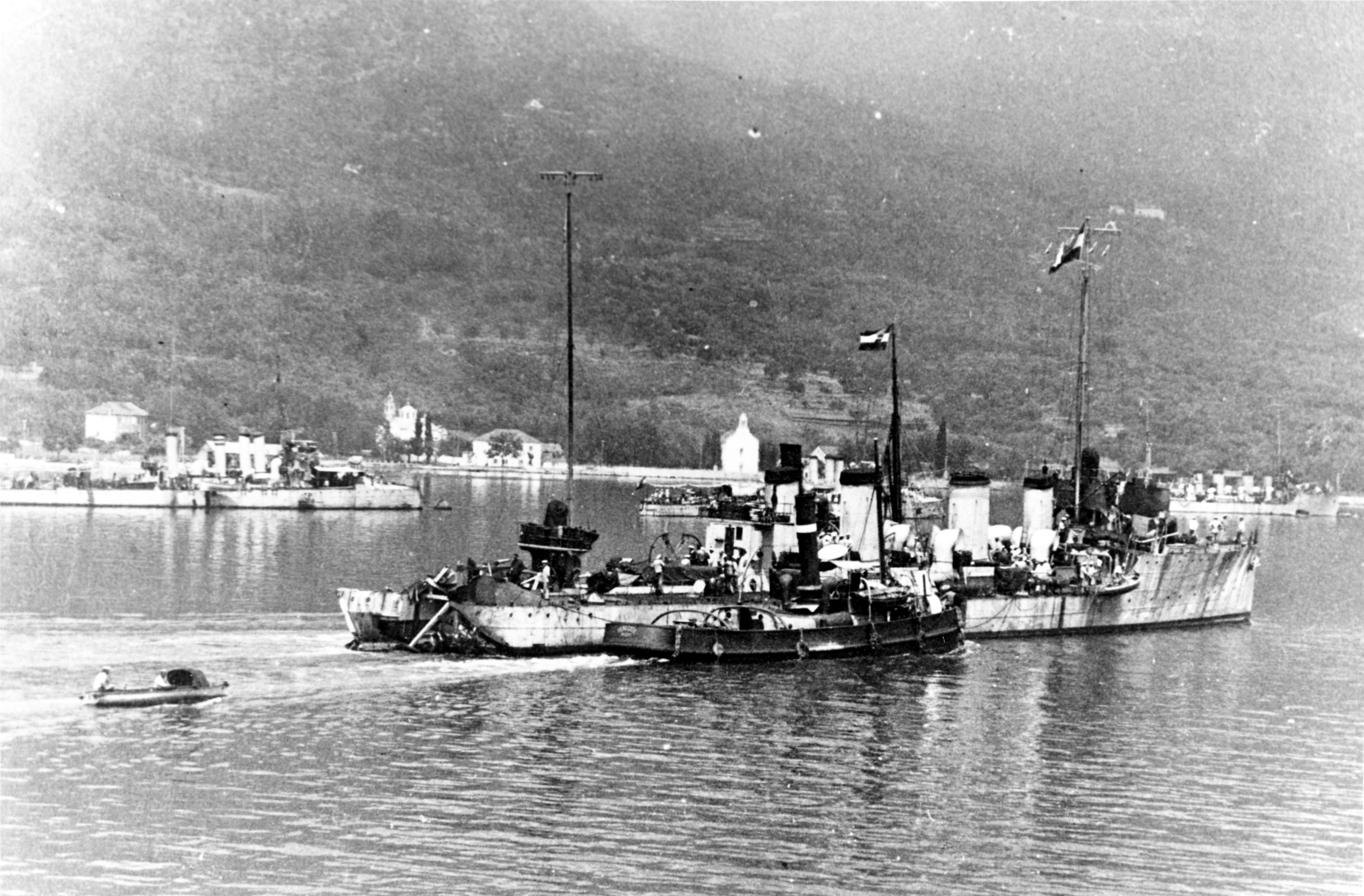
Csepel being towed into Cattaro on 4 May 1916 after being torpedoed

On 27 January 1916, Novara, Csepel and Orjen departed Cattaro on a mission to attack the shipping in Durazzo harbor. En route the two sisters accidentally collided with each other and had to return to port although the cruiser continued the mission. Csepel was under repair until 21 April. On 4 May, the French submarine Bernoulli torpedoed the destroyer off Cattaro and blew off her stern. She was towed to port for emergency repairs and was then towed to Fiume for permanent repairs on 13–16 May. On 3 June, Csepel was moved to Porto Ré where she was fitted with a replacement stern taken from one of the Ersatz Triglav-class under construction. After working up, the ship returned to Cattaro on 31 October. On the night of 11/12 March 1917, Balaton, Orjen, Csepel and Tátra swept through the Strait of Otranto, but failed to sink the French cargo ship SS Gorgone that they encountered.

=== Battle of the Strait of Otranto ===
On the night of 14/15 May, Balaton and Csepel departed Cattaro with orders to search off the Albanian coast and the Strait of Otranto for Allied shipping. They were intended to act as a diversion for the attack by the three Novara-class scout cruisers on the Otranto Barrage. The destroyers encountered a convoy of three merchant ships, escorted by the Italian destroyer Borea, at 03:10. Csepel lit up Borea with her searchlight at 03:24 and opened fire immediately afterward, hitting the Italian ship four times in rapid succession. One of the hits broke her main steam pipe which caused her to slow to a stop and the others set her on fire; she sank shortly before dawn. Balaton fired at the 1,657 gross register tons (GRT) SS Carroccio which blew up when her cargo of ammunition exploded. The destroyers engaged the other two ships, setting one on fire and slightly damaging the other one, after which they disengaged and headed north at 25 knots (46 km/h; 29 mph).

Italian observers reported this action at 03:48 and the patrolling Italian scout cruiser Carlo Mirabello and her escorting trio of French destroyers were alerted at 04:35 and turned south to intercept. They did not spot the Austro-Hungarian ships, but another group of Allied ships did at 07:45. This group consisted of two British light cruisers, the brand-new Italian scout cruiser Aquila and four Italian destroyers under the command of Rear Admiral Alfredo Acton. He ordered Aquila and the destroyers to investigate five minutes later as the Austro-Hungarian ships turned away towards Durazzo. The scout cruiser was the fastest ship in the Italian fleet and she opened fire at 08:15 at a range of 11,400 meters (12,500 yd) while closing the range to 9,600 meters (10,500 yd) before Csepel hit her once at 08:32; severing her main steam line, killing seven men and causing her to lose power. The destroyers continued the pursuit, but broke off when shells from Durazzo's coastal artillery began dropping around them about 09:05. After the Italian ships moved to rejoin Acton's force at 09:18, Balaton and Csepel turned towards Cattaro, evading an attack by Bernoulli en route. During the battle, Csepel fired 127 rounds from her main guns, 78 shells from her secondary armament and two torpedoes.

Helgoland and all of the Tátras attempted to duplicate the success of the earlier raid on 18–19 October, but they were spotted by Italian aircraft and turned back in the face of substantial Allied reinforcements alerted by the aircraft. On the night of 13 December, Csepel, Tátra and Balaton raided the Otranto Barrage, but disengaged after firing torpedoes at what they believed to be four Allied destroyers, although there is no record of any attacks that night in Allied records.

The smaller ships in the Austro-Hungarian Navy were the most active ones and their crews had the highest morale; most of the larger ships did little but swing on their moorings which did nothing to improve the morale of their crews. On 1 February, the Cattaro Mutiny broke out, starting aboard the armored cruiser Sankt Georg. The mutineers rapidly gained control of Kaiser Karl VI and most of the other major warships in the harbor. Unhappy with the failure of the smaller ships' crews to join the mutiny, the mutineers threatened to fire at any ship that failed to hoist a red flag. Csepel's crew hoisted a flag with the permission of her captain with the proviso that there should be no disturbances aboard ship. The following day, many of the mutinous ships abandoned the effort after coast-defense guns loyal to the government opened fire on the rebel guard ship Kronprinz Erzherzog Rudolf. The scout cruisers and Csepel, among other ships, took advantage of the confusion to rejoin loyalist forces in the inner harbor where they were protected by coastal artillery. The next morning, the Erzherzog Karl-class battleships arrived from Pola and put down the uprising. The destroyer was refitted in Pola from 7 to 20 April.

=== Action of 22 April 1918 ===
On the night of 22–23 April 1918, Csepel and all four Ersatz Tátra-class destroyers attempted to intercept Allied shipping in the Strait of Otranto. They were spotted by the pair of British destroyers, Jackal and Hornet, which were patrolling the western side of the Strait. The British ships altered course to intercept them. At a range of about 2,700 meters (3,000 yd) the leading Austrian destroyer opened fire. The British ships reversed course and began laying a smoke screen hoping to lure the Austrians further south. The Austrians began hitting their targets quickly with Jackal slightly damaged by three hits, but Hornet was badly damaged by hits that caused a fire and subsequent explosion in her forward magazine and jammed her steering so that she began turning circles. Their return fire was ineffective, but the Austrians disengaged after about 15 minutes, pursued by Jackal. The other four destroyers of the patrol had steamed towards the battle and they joined the pursuit for a couple of hours before turning away about 20 nautical miles (37 km; 23 mi) from Cattaro. Csepel received an extensive refit from 13 June to 7 October in Pola. She returned to Cattaro the following day, but was back in Pola by the war's end.

=== End of the war ===
By October it had become clear that Austria-Hungary was facing defeat in the war. With various attempts to quell nationalist sentiments failing, Emperor Karl I decided to sever Austria-Hungary's alliance with Germany and appeal to the Allies in an attempt to preserve the empire from complete collapse. On 26 October Austria-Hungary informed Germany that their alliance was over. At the same time, the Austro-Hungarian Navy was in the process of tearing itself apart along ethnic and nationalist lines. Vice Admiral Miklós Horthy was informed on the morning of 28 October that an armistice was imminent, and used this news to maintain order and prevent a mutiny among the fleet. While a mutiny was spared, tensions remained high and morale was at an all-time low.

The following day the National Council in Zagreb announced Croatia's dynastic ties to Hungary had come to an end. This new provisional government, while throwing off Hungarian rule, had not yet declared independence from Austria-Hungary. Thus Emperor Karl I's government in Vienna asked the newly formed State of Slovenes, Croats and Serbs for help maintaining the fleet stationed at Pola and keeping order among the navy. The National Council refused to assist unless the Austro-Hungarian Navy was first placed under its command. Emperor Karl I, still attempting to save the Empire from collapse, agreed to the transfer, provided that the other "nations" which made up Austria-Hungary would be able to claim their fair share of the value of the fleet at a later time. All sailors not of Slovene, Croatian, Bosnian, or Serbian background were placed on leave for the time being, while the officers were given the choice of joining the new navy or retiring.

The Austro-Hungarian government thus decided to hand over the bulk of its fleet, preferring to do that rather than give the fleet to the Allies, as the new state had declared its neutrality. Furthermore, the newly formed state had also not yet publicly repudiated Emperor Karl I, keeping the possibility of reforming the Empire into a triple monarchy alive.

=== Post-war ===
On 3 November the Austro-Hungarian government signed the Armistice of Villa Giusti with Italy, ending the fighting along the Italian Front, although it refused to recognize the transfer of Austria-Hungary's warships. As a result, on 4 November, Italian ships sailed into the ports of Trieste, Pola, and Fiume and Italian troops occupied the naval installations at Pola the following day. The National Council did not order any men to resist the Italians, but they also condemned Italy's actions as illegitimate. On 9 November, all remaining ships in Pola harbour had the Italian flag raised. At a conference at Corfu, the Allies agreed the transfer could not be accepted, despite sympathy from the United Kingdom. Faced with the prospect of being given an ultimatum to surrender the former Austro-Hungarian warships, the National Council agreed to hand over the ships beginning on 10 November. When the Allies divided up the Austro-Hungarian Fleet amongst themselves in January 1920, Csepel was awarded to Italy. She was commissioned in the Regia Marina with the name Muggia on 26 September and transferred to Shanghai, China, in March 1927. The ship ran aground and was wrecked on the Finger Rocks near Hea Chu Island near Amoy, in dense fog and darkness, or during a typhoon, on 25 March 1929. The 77 survivors were rescued from rocks by the Japanese oiler Matsumoto Maru after the fog lifted on 26 March.

== Bibliography ==
- Bilzer, Franz F. (1990). Die Torpedoschiffe und Zerstörer der k.u.k. Kriegsmarine 1867–1918. Graz: H. Weishaupt. ISBN 3-9003-1066-1.
- Cernuschi, Enrico & O'Hara, Vincent (2015). "The Naval War in the Adriatic Part 1: 1914–1916". In Jordan, John (ed.). Warship 2015. London: Conway. pp. 161–173. ISBN 978-1-84486-276-4.
- Cernuschi, Enrico & O'Hara, Vincent (2016). "The Naval War in the Adriatic, Part 2: 1917–1918". In Jordan, John (ed.). Warship 2016. London: Conway. pp. 62–75. ISBN 978-1-84486-326-6.
- Greger, René (1976). Austro-Hungarian Warships of World War I. London: Ian Allan. ISBN 0-7110-0623-7.
- Halpern, Paul G. (2004). The Battle of the Otranto Straits: Controlling the Gateway to the Adriatic in World War I. Bloomington, Indiana: Indiana University Press. ISBN 0-253-34379-8.
- Halpern, Paul G. (1994). A Naval History of World War I. Annapolis, Maryland: Naval Institute Press. ISBN 1-55750-352-4.
- Noppen, Ryan K. (2016). Austro-Hungarian Cruisers and Destroyers 1914-18. New Vanguard. Vol. 241. Oxford, UK: Osprey Publishing. ISBN 978-1-4728-1470-8.
- O'Hara, Vincent P. & Heinz, Leonard R. (2017). Clash of Fleets: Naval Battles of the Great War, 1914-18. Annapolis, Maryland: Naval Institute Press. ISBN 978-1-68247-008-4.
- Sieche, Erwin (1985). "Austria-Hungary". In Gardiner, Robert & Gray, Randal (eds.). Conway's All the World's Fighting Ships 1906–1921. Annapolis, Maryland: Naval Institute Press. ISBN 0-85177-245-5.
- Sieche, Erwin F. (1985). "Zeittafel der Vorgange rund um die Auflosung und Ubergabe der k.u.k. Kriegsmarine 1918–1923". Marine—Gestern, Heute (in German). 12 (1): 129–141. OCLC 648103394.
- Sokol, Anthony (1968). The Imperial and Royal Austro-Hungarian Navy. Annapolis, Maryland: United States Naval Institute. OCLC 462208412.
- Sondhaus, Lawrence (1994). The Naval Policy of Austria-Hungary, 1867–1918: Navalism, Industrial Development, and the Politics of Dualism. West Lafayette, Indiana: Purdue University Press. ISBN 978-1-55753-034-9.
