= Italian destroyer Espero (1904) =

Italian Nembo-class destroyer

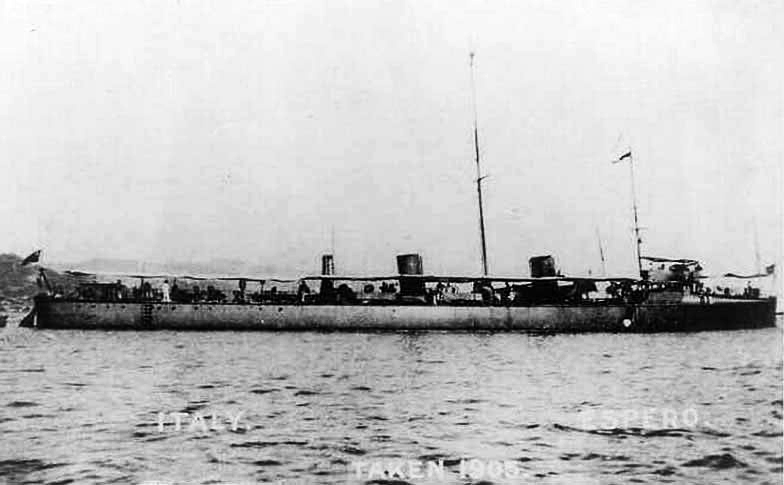
- Espero in 1905 in her original two-funnel configuration.

History

Kingdom of Italy
- Name: Espero
- Namesake: Hesperus, the personification of the "evening star" (the planet Venus) in Greek mythology
- Builder: Cantiere Pattison, Naples, Kingdom of Italy
- Launched: 9 July 1904
- Completed: 1 April 1905
- Commissioned: April 1905
- Stricken: January 1921
- Reinstated: 16 January 1921
- Renamed: Turbine 16 January 1921
- Reclassified: Torpedo boat July 1921
- Stricken: April 1923
- Fate: Scrapped

General characteristics
- Type: Destroyer
- Displacement: 325 long tons (330 t) normal; 380 long tons (390 t) full load
- Length: 63.39 m (208 ft 0 in) pp; 64.00 m (210 ft 0 in) oa
- Beam: 5.94 m (19 ft 6 in)
- Draught: 2.29 m (7 ft 6 in)
- Propulsion: 2 × vertical triple-expansion steam engines; 3× Thornycroft boilers; 5,000 ihp (3,728 kW)
- Speed: 30 knots (56 km/h; 35 mph)
- Complement: 55
- Armament: As built: 5 × QF 6 pounder Nordenfelt 57 mm/43 guns; 3 × 356 mm (14 in) torpedo tubes; 1 × 356 mm (14 in) bow torpedo tube; 1912: 4 × Cannon 76/40 (3 in) Model 1916 guns; 2 x 450 mm (17.7 in) torpedo tubes; 1921: 3 × Cannon 76/40 (3 in) Model 1916 guns; 2 x 450 mm (17.7 in) torpedo tubes; 1 x Colt Browning 65mm/80 machine gun

Espero ("Hesperus") was an Italian Nembo-class destroyer. Commissioned into service in the Italian Regia Marina (Royal Navy) in 1905, she served in World War I, playing an active role in the Adriatic campaign. In the aftermath of the Impresa di Fiume of 1919, she played a role in the defense of the Free State of Fiume against Italy in 1920. Renamed Turbine and reclassified as a torpedo boat in 1921, she was stricken in 1923.

== Construction, commissioning, and modernization ==
Espero was laid down at the Cantiere Pattison (English: Pattison Shipyard) in Naples, Italy, and launched on 9 July 1904 and completed on 1 April 1905. She was commissioned in April 1905.

At various times between 1909 and 1912, each of the Nembo-class destroyers underwent a radical modernization; Espero′s took place in 1912. Her coal-fired boilers were converted into oil-fired ones, and her original two short, squat funnels were replaced with three smaller, more streamlined ones, profoundly altering her appearance. Her armament also changed, with her original five QF 6 pounder Nordenfelt 57 mm/43 guns replaced by four Cannon 76/40 (3 in) Model 1916 guns, and her original four 356-millimetre (14 in) torpedo tubes replaced by two 450-millimetre (17.7 in) tubes. Sometime between 1914 and 1918, Espero underwent additional modifications in which minelaying equipment was installed aboard her.

== Service history ==
=== World War I ===
World War I broke out in 1914, and the Kingdom of Italy entered the war on the side of the Allies with its declaration of war on Austria-Hungary on 23 May 1915. At the time, Espero, under the command of Capitano di corvetta (Corvette Captain) Bellavita, as well as her sister ships Aquilone, Borea, Nembo, and Turbine made up the 5th Destroyer Squadron, based at Taranto. During the night of 23–24 May 1915 — the first night of Italy's participation in the war — Espero towed the submarine Velella across the Adriatic Sea to the coast of Austria-Hungary so that Velella could lay in ambush off the major Austro-Hungarian Navy base at Cattaro.

At 19:00 on 8 June 1916 Espero departed Vlorë (known to the Italians as Valona) in the Principality of Albania with the protected cruiser Libia and the destroyers Impavido, Insidioso, and Pontiere to escort the armed merchant cruiser Principe Umberto and the troopship Romagna, which together had embarked the 2,605 men of the Italian Royal Army′s (Regio Esercito′s) 55th Infantry Regiment for transportation to Italy. The convoy had traveled only a short distance when the Austro-Hungarian submarine U-5 hit Principe Umberto in the stern with two torpedoes. Principe Umberto sank in a few minutes about 15 nautical miles (28 km; 17 mi) southwest of Cape Linguetta with the loss of 1,926 of the 2,821 men on board, the worst naval disaster of World War I in terms of lives lost. The escorting warships rescued the survivors but could not locate and counterattack U-5.

Espero continued her World War I service without taking part in any other significant actions. By late October 1918, Austria-Hungary had effectively disintegrated, and the Armistice of Villa Giusti, signed on 3 November 1918, went into effect on 4 November 1918 and brought hostilities between Austria-Hungary and the Allies to an end. World War I ended a week later with an armistice between the Allies and the German Empire on 11 November 1918.

=== Fiume ===
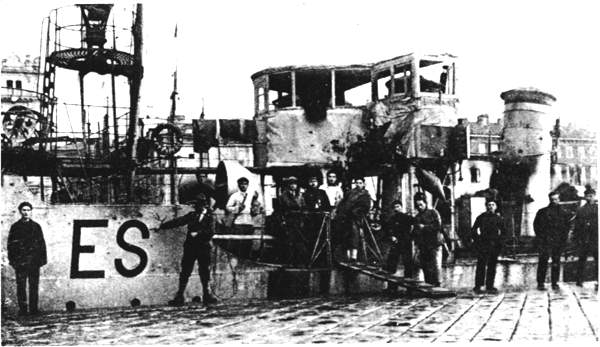
Espero at Fiume in December 1920. Note damage to her bridge.

Before Italy entered World War I, it had made a pact with the Allies, the Treaty of London of 1915, in which it was promised all of the Austrian Littoral, but not the city of Fiume (known in Croatian as Rijeka). After the war, at the Paris Peace Conference in 1919, this delineation of territory was confirmed, with Fiume remaining outside of Italy's borders and amalgamated into the Kingdom of the Serbs, Croats and Slovenes (which in 1929 would be renamed the Kingdom of Yugoslavia). Opposing this outcome, the poet and Italian nationalist Gabriele D'Annunzio led a force of about 2,600 so-called "legionaries" to Fiume and seized the city in September 1919 in what became known as the Impresa di Fiume ("Fiume endeavor" or "Fiume enterprise"). The Italian government opposed D'Annunzio's move, and in response D'Annunzio declared Fiume to be the Italian Regency of Carnaro in September 1920. Relations between Italy and D'Annunzio's government continued to deteriorate, and after Italy signed the Treaty of Rapallo with the Kingdom of the Serbs, Croats, and Slovenes in November 1920, making Fiume an independent state as the Free State of Fiume rather than incorporating it into Italy, D'Annunzio declared war on Italy.

At the time, Espero was serving in the Adriatic Sea on escort duty on the shipping route between Šibenik (known to the Italians as Sebenico) and Trieste. She switched to D'Annunzio's side and arrived at Fiume on 8 December 1920 to support him. Italy launched a full-scale invasion of Fiume on 24 December 1920, beginning what became known as the Bloody Christmas. The Italian battleship Andrea Doria fired on Espero on 26 December, inflicting serious damage on her and setting her on fire, and one of the men killed during the Bloody Christmas was a member of her crew.

The Bloody Christmas fighting ended on 29 December 1920 in D'Annunzio's defeat and the establishment of the Free State of Fiume. In January 1921, Espero arrived at Pula for repairs and modifications. Like other Italian ships which had supported D'Annunzio, she was disarmed and briefly stricken from the naval register.

=== Later service ===
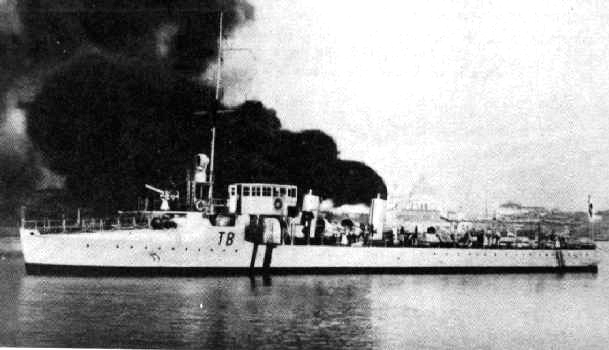
The ship as the torpedo boat Turbine sometime between 1921 and 1923.

Espero was reinstated on 16 January 1921 with the name Turbine, the name previously held by her sister ship Turbine, which Austro-Hungarian ships had sunk on 24 May 1915. After completion of her repairs and modifications — which included the removal of one 76-millimetre gun and the installation of a Colt Browning 65-millimeter/80-caliber antiaircraft machine gun — Turbine returned to operations in June 1921. Reclassified as a torpedo boat in July 1921, she again was stricken from the naval register in 1923 and subsequently scrapped.
