= Italian destroyer Borea (1902) =

Italian Nembo-class destroyer

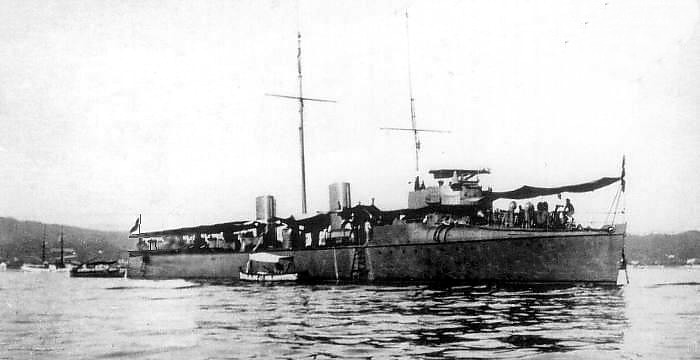
- Borea in 1914.

History

Kingdom of Italy
- Name: Borea
- Namesake: Boreas, a god in Greek mythology who personifies the north wind
- Builder: Cantiere Pattison, Naples, Kingdom of Italy
- Laid down: 2 October 1899
- Launched: 12 December 1902
- Completed: 6 October 1903
- Commissioned: 1903
- Fate: Sunk 15 May 1917

General characteristics
- Type: Destroyer
- Displacement: 325 long tons (330 t) normal; 380 long tons (390 t) full load
- Length: 63.39 m (208 ft 0 in) pp; 64.00 m (210 ft 0 in) oa
- Beam: 5.94 m (19 ft 6 in)
- Draught: 2.29 m (7 ft 6 in)
- Propulsion: 2 × vertical triple-expansion steam engines; 3× Thornycroft boilers; 5,000 ihp (3,728 kW)
- Speed: 30 knots (56 km/h; 35 mph)
- Complement: 55
- Armament: As built: 5 × QF 6 pounder Nordenfelt 57 mm/43 guns; 3 × 356 mm (14 in) torpedo tubes; 1 × 356 mm (14 in) bow torpedo tube; 1910: 4 × Cannon 76/40 (3 in) Model 1916 guns; 2 x 450 mm (17.7 in) torpedo tubes

Borea ("Boreas") was an Italian Nembo-class destroyer. Commissioned into service in the Italian Regia Marina (Royal Navy) in 1903, she served in the Italo-Turkish War and World War I, playing an active role in the Adriatic campaign until she was sunk in 1917 during the Battle of the Strait of Otranto.

== Construction, commissioning, and modernization ==
Borea was laid down at the Cantiere Pattison (English: Pattison Shipyard) in Naples, Italy, on 2 October 1899. She was launched on 12 December 1902 and completed on 6 October 1903. She was commissioned in 1903.

At various times between 1909 and 1912, each of the Nembo-class destroyers underwent a radical modernization; Borea′s took place in 1910. Her coal-fired boilers were converted into oil-fired ones, and her original two short, squat funnels were replaced with three smaller, more streamlined ones, profoundly altering her appearance. Her armament also changed, with her original five QF 6 pounder Nordenfelt 57 mm/43 guns replaced by four Cannon 76/40 (3 in) Model 1916 guns, and her original four 356-millimetre (14 in) torpedo tubes replaced by two 450-millimetre (17.7 in) tubes. Sometime between 1914 and 1917, Borea underwent additional modifications in which minelaying equipment was installed aboard her.

== Service history ==
=== Italo-Turkish War ===
The Italo-Turkish War began on 29 September 1911 with the Kingdom of Italy′s declaration of war on the Ottoman Empire. Nembo was assigned at the time to the 2nd Squadron's 4th Division along with her sister ships Aquilone, Nembo, and Turbine when the war broke out. On 12 July 1912 she deployed to the Aegean Sea, where at 04:00 on 14 July 1912, she got underway from Stampalia in the Dodecanese with Borea and the armored cruiser Vettor Pisani to provide support to the torpedo boats Astore, Centauro, Climene, Perseo, and Spica as they conducted a reconnaissance of the Dardanelles. The ships first steamed to the Italian-occupied island of Leros in the southern Aegean Sea, where the torpedo boats were prepared for the incursion. They then proceeded to Strati (also known as Bozaba), where they arrived on 17 July 1912 and the officer who would command the torpedo boats during the operation joined the force. Delayed by bad weather, the force left Strati on the afternoon of 18 July bound for the Dardanelles. While Borea, Vettor Pisani, and Nembo remained off the coast out of sight of land, the torpedo boats penetrated the Dardanelles, noting the location of Ottoman ships and the defenses of the strait. Suffering only slight damage and no casualties, the torpedo boats returned to Vettor Pisani during the predawn hours of 19 July 1912. The war ended on 18 October 1912 in an Italian victory.

=== World War I ===
==== 1915 ====
World War I broke out in 1914, and the Kingdom of Italy entered the war on the side of the Allies with its declaration of war on Austria-Hungary on 23 May 1915. At the time, Borea, under the command of Capitano di corvetta (Corvette Captain) Pontremoli, as well as Aquilone, Nembo, Turbine, and their sister ship Espero made up the 5th Destroyer Squadron, based at Taranto. On the night of 23–24 May 1915, the first night of Italy's participation in the war, Borea towed the submarine Nereide across the Adriatic Sea to the coast of Austria-Hungary so that Nereide could lay in ambush off the major Austro-Hungarian Navy base at Cattaro.

On the afternoon of 6 December 1915 Borea, now under the command of Capitano di corvetta (Corvette Captain) Arese, the protected cruiser Quarto, the scout cruiser Guglielmo Pepe, the auxiliary cruiser Città di Catania, the minelayers Minerva and Partenope, and the destroyers Francesco Nullo, Giuseppe Cesare Abba, and Ippolito Nievo got underway from Taranto to escort a convoy consisting of the troopships America, Cordova, Dante Alighieri, and Indiana and the military transport Benghazi carrying 400 officers, 6,300 non-commissioned officers and soldiers, and 1,200 horses from Italy to Vlorë (known to the Italians as Valona) in the Principality of Albania. The convoy reached Vlorë at 08:00 on 7 December 1915.

==== 1916 ====
In October 1916 Borea, Nembo, the destroyers Ascaro and Garibaldino, and four torpedo boats provided protection and support to a landing force consisting of the armored cruiser Francesco Ferruccio and the steamers Ausonia, Bulgaria, Choising, and Polcevera sent to occupy Sarandë (known to the Italians as Santi Quaranta), in Albania. At 05:15 on 2 October 1916, four platoons of sailors, a unit of miners, and a unit of personnel from Francesco Ferruccio landed on the beach and quickly occupied the area, the 32 members of the Greek garrison at Sarandë having no option other than to retreat after protesting the Italian operation. After disembarking an infantry battalion and a cavalry squadron, the steamers departed at 16:00 on 2 October for Vlorë, where they embarked more troops. On 3 October, Ausonia and Polcevera landed a pack artillery battery and a second cavalry squadron, and on 4 October the operation was completed when Bulgaria and Choising put another infantry battalion and a third cavalry squadron ashore.

==== Battle of the Strait of Otranto ====
At 10:00 on 14 May 1917 Borea departed Gallipoli to escort a convoy made up of the steamships Bersagliere, Carroccio, and Verità to Vlorë. At around 03:30 on 15 May, shortly after the convoy turned to a heading of 310 degrees to proceed toward Vlorë, Borea sighted two unidentified destroyers. The ships Borea sighted were the Austro-Hungarian destroyers Balaton and Csepel, which had been sent to attack Allied convoys as a diversionary action in support of an Austro-Hungarian Navy attack by the light cruisers Helgoland, Novara, and Saida on the Otranto Barrage, an antisubmarine barrier in the Strait of Otranto. Balation and Csepel had sighted the Italian convoy at 03:06 Austrian time (which differed from Italian time), and were steering to attack it. After closing the range to around 1,000 metres (1,100 yd), Borea, still uncertain about the identity of the two ships, made recognition signals. In response Csepel opened gunfire. Borea maneuvered to make a torpedo attack against Csepel, but Csepel scored a hit that burst one of Borea′s steam pipes, immobilizing her. Csepel then hit Borea with two shells which struck near her waterline, and Borea began to list. Borea then took a shell hit on her bow. In the meantime, Balaton attacked the merchant ships of the convoy. Carroccio and Verità caught fire and their crews abandoned ship; Carroccio sank later, but Verità remained afloat and eventually reached port. Bersagliere suffered only slight damage and escaped.

The clash, a part of the larger Battle of the Strait of Otranto, the largest naval action of the Adriatic Campaign of World War I, ended at 03:45 when the two Austro-Hungarian ships withdrew. Borea′s crew abandoned ship, and she sank 05:20 on 15 May 1917. Her crew suffered 11 men killed and 12 wounded.
