= Italian destroyer Turbine (1901) =

Italian Nembo-class destroyer

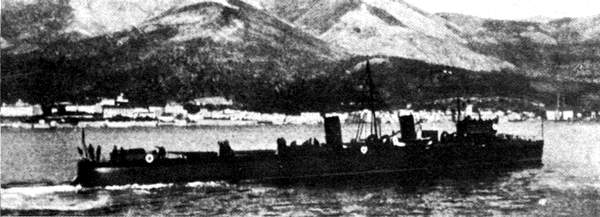
- Turbine in her original configuration with two funnels, sometime between 1902 and 1910.

History

Kingdom of Italy
- Name: Turbine
- Namesake: Vortex
- Builder: Cantiere Pattison, Naples, Kingdom of Italy
- Laid down: 20 August 1899
- Launched: 21 November 1901
- Completed: 28 August 1902
- Commissioned: August 1902
- Fate: Sunk 24 May 1915

General characteristics
- Type: Destroyer
- Displacement: 325 long tons (330 t) normal; 380 long tons (390 t) full load
- Length: 63.39 m (208 ft 0 in) pp; 64.00 m (210 ft 0 in) oa
- Beam: 5.94 m (19 ft 6 in)
- Draught: 2.29 m (7 ft 6 in)
- Propulsion: 2 × vertical triple-expansion steam engines; 3× Thornycroft boilers; 5,000 ihp (3,728 kW)
- Speed: 30 knots (56 km/h; 35 mph)
- Complement: 55
- Armament: As built: 1 × Cannon 76/40 (3 in) Model 1916 gun; 5 × QF 6 pounder Nordenfelt 57 mm/43 guns; 2 × 356 mm (14 in) torpedo tubes; 1905: 5 × QF 6 pounder Nordenfelt 57 mm/43 guns; 4 x 356 mm (14.0 in) torpedo tubes; 1909: 4 × Cannon 76/40 (3 in) Model 1916 guns; 2 x 450 mm (17.7 in) torpedo tubes

Turbine ("Vortex") was an Italian Nembo-class destroyer. Commissioned into service in the Italian Regia Marina ("Royal Navy") in 1902, she served in the Italo-Turkish War and World War I. She was sunk during the latter conflict in May 1915 on the day after Italy entered the war.

== Construction, commissioning, and modernization ==
Turbine was laid down at the Cantiere Pattison (English: Pattison Shipyard) in Naples, Italy, on 20 August 1899. She was launched on 21 November 1901 and completed on 28 August 1902. She was commissioned in August 1902. Turbine and the lead ship of her class, Nembo, had their armament modified in 1905, with each having her Cannon 76/40 (3 in) Model 1916 gun removed and two additional 356-millimetre (14 in) torpedo tubes installed, giving them the same armament as that of the following three Nembo-class ships.

At various times between 1909 and 1912, each of the Nembo-class destroyers underwent a radical modernization; Turbine′s took place in 1909. Her coal-fired boilers were converted into oil-fired ones, and her original two short, squat funnels were replaced with three smaller, more streamlined ones, profoundly altering her appearance. Her armament also changed, with her original five QF 6 pounder Nordenfelt 57 mm/43 guns replaced by four Cannon 76/40 (3 in) Model 1916 guns, and her original four 356-millimetre (14 in) torpedo tubes replaced by two 450-millimetre (17.7 in) tubes. In 1914–1915 Turbine underwent additional modifications, receiving equipment that allowed her to lay 10 to 16 mines.

== Service history ==
=== Italo-Turkish War ===
Turbine participated in the Italo-Turkish War, which began on 29 September 1911 with the Kingdom of Italy′s declaration of war on the Ottoman Empire. She was assigned at the time to the 4th Destroyer Squadron along with her sister ships Aquilone, Borea, and Nembo. On 17 April 1912 she suffered damage in a collision with Nembo, but not enough to prevent her from joining Nembo, the armored cruisers Francesco Ferruccio, Giuseppe Garibaldi, Varese, and Vettor Pisani, the torpedo cruiser Coatit, and the torpedo boats Climene, Pegaso, Perseo, and Procione in a bombardment of the Ottoman forts of Gum-Galesch and Sed Ul Bahr in the Dardanelles on 18 April 1912. The war ended on 18 October 1912 in an Italian victory.

=== World War I ===
World War I broke out in 1914, and Italy entered the war on the side of the Allies with its declaration of war on Austria-Hungary on 23 May 1915. At the time, Turbine, under the command of Capitano di corvetta (Corvette Captain) Luigi Bianchi, as well as Aquilone, Borea, Nembo, and their sister ship Espero made up the 5th Destroyer Squadron, based at Taranto. On the afternoon of 23 May 1915, the day Italy declared war, Turbine and Aquilone got underway to patrol in the Adriatic Sea along the Italian coast as far north as Manfredonia.

While Turbine and Aquilone were on patrol, numerous Austro-Hungarian Navy ships left port during the night of 23–24 May 1915 to carry out previously planned bombardments of military targets and coastal cities along Italy's Adriatic coast. At 04:10 on 24 May Aquilone sighted the Austro-Hungarian light cruiser Helgoland, which was bombarding Barletta. Aquilone steered to attack Helgoland, but soon found herself having the worst of the clash as Helgoland interrupted her bombardment and pursued the smaller and less-heavily armed Aquilone. At around 04:30, Turbine arrived on the scene, having identified Helgoland from a range of 9,000 metres (9,800 yd) and closed at high speed to distract Helgoland both from her pursuit of Aquilone and from her bombardment of Barletta. As Aquilone pulled away, Helgoland shifted fire to Turbine and maneuvered to prevent Turbine from interposing herself between Helgoland and the Italian coast.

Outgunned by Helgoland, Turbine took advantage of her greater speed to pull away from the Austro-Hungarian cruiser in an attempt to lure her northward in the direction of the Palagruža (known to the Italians as the Pelagosa) archipelago, where Italian warships that could come to Turbine′s assistance were conducting an amphibious landing. The distance between Turbine and Helgoland increased to over 7,000 metres (7,700 yd), although with the first light of dawn Turbine had to turn toward the east to avoid running aground on the promontory of Gargano.

At 05:30 Turbine sighted the Austro-Hungarian destroyers Csepel and Tátra — larger, more modern, faster, and better armed than Turbine — off her port bow. As the ships passed Vieste on Gargano, the northbound Turbine was substantially surrounded, with Csepel 5,400 metres (5,900 yd) off her port quarter, Tátra 6,000 metres (6,600 yd) astern, and Helgoland 7,000 metres (7,700 yd) abeam to starboard. The Austro-Hungarian ships opened fire at 05:48, damaging Turbine and wounding some members of her crew, including Bianchi. Turbine returned fire and hit Csepel′s mainmast, wounding some of Csepel′s crew.

At 05:50 the ships temporarily ceased fire after sighting another ship to the north-northeast, but they resumed fire at 06:00, when Tátra was about 5,000 metres (5,500 yd) from Turbine and Csepel was 4,600 metres (5,000 yd) away. At 06:10, Turbine′s crew identified the ship sighted at 05:50 as the Austro-Hungarian destroyer Lika, which by then was 6,500 metres (7,100 yd) from Turbine. At 06:30 Lika, which had closed with Turbine to a range of 4,500 metres (4,900 yd), opened fire, quickly scoring two hits, a 66-millimetre (2.6 in) shell which hit Turbine′s forward boiler, causing a violent explosion that damaged her bridge, and shortly after that a 102-millimetre (4 in) shell that hit Turbine′s aft boiler and the starboard side of her wheelhouse. Turbine′s engines shut down, and her inertia carried her only for a short distance before she went dead in the water.

The Austro-Hungarian ships closed to a range of 1,000 metres (1,100 yd), then ceased fire and ordered Turbine′s crew to abandon ship. Turbine′s crew began scuttling procedures, then took to the lifeboats. After destroying secret documents, Bianchi remained aboard the sinking Turbine until the chief helmsman took him onto one of the lifeboats at 06:51. Reduced to a riddled and burning wreck, Turbine sank shortly afterwards.

Turbine′s 53-man crew suffered 10 killed in action. The Austro-Hungarian ships rescued 32 survivors, including Bianchi, and took them as prisoners-of-war. Informed by radio at 06:17 of the clash, the Italian protected cruiser Libia and auxiliary cruiser Città di Siracusa, which were supporting the amphibious landing at the Palagruža archipelago, rushed to the scene and engaged in a brief, indecisive clash with the Austro-Hungarian ships before the Austro-Hungarians withdrew. Libia recovered a sailor who had jumped overboard from an Austro-Hungarian ship to avoid becoming a prisoner, while Città di Siracusa rescued eight men and recovered the bodies of two others. Città di Siracusa transferred the survivors and corpses to Libia. Meanwhile, the Austro-Hungarians transported the Italians they had rescued to Sebenico, where an Italian stoker died of burns he had suffered in Turbine′s sinking.

== Crew awards ==
Bianchi received the Silver Medal of Military Valor. The second chief mechanic and two stokers also were decorated "in memory of" Turbine. Posthumous Silver Medals of Military Valor went to the stoker who died in Sebenico and one of the men whose bodies Città di Siracusa recovered. The other man whose body Città di Siracusa recovered received a posthumous Bronze Medal of Military Valor.

== Commemoration ==
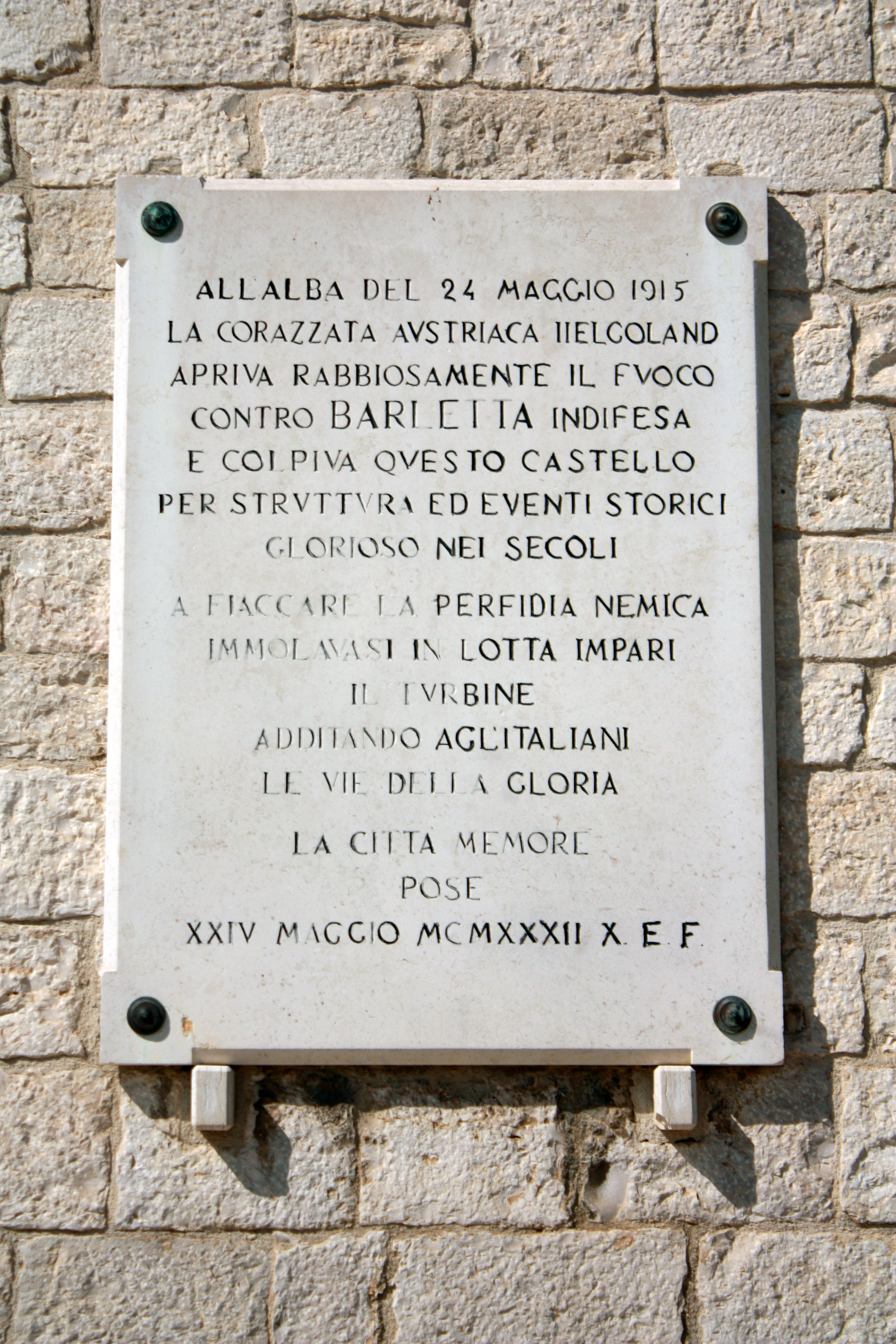
The marble plaque commemorating Turbine at the Castle of Barletta.

On 24 May 1932, a marble plaque commemorating Turbine was placed at the entrance of the ravelin of Castle of Barletta on the 17th anniversary of her loss. It reads:

At dawn on 24 May 1915, the Austrian battleship [sic] Helgoland rabidly opened fire on defenseless Barletta and struck this castle, glorious over the centuries because of its structure and historical events. To sap the perfidious enemy, the Turbine sacrificed herself in an unequal struggle, pointing the Italians to the path of glory. Placed in memory by the city. XXIV May MCMXXXII XI E.F.

Another plaque commemorating Turbine was placed in Manfredonia.

On 24 May 2019, a monument in memory of the men killed in the sinking of Turbine was dedicated in the gardens in front of the Castle of Barletta.
