= Italian destroyer Aquilone (1902) =

Italian Nembo-class destroyer

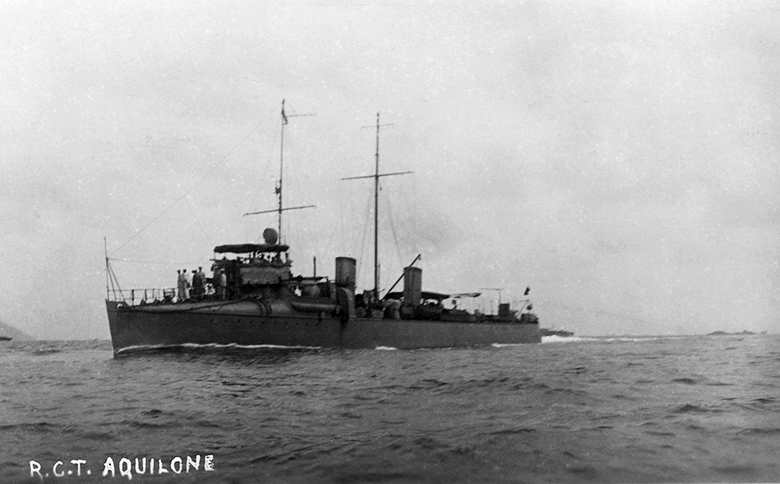
- Aquilone in 1905 in her original two-funnel configuration.

History

Kingdom of Italy
- Name: Aquilone
- Namesake: Aquilone, a strong, cold, northerly or northeasterly wind
- Builder: Cantiere Pattison, Naples, Kingdom of Italy
- Laid down: 10 September 1899
- Launched: 16 October 1902
- Commissioned: 1903
- Reclassified: Torpedo boat 1921
- Stricken: 1923
- Fate: Scrapped

General characteristics
- Type: Destroyer
- Displacement: 325 long tons (330 t) normal; 380 long tons (390 t) full load
- Length: 63.39 m (208 ft 0 in) pp; 64.00 m (210 ft 0 in) oa
- Beam: 5.94 m (19 ft 6 in)
- Draught: 2.29 m (7 ft 6 in)
- Propulsion: 2 × vertical triple-expansion steam engines; 3× Thornycroft boilers; 5,000 ihp (3,728 kW)
- Speed: 30 knots (56 km/h; 35 mph)
- Complement: 55
- Armament: As built: 5 × QF 6 pounder Nordenfelt 57 mm/43 guns; 3 × 356 mm (14 in) torpedo tubes; 1 × 356 mm (14 in) bow torpedo tube; 1910: 4 × Cannon 76/40 (3 in) Model 1916 guns; 2 x 450 mm (17.7 in) torpedo tubes

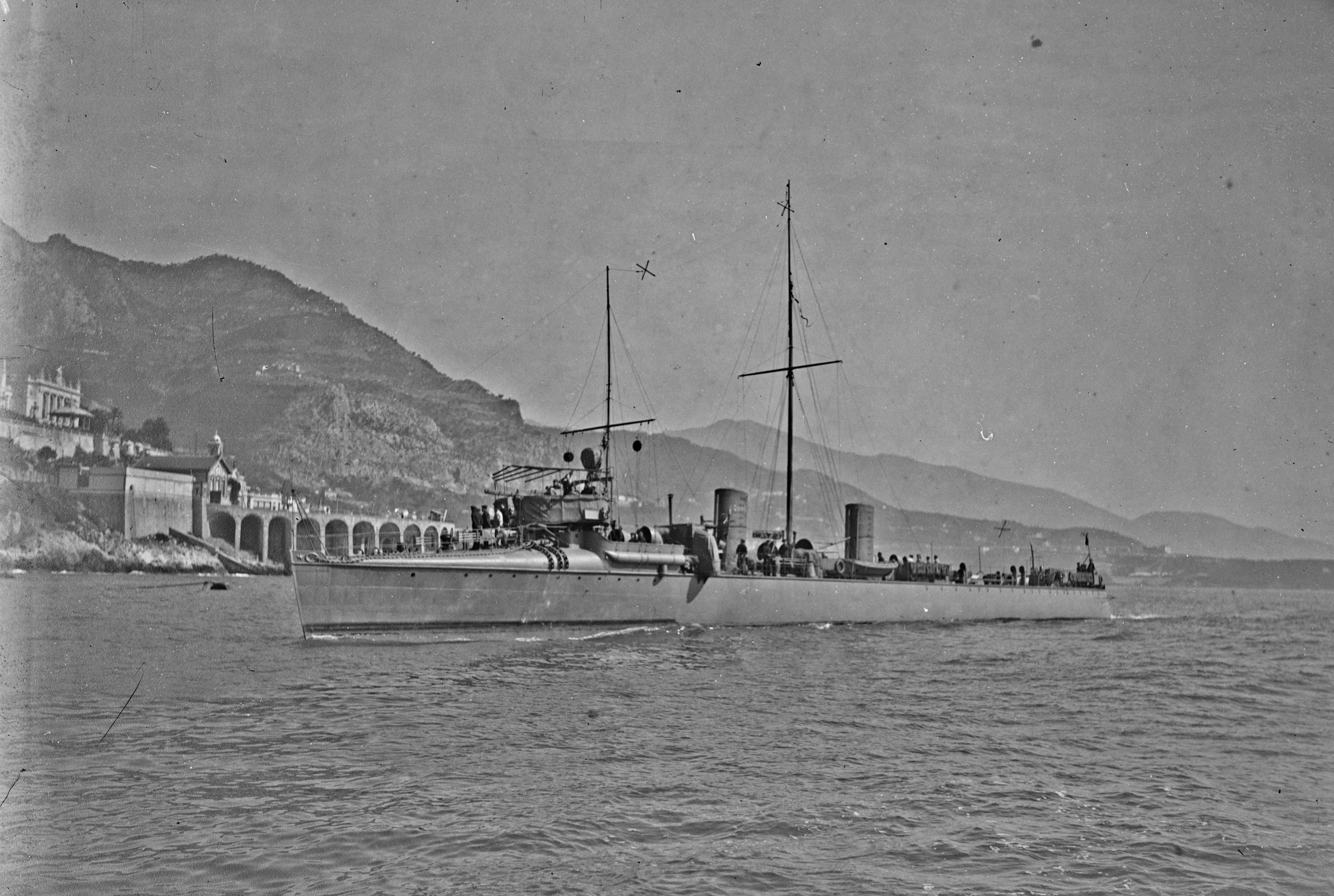
Aquilone off Monaco in her original two-funnel configuration in April 1906.

Aquilone (Italian: Aquilone) was an Italian Nembo-class destroyer. Commissioned into service in the Italian Regia Marina (Royal Navy) in 1903, she served in the Italo-Turkish War and World War I, playing an active role in the Adriatic campaign. Reclassified as a torpedo boat in 1921, she was stricken in 1923.

== Construction, commissioning, and modernization ==
Aquilone was laid down at the Cantiere Pattison (English: Pattison Shipyard) in Naples, Italy, on 10 September 1899 and launched on 16 October 1902. She was commissioned in 1903.

At various times between 1909 and 1912, each of the Nembo-class destroyers underwent a radical modernization; Aquilone′s took place in 1910. Her coal-fired boilers were converted into oil-fired ones, and her original two short, squat funnels were replaced with three smaller, more streamlined ones, profoundly altering her appearance. Her armament also changed, with her original five QF 6 pounder Nordenfelt 57 mm/43 guns replaced by four Cannon 76/40 (3 in) Model 1916 guns, and her original four 356-millimetre (14 in) torpedo tubes replaced by two 450-millimetre (17.7 in) tubes. Sometime between 1914 and 1918, Aquilone underwent additional modifications in which minelaying equipment was installed aboard her.

== Service history ==
=== Italo-Turkish War ===
Aquilone participated in the Italo-Turkish War, which began on 29 September 1911 with the Kingdom of Italy′s declaration of war on the Ottoman Empire. She was assigned at the time to the 2nd Squadron's 4th Division along with her sister ships Borea, Nembo, and Turbine. On 4 May 1912, Aquilone and Nembo occupied the island of Lipsos in the Dodecanese in the Aegean Sea. The war ended on 18 October 1912 in an Italian victory.

=== World War I ===
World War I broke out in 1914, and the Kingdom of Italy entered the war on the side of the Allies with its declaration of war on Austria-Hungary on 23 May 1915. At the time, Aquilone, under the command of Capitano di corvetta (Corvette Captain) Pontremoli, as well as Borea, Nembo, Turbine, and their sister ship Espero made up the 5th Destroyer Squadron, based at Taranto. On the afternoon of 23 May 1915, the day Italy declared war, Aquilone and Turbine got underway to patrol in the Adriatic Sea along the Italian coast as far north as Manfredonia. While Aquilone and Turbine were on patrol, numerous Austro-Hungarian Navy ships left port during the night of 23–24 May 1915 to carry out previously planned bombardments of military targets and coastal cities along Italy's Adriatic coast should Italy declare war. At 04:10 on 24 May Aquilone sighted the Austro-Hungarian light cruiser Helgoland, which was bombarding Barletta, and steered to attack Helgoland, but soon found herself having the worst of the clash as Helgoland interrupted her bombardment and pursued the smaller and less-heavily armed Aquilone. At around 04:30, Turbine arrived on the scene, having identified Helgoland from a range of 9,000 metres (9,800 yd) and closed at high speed to distract Helgoland both from her pursuit of Aquilone and from her bombardment of Barletta. As Aquilone pulled away, Helgoland shifted fire to Turbine. Aquilone escaped, but Helgoland and the Austro-Hungarian destroyers Csepel, Lika, and Tátra sank Turbine.

On 31 May 1916 the Austro-Hungarian destroyers Balaton and Orjen attacked the Otranto Barrage in the Strait of Otranto and sank the naval drifter Beneficent – a modified fishing boat that tended the antisubmarine nets of the barrage – and Aquilone and the torpedo boat Centauro got underway from Brindisi in response. Aquilone, Centauro, the auxiliary cruiser Città di Siracusa, and the destroyer Ardito forced Balaton and Orjen to withdraw.

On 23 August 1916 Aquilone, under the command of an officer named Farina, departed Vlorë (known to the Italians as Valona) in the Principality of Albania participated with the armored cruiser Francesco Ferruccio, the torpedo cruiser Minerva, the minesweeper Taide, and two gunboats to occupy Porto Palermo on the coast of Albania. The occupation went smoothly: Francesco Ferruccio landed a platoon of sailors, and the small garrison of Greek gendarmes retreated without offering any resistance.

Aquilone continued her World War I service without taking part in any other significant actions. By late October 1918, Austria-Hungary had effectively disintegrated, and the Armistice of Villa Giusti, signed on 3 November 1918, went into effect on 4 November 1918 and brought hostilities between Austria-Hungary and the Allies to an end. World War I ended a week later with an armistice between the Allies and the German Empire on 11 November 1918.

=== Post-World War I ===
After World War I ended, Aquilone underwent modifications to her superstructure which involved removing of one of her three funnels and moving her bridge aft. Reclassified as a torpedo boat in 1921, she was stricken from the naval register in 1923 and subsequently scrapped.
