= Nembo-class destroyer =

Italian destroyer class

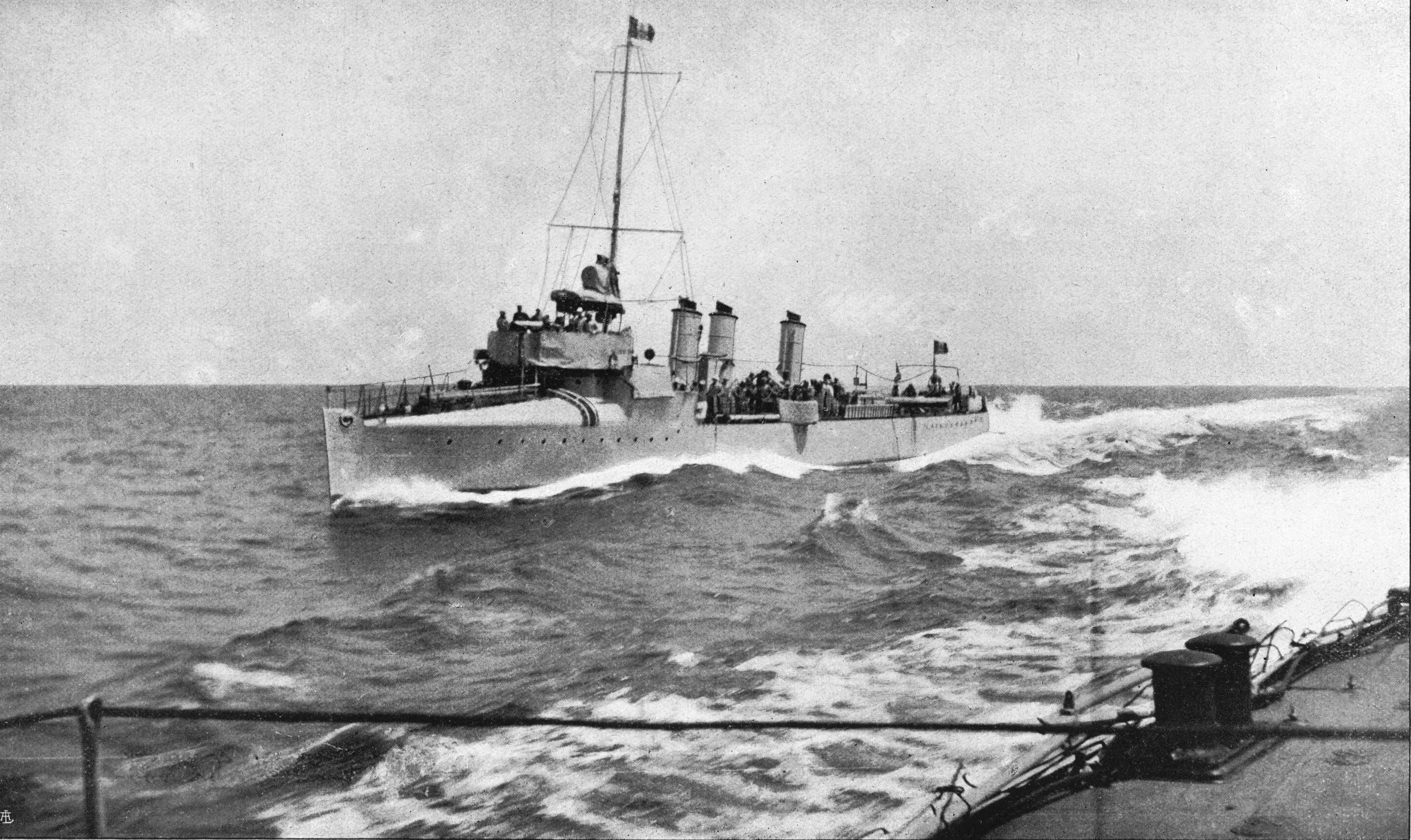
- Zeffiro

Class overview
- Name: Nembo class
- Builders: Pattison, Naples
- Operators: Regia Marina
- Preceded by: Lampo class
- Succeeded by: Soldato class
- Built: 1899–1905
- In commission: 1902–1924
- Completed: 6
- Lost: 3
- Scrapped: 3

General characteristics
- Type: Destroyer
- Displacement: 325 long tons (330 t) normal; 380 long tons (390 t) full load
- Length: 63.39 m (208 ft 0 in) pp; 64.00 m (210 ft 0 in) oa
- Beam: 5.94 m (19 ft 6 in)
- Draught: 2.29 m (7 ft 6 in)
- Propulsion: 2 × Vertical triple-expansion steam engines; 3× Thornycroft boilers; 5,000 ihp (3,728 kW)
- Speed: 30 knots (56 km/h; 35 mph)
- Complement: 55
- Armament: Nembo and Turbine: 1 × 76 mm/40 gun 5 × 57 mm/43 guns 2 × 356 mm (14 in) torpedo tubes Remaining ships: 5 × 57 mm/43 guns 3 × 356 mm (14 in) torpedo tubes 1 × 356 mm (14 in) bow tube

The Nembo class was a class of destroyer of the Italian Regia Marina (Royal Navy). Six destroyers were built by the Pattison shipyard of Naples between 1899 and 1905, to a design based on the contemporary destroyers of the British shipyard Thornycroft. They were active in the Italo-Turkish War and in the First World War, where three were lost.

== Design ==
In 1899, work began at the Pattison shipyard of Naples on the first ships of a new class of destroyers, the Nembo class. The Nembo class were based on a design by the British shipbuilders Thornycroft, and were similar to the Thirty-knotter destroyers that Thornycroft were building for the British Royal Navy (such as HMS Stag).

The ships were 64.0 metres (210 ft 0 in) long overall and 63.39 metres (208 ft 0 in) between perpendiculars, with a beam of 5.94 metres (19 ft 6 in) and a draught of 2.29 metres (7 ft 6 in). Displacement was 325 long tons (330 t) normal and 380 long tons (390 t) full load. Three Thornycroft boilers fed steam to two triple expansion steam engines rated at 5,000 indicated horsepower (3,700 kW) and driving two propeller shafts, giving a design speed of 30 knots (56 km/h; 35 mph). The ships featured a raised turtleback (Note: A turtleback is an arched structure over the deck of a ship, normally at the ship's bow.) forecastle and two funnels. Crew was between 51 and 58 officers and men.

The first two ships of the class, Nembo and Turbine were armed with one 76 mm (3 in)/40 calibre gun (capable of firing a 5.9 kilograms (13 lb) shell to a range of 9,850 metres (32,320 ft) at a rate of fire of 15 rounds per minute per gun) and five 57 mm/43 guns, with two 356 mm (14 in) torpedo tubes, while the remaining four ships had a reduced gun armament of five 57 mm/43 guns, allowing an increased torpedo armament of four 356 mm torpedo tubes to be carried.

The six ships of the class were completed between 1902 and 1905, reaching speeds of up to 30.2 knots (55.9 km/h; 34.8 mph) during sea trials (corresponding to a realistic sea speed of 27 knots (50 km/h; 31 mph)).

Nembo and Turbine were rearmed in 1905 to match the other four ships. From 1908, all ships of the class were fitted with new oil-fired boilers, with a resulting change in the ships' profile, with three funnels being fitted rather than two. Sufficient oil was carried to give a range of 330 nautical miles (610 km; 380 mi) at 25 knots (46 km/h; 29 mph) or 2,200 nautical miles (4,100 km; 2,500 mi) at 9 knots (17 km/h; 10 mph). The ships' armament was changed at the same time, to four 76 mm/40 guns and two 450 mm (18 in) torpedo tubes.

== Service ==
The ships of the class were active during the Italo-Turkish War of 1911–1912. They were fitted for minelaying, with a capacity of 10–16 mines during the First World War, during which three destroyers were lost. Following the end of the war, the remaining three ships had a boiler removed, with the consequent loss of a funnel, together with a 76 mm gun, and were reclassified as torpedo boats.

== Ships ==
Ship	Laid down	Launched	Completed	Operational History
Nembo	6 August 1899	18 May 1901	26 June 1902	Torpedoed by Austro-Hungarian submarine U-16 on 17 October 1916. (Note: U-16 was also sunk in this engagement, possibly by the explosion of Nembo's depth charges after the destroyer sank, or possibly by ramming, either by Nembo or by another ship.)
Turbine	20 August 1899	21 November 1901	28 August 1902	Sunk by Austro-Hungarian cruiser Helgoland and destroyers Csepel, Tátra and Lika on 24 May 1915.
Aquilone	10 September 1899	16 October 1902	12 October 1903	Re-rated as torpedo boat 1 July 1921, discarded 4 March 1923.
Borea	2 October 1899	12 December 1902	6 October 1903	Sunk by Austro-Hungarian destroyers Csepel and Balaton 14/15 May 1917.
Zeffiro		14 May 1904	1 April 1905	Re-rated as torpedo boat 1 July 1921, discarded 13 March 1923.
Espero		9 July 1904	1 April 1905	Renamed Turbine 16 January 1921. Re-rated as torpedo boat 1 July 1921, discarded 5 April 1923.
