= Italian destroyer Nembo (1901) =

Italian Nembo-class destroyer

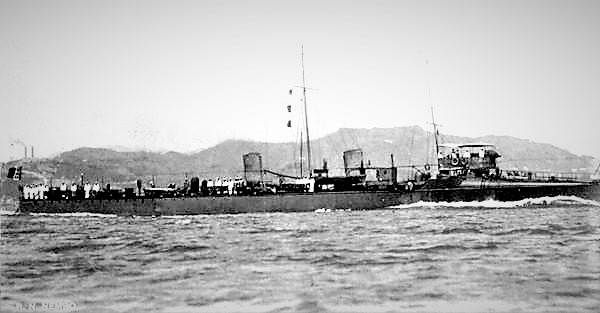
- Nembo in her original configuration with two funnels, sometime between 1902 and 1909.

History

Kingdom of Italy
- Name: Nembo
- Namesake: Nimbus, a now-outdated term for a nimbostratus cloud
- Builder: Cantiere Pattison, Naples, Kingdom of Italy
- Laid down: 6 August 1899
- Launched: 18 May 1901
- Completed: 26 June 1902
- Commissioned: June 1902
- Fate: Sunk 17 October 1916

General characteristics
- Type: Destroyer
- Displacement: 325 long tons (330 t) normal; 380 long tons (390 t) full load
- Length: 63.39 m (208 ft 0 in) pp; 64.00 m (210 ft 0 in) oa
- Beam: 5.94 m (19 ft 6 in)
- Draught: 2.29 m (7 ft 6 in)
- Propulsion: 2 × vertical triple-expansion steam engines; 3× Thornycroft boilers; 5,000 ihp (3,728 kW)
- Speed: 30 knots (56 km/h; 35 mph)
- Complement: 55
- Armament: As built: 1 × Cannon 76/40 (3 in) Model 1916 gun; 5 × QF 6 pounder Nordenfelt 57 mm/43 guns; 2 × 356 mm (14 in) torpedo tubes; 1905: 5 × QF 6 pounder Nordenfelt 57 mm/43 guns; 4 x 356 mm (14.0 in) torpedo tubes; 1909: 4 × Cannon 76/40 (3 in) Model 1916 guns; 2 x 450 mm (17.7 in) torpedo tubes

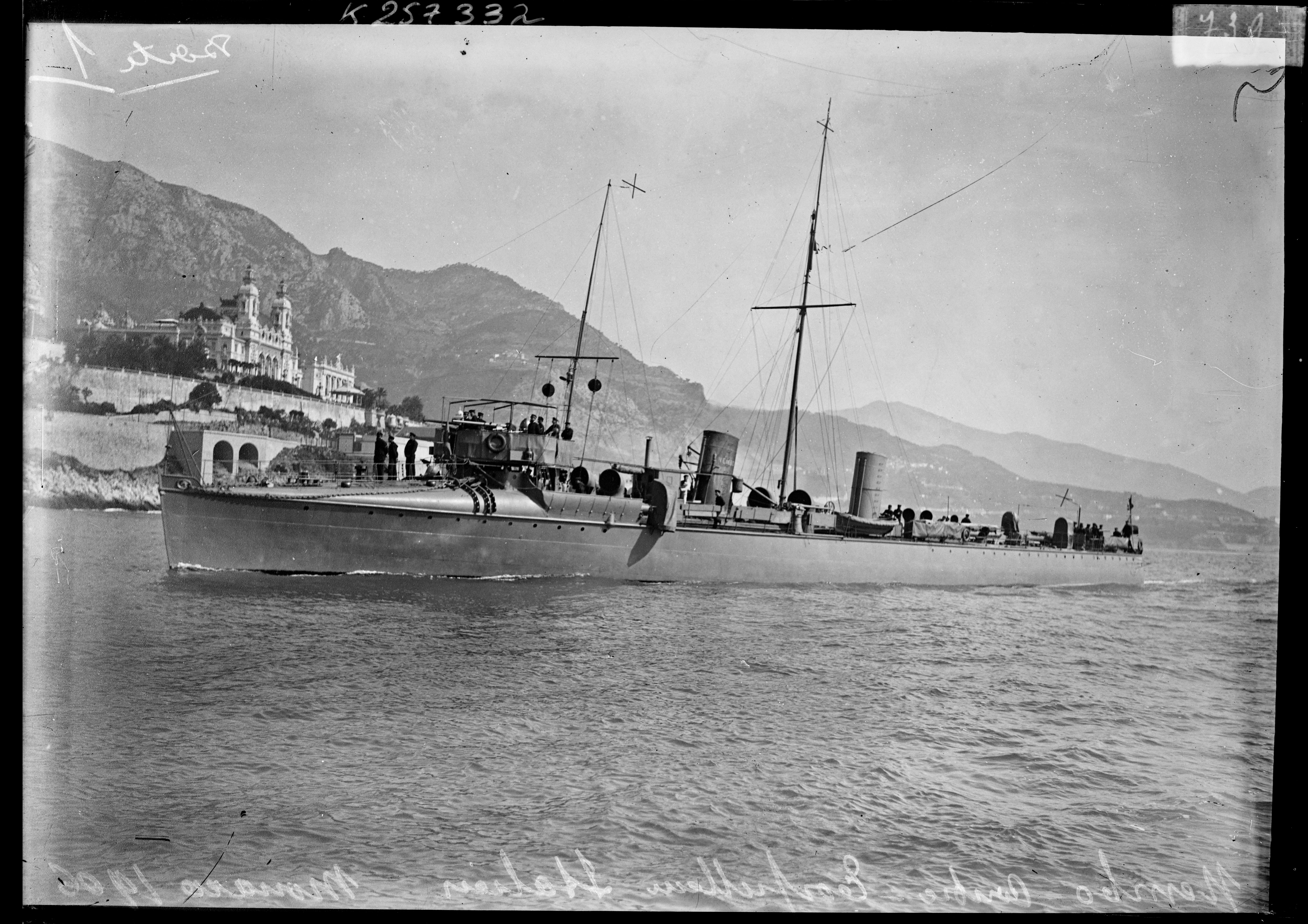
Nembo off Monaco in 1906 in her original configuration with two funnels.

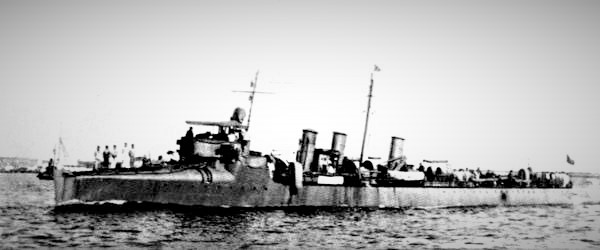
Nembo in 1914 or 1915. just before Italy's entry into World War I. in the three-funnel configuration that resulted from her 1909 modernization.

Nembo ("Nimbus") was the lead ship of the Italian Nembo-class destroyers. Commissioned into service in the Italian Regia Marina ("Royal Navy") in 1902, she served in the Italo-Turkish War and World War I. She was sunk during the latter conflict in October 1916.

== Construction, commissioning, and modernization ==
Nembo was laid down at the Cantiere Pattison (English: Pattison Shipyard) in Naples, Italy, on 6 August 1899. She was launched on 18 May 1901 and completed on 26 June 1902. She was commissioned in June 1902. Nembo, like her sister ship, Turbine, had her armament modified in 1905, each having her Cannon 76/40 (3 in) Model 1916 gun removed and two additional 356-millimetre (14 in) torpedo tubes installed, giving them the same armament as that of the following three Nembo-class ships.

At various times between 1909 and 1912, each of the Nembo-class destroyers underwent a radical modernization; Nembo′s took place in 1909. Her coal-fired boilers were converted into oil-fired ones, and her original two short, squat funnels were replaced with three smaller, more streamlined ones, profoundly altering her appearance. Her armament also changed, with her original five QF 6 pounder Nordenfelt 57 mm/43 guns replaced by four Cannon 76/40 (3 in) Model 1916 guns, and her original four 356-millimetre (14 in) torpedo tubes replaced by 2 450-millimetre (17.7 in) tubes. In 1914–1916 Nembo underwent additional modifications, receiving equipment that allowed her to lay 10 to 16 mines.

== Service history ==
=== Italo-Turkish War ===
The Italo-Turkish War began on 29 September 1911 with the Kingdom of Italy′s declaration of war on the Ottoman Empire. Nembo was assigned at the time to the 2nd Squadron's 4th Division along with her sister ships Aquilone, Borea, and Turbine. On 17 April 1912 she suffered damage in a collision with Turbine, but not enough to prevent her from joining Turbine, the armored cruisers Francesco Ferruccio, Giuseppe Garibaldi, Varese, and Vettor Pisani, the torpedo cruiser Coatit, and the torpedo boats Climene, Pegaso, Perseo, and Procione in a bombardment of the Ottoman forts of Gum-Galesch and Sed Ul Bahr in the Dardanelles on 18 April 1912. On 4 May 1912, Nembo and Aquilone occupied the island of Lipsos in the Dodecanese in the Aegean Sea.

At 04:00 on 14 July 1912, Nembo got underway from Stampalia in the Dodecanese with Borea and Vettor Pisani to provide support to the torpedo boats Astore, Centauro, Climene, Perseo, and Spica as they conducted a reconnaissance of the Dardanelles. The ships first steamed to the Italian-occupied island of Leros in the southern Aegean Sea, where the torpedo boats were prepared for the incursion. They then proceeded to Strati (also known as Bozaba), where they arrived on 17 July 1912 and the officer who would command the torpedo boats during the operation joined the force. Delayed by bad weather, the force left Strati on the afternoon of 18 July bound for the Dardanelles. While Nembo, Vettor Pisani, and Borea remained off the coast out of sight of land, the torpedo boats penetrated the Dardanelles, noting the location of Ottoman ships and the defenses of the strait. Suffering only slight damage and no casualties, the torpedo boats returned to Vettor Pisani during the predawn hours of 19 July 1912. The war ended on 18 October 1912 in an Italian victory.

=== World War I ===
==== 1915–1916 ====
World War I broke out in 1914, and the Italy entered the war on the side of the Allies with its declaration of war on Austria-Hungary on 23 May 1915. At the time, Nembo, under the command of Capitano di fregata (Frigate Captain) Sorrentino, as well as Aquilone, Borea, Turbine, and their sister ship Espero made up the 5th Destroyer Squadron, based at Taranto.

On 23 June 1916 Nembo and the French Navy destroyer Casque, later joined by the French destroyer Protet and four Italian torpedo boats, took part in rescuing the survivors of the Italian auxiliary cruiser Città di Messina and the French destroyer Fourche, torpedoed and sunk by the Austro-Hungarian Navy submarine U-15 while on a reconnaissance cruise in the Strait of Otranto. Rescuers saved 302 of the 335 men who had been aboard Città di Messina and 66 of the 85 men who had been aboard Fourche.

In October 1916 Nembo, Borea, the destroyers Ascaro and Garibaldino, and four torpedo boats provided protection and support to a landing force consisting of Francesco Ferruccio and the steamers Ausonia, Bulgaria, Choising, and Polcevera sent to occupy Sarandë (known to the Italians as Santi Quaranta), in the Principality of Albania. At 05:15 on 2 October 1916, four platoons of sailors, a unit of miners, and a unit of personnel from Francesco Ferruccio landed on the beach and quickly occupied the area, the 32 members of the Greek garrison at Sarandë having no option other than to retreat after protesting the Italian operation. After disembarking an infantry battalion and a cavalry squadron, the steamers departed at 16:00 on 2 October for Vlorë (known to the Italians as Valona), Albania, where they embarked more troops. On 3 October, Ausonia and Polcevera landed a pack artillery battery and a second cavalry squadron, and on 4 October the operation was completed when Bulgaria and Choising put another infantry battalion and a third cavalry squadron ashore.

==== Loss ====
On 16 October 1916 Nembo, under the command of Capitano di corvetta (Corvette Captain) Russo, left Vlorë to escort the steamer Bormida, which was bound for Sarandë with troops on board. On 17 October, between Vlorë and Sazan (known to the Italians as Saseno) the Austro-Hungarian submarine U-16 attacked the convoy, hitting Nembo with two torpedoes. Nembo broke in two and sank quickly at 40°08′N 019°30′E. U-16 also sank during the clash, although how and why she sank is unclear: According to some sources Nembo rammed U-16 before sinking, while other sources claim that Nembo′s depth charges sank U-16 when they exploded after falling overboard while Nembo sank. Still other sources claim that U-16 sank after colliding with Bormida.

Of Nembo′s 55-man crew, 32 died in the sinking, including Russo, the executive officer, the chief engineer, and another engineering officer. Twenty-three men survived, either rescued by Italian ships or swimming to the Albanian coast. Among U-16′s crew, two men died and 14 survived. Of the Italians who survived by swimming to shore, four refused rescue by a lifeboat manned by U-16′s survivors so as to avoid being taken prisoner. After reaching the coast, they contributed to the capture of the Austro-Hungarians in the lifeboat, who were taken prisoner by Italian ships.
