= Armeeoberkommando =

German and Austrian army command level

Armeeoberkommando ("Army Higher Command"; AOK) was a command level in the German and Austro-Hungarian armies, especially during World War I and World War II. It was equivalent to a British, French, American, Italian, Japanese, or Imperial Russian "Army".

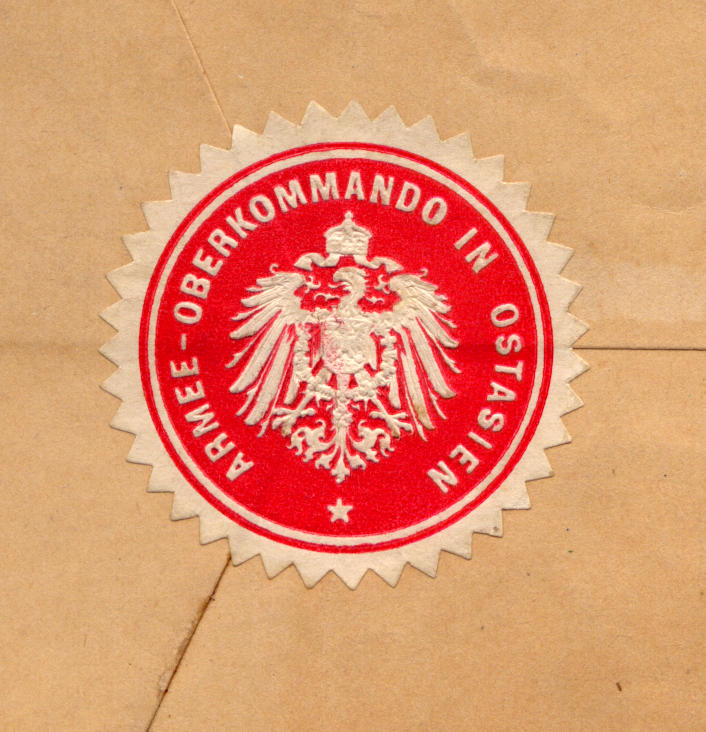
Sticker used as a seal for the ArmeeOberkommando in East Asia on the back of a 1901 letter

== World War I ==
=== Germany ===
The army of the German Empire had so-called Armee-Inspektionen ("Army Inspectorates") as the command authorities above army corps. These were numbered from I to VIII. During World War I, they were renamed to Armeeoberkommandos.

=== Austria-Hungary ===
In Austria-Hungary an Armeeoberkommando (AOK) - there was only one - was established in summer 1914 at the outbreak of the war. It was the command center for all land and naval forces of the Dual Monarchy. It was led by the following Armeeoberkommandanten ("army commanders-in-chief"): Archduke Frederick; from 2 December 1916, Emperor Charles I himself; on 3 November 1918, Arthur Arz; 4-11 November 1918, Hermann Kövess. Its chiefs of general staff were: to 1 March 1917, Field Marshal Conrad; from 2 November 1918, Arthur Arz. The AOK was stationed in Teschen in Austrian Silesia until 1916, and then in Baden bei Wien.

== World War II ==
Flag of the commander of an Armeeoberkommando in the Wehrmacht

During World War II, an AOK (usually commanded by a Generaloberst ["colonel general"] or above) controlled several army corps and had its own army troops, e.g., heavy artillery, engineers, and other specialist troops that were subordinated to it depending on availability and task. The AOK was the command level between army group and corps. Demands and allocation of logistic supplies usually went straight to the Oberquartiermeister ("senior quartermaster") of the AOK; the army group command was only involved in situations of crisis. The area of responsibility of an AOK was split into the operational area, which was further subdivided at corps and divisional level, and the army rear area, which was run by the Kommandanten rückwärtiges Gebiet ("Commander Rear Area"; Korück).

In the course of the war, in certain places as a stopgap alongside the AOKs, there were ad hoc formations called armeeabteilungen ("army troops") and kampfgruppen ("battle groups"). Such a formation would be named for its commander, and often did not have the usual levels of command support.

=== Organization of an AOK ===
The normal organization of an Armeeoberkommando during World War II was as follows:

- Commander-in-Chief – Oberbefehlshaber
  - Chief of Staff – Chef des Generalstabes; e.g., a major general
- Command Division – Führungsabteilung
  - First General Staff Officer (Ia) (Operations) – Erster Generalstabsoffizier (Ia) (Operationen)
  - Third General Staff Officer (Ic) (Enemy situation) – Dritter Generalstabsoffizier (Ic) (Feindlage)
  - Fourth General Staff Officer (Id) (Training) – Vierter Generalstabsoffizier (Id) (Ausbildung)
  - National Socialist Leadership Officer (NSFO; from 1944) – Nationalsozialistischer Führungsoffizier
- Senior Quartermaster's Division (Supplies) – Oberquartiermeisterabteilung (Nachschub)
  - Senior Quartermaster (O. Qu) – Oberquartiermeister (O. Qu)
  - Second General Staff Officer (Qu 1) – Zweiter Generalstabsoffizier (Qu 1)
  - Fifth General Staff Officer (Qu 2) – Fünfte Generalstabsoffizier (Qu 2)
  - Army Motor Transport Officer (A.O. Kraft) – Armee-Kraftfahroffizier
  - Army Intendant (IVa) – Armeeintendant
  - Army Surgeon (IVb) – Armeearzt
  - Army Veterinarian (IVc) – Armeeveterinär
- Adjutancy (management) – Adjutantur
  - First Adjutant IIa (Officers' personnel matters) – 1. Adjutant IIa (Personalangelegenheiten der Offiziere)
  - Second Adjutant IIb (NCOs' and soldiers' personnel matters) – 2. Adjutant IIb (Personalangelegenheiten der Unteroffiziere und Mannschaften)
  - Army Judge Advocate (III) – Oberstkriegsgerichtsrat
  - Army Chaplain (IVd) – Armeepfarrer
  - Headquarters Commandant – Hauptquartier Kommandant
- Branch Officers – Waffenoffizier
  - Army Chief of Engineers – Armeepionierführer (A.Pi.Fü)
  - Army Chief of Signal – Armeenachrichtenführer (A.Nachr.Fü.)
  - Gas Defense Staff Officer – Stabsoffizier für Gasabwehr
  - Anti-Tank Staff Officer – Stabsoffizier für Panzerbekämpfung (Stopak)

=== Armeeoberkommandos ===
- 1st Army
- 2nd Army
- 3rd Army
- 4th Army
- 5th Army
- 6th Army
- 7th Army
- 8th Army
- 9th Army
- 10th Army
- 11th Army
- 12th Army
- 14th Army
- 15th Army
- 16th Army
- 17th Army
- 18th Army
- 19th Army
- 21st Army
- 24th Army
- 25th Army
- 1st Parachute Army
- Army of Lappland / 20th Mountain Army
- Army of Liguria
- Army of East Prussia
- Army of Norway

=== Panzer Armeeoberkommandos ===
- 1st Panzer Army
- 2nd Panzer Army
- 3rd Panzer Army
- 4th Panzer Army
- 5th Panzer Army
- 6th Panzer Army
- Panzer Army Africa / German-Italian Panzer Army
- 11th SS Panzer Army

== See also ==
- Field army
