= SMS Triglav (1917) =

Austro-Hungarian Erzatz Triglav-class destroyer

History

Austria-Hungary
- Name: Triglav
- Builder: Ganz-Danubius, Porto Ré, Kingdom of Croatia-Slavonia, Austro-Hungarian Empire
- Laid down: 24 August 1916
- Launched: 24 February 1917
- Completed: 21 July 1917
- Fate: Ceded to Italy, 1920

Kingdom of Italy
- Name: Grado
- Acquired: 1920
- Stricken: 30 September 1937
- Fate: Scrapped, 1937

General characteristics
- Class & type: Ersatz Triglav-class destroyer
- Displacement: 880 t (870 long tons) (normal); 1,050 t (1,030 long tons) (deep load)
- Length: 85.28 m (279 ft 9 in) (o/a)
- Beam: 7.8 m (25 ft 7 in)
- Draft: 3.2 m (10 ft 6 in) (deep load)
- Installed power: 6 × Yarrow boilers; 20,650 shp (15,400 kW)
- Propulsion: 2 × shafts; 2 × steam turbines
- Speed: 32.6 knots (60.4 km/h; 37.5 mph)
- Range: 500 nmi (930 km; 580 mi) at full speed
- Complement: 114
- Armament: 2 × single 10 cm (3.9 in) guns; 4 × single 66 mm (2.6 in) guns; 2 × single 66 mm AA guns; 2 × twin 45 cm (17.7 in) torpedo tubes

SMS Triglav (Note: "SMS" stands for "Seiner Majestät Schiff", or "His Majesty's Ship".) was one of four Ersatz Triglav-class destroyers built for the kaiserliche und königliche Kriegsmarine (Austro-Hungarian Navy) during the First World War. Completed in 1917, she participated in several unsuccessful raids on the Otranto Barrage later that year. She was transferred to Italy in 1920 in accordance with the peace treaties ending the war and renamed Grado. The Regia Marina (Royal Italian Navy) kept her in service until 1937 and the ship was subsequently scrapped.

== Background and description ==
The loss of two Tátra-class destroyers in the 1st Battle of Durazzo in 1915 caused the Austro-Hungarian Navy to begin construction of four improved versions of the Tátras the following year.

The Ersatz Triglav-class ships were slightly longer than the Tátras with an overall length of 85.28 meters (279 ft 9 in), a beam of 7.8 meters (25 ft 7 in), and a maximum draft of 3.2 meters (10 ft 6 in). They displaced 880 metric tons (870 long tons) at normal load and 1,050 metric tons (1,030 long tons) at deep load. The ships had a complement of 114 officers and enlisted men.

The destroyers were powered by two AEG-Curtiss steam turbine sets, each driving a single propeller shaft using steam provided by six Yarrow boilers. Four of the boilers were oil-fired while the remaining pair used coal, although oil was sprayed onto the coal to increase power. The turbines, designed to produce 20,650 shaft horsepower (15,400 kW), were intended to give the ships a speed of 32.6 knots (60.4 km/h; 37.5 mph). The ships carried enough oil and coal to give them a range of 500 nautical miles (930 km; 580 mi) at full speed.

The main armament of the Ersatz Triglav-class destroyers consisted of two Škoda Works 10-centimeter (3.9 in) K11 guns, one each fore and aft of the superstructure in single mounts. Their secondary armament consisted of four 66-millimeter (2.6 in) K09 TAG (German: Torpedoboot-Abwehr Geschütz (anti-torpedo boat guns)). Two additional guns were placed on anti-aircraft mountings. They were also equipped with four 450-millimeter (17.7 in) torpedo tubes in two twin rotating mountings aft of the funnels. Two spare torpedoes were stored on the main deck.

== Construction and service ==
The four Ersatz Triglav-class destroyers were ordered on 19 January 1916. Triglav was laid down at the Porto Re (now Kraljevica in Croatia) shipyard of Ganz-Danubius on 24 August 1916. The ship was launched on 24 February 1917 and completed on 21 July that year.

=== First World War ===
On 19 November 1917, Triglav, together with the destroyer Reka and eight torpedo-boats, laid mines in the shipping lane between Ancona and Venice. On the night of 28/29 November, Triglav was part of a force of seven destroyers and eight torpedo-boats that shelled points along the coast between Porto Corsini and Rimini, with Triglav, Dinara and four torpedo boats bombarding the coast at Metauro. On the journey back to port, the Austro-Hungarian force spotted 10 Italian destroyers, but no combat followed. On 19 December, Triglav was part of the escorts for the battleships Budapest and Árpád and the scout cruiser Admiral Spaun when they bombarded coastal artillery batteries at Cortellazzo.

On the night of 22/23 April 1918, Triglav, together with the destroyers Csepel, Dukla, Lika and Uzsok, under the command of Fregattenkapitän Karl Herkner aboard Triglav, carried out a raid into the Strait of Otranto with the objective of attacking shipping between Italy and Albania. They encountered the patrolling British destroyers Hornet and Jackal, and opened fire on the British ships after Hornet challenged the Austro-Hungarian ships. Both British ships were hit, with Hornet suffering a magazine explosion and a jammed rudder, but Herkner broke off the engagement after about 15 minutes, as Allied reinforcements were likely to arrive soon. Jackal pursued the retiring Austro-Hungarian ships and was joined by the British destroyer Alarm, the Australian Torrens and the French Cimeterre, but the faster Austro-Hungarian ships pulled away from the Allied destroyers and escaped unharmed. In June 1918, Rear Admiral Miklós Horthy, Commander-in-Chief of the Austro-Hungarian fleet, planned a large-scale attack by the Austro-Hungarian Fleet against the Otranto Barrage. Triglav, together with her three sister-ships and the cruisers Novara and Helgoland, were to attack between Fano and Santa Maria di Leuca, while a second group consisting of the cruisers Admiral Spaun and Saida and four torpedo-boats would attack near Otranto, with the Austro-Hungarian battleships deployed to engage any Allied ships that sortied in response. The operation was cancelled, however, when the battleship Szent István was sunk by an Italian motor torpedo boat early on 10 June.

=== End of the war ===
By October 1918 it had become clear that Austria-Hungary was facing defeat in the war. With various attempts to quell nationalist sentiments failing, Emperor Karl I decided to sever Austria-Hungary's alliance with Germany and appeal to the Allies in an attempt to preserve the empire from complete collapse. On 26 October Austria-Hungary informed Germany that their alliance was over. At the same time, the Austro-Hungarian Navy was in the process of tearing itself apart along ethnic and nationalist lines. Vice Admiral Miklós Horthy was informed on the morning of 28 October that an armistice was imminent, and used this news to maintain order and prevent a mutiny among the fleet. While a mutiny was spared, tensions remained high and morale was at an all-time low.

The following day the National Council in Zagreb announced Croatia's dynastic ties to Hungary had come to an end. This new provisional government, while throwing off Hungarian rule, had not yet declared independence from Austria-Hungary. Thus Emperor Karl I's government in Vienna asked the newly formed State of Slovenes, Croats and Serbs for help maintaining the fleet stationed at Pola and keeping order among the navy. The National Council refused to assist unless the Austro-Hungarian Navy was first placed under its command. Emperor Karl I, still attempting to save the Empire from collapse, agreed to the transfer, provided that the other "nations" which made up Austria-Hungary would be able to claim their fair share of the value of the fleet at a later time. All sailors not of Slovene, Croatian, Bosnian, or Serbian background were placed on leave for the time being, while the officers were given the choice of joining the new navy or retiring.

The Austro-Hungarian government thus decided to hand over the bulk of its fleet, preferring to do that rather than give the fleet to the Allies, as the new state had declared its neutrality. Furthermore, the newly formed state had also not yet publicly dethroned Emperor Karl I, keeping the possibility of reforming the Empire into a triple monarchy alive.

=== Post-war ===
On 3 November the Austro-Hungarian government signed the Armistice of Villa Giusti with Italy, ending the fighting along the Italian Front, although it refused to recognize the transfer of Austria-Hungary's warships. As a result, on 4 November, Italian ships sailed into the ports of Trieste, Pola, and Fiume and Italian troops occupied the naval installations at Pola the following day. The National Council did not order any men to resist the Italians, but they also condemned Italy's actions as illegitimate. On 9 November, all remaining ships in Pola harbour had the Italian flag raised. At a conference at Corfu, the Allies agreed the transfer could not be accepted, despite sympathy from the United Kingdom. Faced with the prospect of being given an ultimatum to surrender the former Austro-Hungarian warships, the National Council agreed to hand over the ships beginning on 10 November. When the Allies divided up the Austro-Hungarian Fleet amongst its members in January 1920, Triglav was awarded to Italy. She was commissioned in the Regia Marina with the name Grado in September and was discarded and subsequently scrapped on 30 September 1937.

== Bibliography ==
- Bilzer, Franz F. (1990). Die Torpedoschiffe und Zerstörer der k.u.k. Kriegsmarine 1867–1918 [Torpedo Boats and Destroyers of the Imperial and Royal Navy 1867–1918] (in German). Graz: H. Weishaupt. ISBN 3-9003-1066-1.
- Cernuschi, Enrico & O'Hara, Vincent (2016). "The Naval War in the Adriatic, Part 2: 1917–1918". In Jordan, John (ed.). Warship 2016. London: Conway. pp. 62–75. ISBN 978-1-84486-326-6.
- Dodson, Aidan & Cant, Serena (2020). Spoils of War: The Fate of Enemy Fleets after Two World Wars. Barnsley, UK: Seaforth Publishing. ISBN 978-1-5267-4198-1.
- Fock, Harald (1989). Z-Vor!: Internationale Entwicklung und Kriegseinsätze von Zerstörern und Torpedobooten: 1914 bis 1939 (in German). Herford, Germany: Koelers Verlagsgesellschaft mbH. ISBN 3-7822-0207-4.
- Freivogel, Zvonimir (2021). Austro-Hungarian Destroyers in World War One. Zagreb: Despot Infinitus. ISBN 978-953-366-051-6.
- Greger, René (1976). Austro-Hungarian Warships of World War I. London: Ian Allan. ISBN 0-7110-0623-7.
- Halpern, Paul G. (2004). The Battle of the Otranto Straits: Controlling the Gateway to the Adriatic in World War I. Bloomington, Indiana: Indiana University Press. ISBN 0-253-34379-8.
- Halpern, Paul G. (1987). The Naval War in the Mediterranean 1914–1918. Annapolis, Maryland, US: Naval Institute Press. ISBN 0-87021-448-9.
- Halpern, Paul G. (1994). A Naval History of World War I. Annapolis, Maryland: Naval Institute Press. ISBN 1-55750-352-4.
- Noppen, Ryan K. (2016). Austro-Hungarian Cruisers and Destroyers 1914-18. New Vanguard. Vol. 241. Oxford, UK: Osprey Publishing. ISBN 978-1-4728-1470-8.
- O'Hara, Vincent P. & Heinz, Leonard R. (2017). Clash of Fleets: Naval Battles of the Great War, 1914-18. Annapolis, Maryland: Naval Institute Press. ISBN 978-1-68247-008-4.
- Sieche, Erwin (1985a). "Austria-Hungary". In Gray, Randal (ed.). Conway's All the World's Fighting Ships 1906–1921. Annapolis, Maryland: Naval Institute Press. pp. 326–347. ISBN 0-85177-245-5.
- Sieche, Erwin (1996). Torpedoschiffe und Zerstörer der K. u. K. Marine [Torpedo Boats and Destroyers of the Imperial and Royal Navy]. Marine-Arsenal (in German). Vol. 34. Wölfersheim-Berstadt, Germany: Pozdun-Pallas-Verlag. ISBN 3-7909-0546-1.
- Sieche, Erwin F. (1985b). "Zeittafel der Vorgange rund um die Auflosung und Ubergabe der k.u.k. Kriegsmarine 1918–1923". Marine—Gestern, Heute (in German). 12 (1): 129–141.
- Sokol, Anthony (1968). The Imperial and Royal Austro-Hungarian Navy. Annapolis, Maryland: United States Naval Institute. OCLC 462208412.
- Sondhaus, Lawrence (1994). The Naval Policy of Austria-Hungary, 1867–1918: Navalism, Industrial Development, and the Politics of Dualism. West Lafayette, Indiana: Purdue University Press. ISBN 978-1-55753-034-9.
