= SMS Triglav =

Two ships of the Austrian and Austro-Hungarian Navy have been named SMS Triglav:

- SMS Triglav (1913), a Tátra-class destroyer launched in 1913 and sunk in 1915
- SMS Triglav (1917), an Ersatz Triglav-class destroyer launched in 1917 and ceded to Italy in 1920. Renamed Grado she was scrapped in 1937
