= SMS Orjen =

Austro-Hungarian Tatra-class destroyer

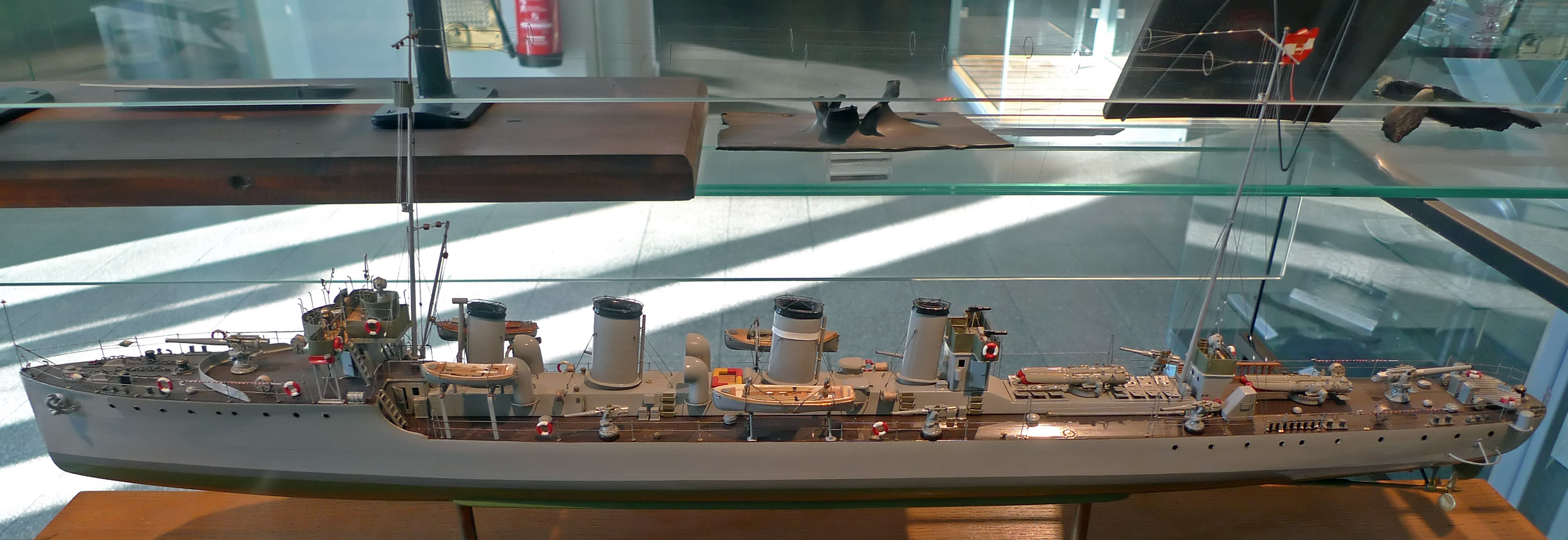
- A model of sister ship SMS Tátra in the Heeresgeschichtliches Museum Wien

History

Austria-Hungary
- Name: Orjen
- Builder: Ganz-Danubius, Porto Ré, Kingdom of Croatia-Slavonia, Austro-Hungarian Empire
- Laid down: 4 September 1912
- Launched: 26 August 1913
- Completed: 11 August 1914
- Fate: Ceded to Italy, 1920

Kingdom of Italy
- Name: Pola
- Acquired: 1920
- Renamed: Zenson, 1931
- Fate: Scrapped, 1937

General characteristics
- Class & type: Tátra-class destroyer
- Displacement: 870 long tons (880 t) (normal); 1,050 long tons (1,070 t) (deep load)
- Length: 83.5 m (273 ft 11 in) (o/a)
- Beam: 7.8 m (25 ft 7 in)
- Draft: 3 m (9 ft 10 in) (deep load)
- Installed power: 6 × Yarrow boilers; 20,600 shp (15,400 kW)
- Propulsion: 2 × shafts; 2 × steam turbines
- Speed: 32.5 knots (60.2 km/h; 37.4 mph)
- Range: 1,600 nmi (3,000 km; 1,800 mi) at 12 knots (22 km/h; 14 mph)
- Complement: 105
- Armament: 2 × single 10 cm (3.9 in) guns; 6 × single 66 mm (2.6 in) guns; 2 × twin 45 cm (17.7 in) torpedo tubes

SMS Orjen (Note: "SMS" stands for "Seiner Majestät Schiff", or "His Majesty's Ship".) was one of six Tátra-class destroyers built for the kaiserliche und königliche Kriegsmarine (Austro-Hungarian Navy) shortly before the First World War. Completed in 1914, she helped to sink an Italian destroyer during the action off Vieste in May 1915 after Italy declared war on Austria-Hungary. Two months later the ship participated in an unsuccessful attempt to recapture a small island in the central Adriatic Sea from the Italians. In November and early December Orjen was one of the ships conducting raids off the Albanian coast to interdict the supply lines between Italy and Albania, although she did not participate in the First Battle of Durazzo in late December. Orjen participated in several raids on the Otranto Barrage in 1916–1917 with limited success. She was transferred to Italy in 1920 in accordance with the peace treaties ending the war and renamed Pola. She mostly served as a training ship or in Italian North Africa when she was not in reserve from 1924 to 1928. Renamed Zenson in 1931, the ship was scrapped in 1937.

== Design and description ==
The Tátra-class destroyers were faster, more powerfully armed and more than twice as large as the preceding Huszár class. The ships had an overall length of 83.5 meters (273 ft 11 in), a beam of 7.8 meters (25 ft 7 in), and a maximum draft of 3 meters (9 ft 10 in). They displaced 870 long tons (880 t) at normal load and 1,050 long tons (1,070 t) at deep load. The ships had a complement of 105 officers and enlisted men.

The Tátras were powered by two AEG-Curtiss steam turbine sets, each driving a single propeller shaft using steam provided by six Yarrow boilers. Four of the boilers were oil-fired while the remaining pair used coal. The turbines, designed to produce 20,600 shaft horsepower (15,400 kW), were intended to give the ships a speed of 32.5 knots (60.2 km/h; 37.4 mph). The ships carried enough oil and coal to give them a range of 1,600 nautical miles (3,000 km; 1,800 mi) at 12 knots (22 km/h; 14 mph).

The main armament of the Tátra-class destroyers consisted of two 50-caliber Škoda Works 10-centimeter (3.9 in) K10 guns, one each fore and aft of the superstructure in single, unprotected mounts. Their secondary armament consisted of six 45-caliber 66-millimeter (2.6 in) guns, two of which were on anti-aircraft mountings. They were also equipped with four 450-millimeter (17.7 in) torpedo tubes in two twin rotating mountings amidships.

== Construction and career ==
Orjen was laid down by Ganz-Danubius at their shipyard in Porto Ré in the Kingdom of Croatia-Slavonia of the Austro-Hungarian Empire on 4 September 1912, launched on 26 August 1913 and completed on 11 August 1914. The Tátra-class ships did not play a significant role in the minor raids and skirmishing in the Adriatic in 1914 and early 1915 between the Entente Cordiale and the Central Powers. From 9 to 24 December, Orjen had her propeller shaft bearings replaced in Pola.

=== Action off Vieste ===
The Kingdom of Italy signed a secret treaty in London in late April 1915 breaking its alliance with the German Empire and Austro-Hungary and promising to declare war on the Central Powers within a month. Austro-Hungarian intelligence discovered this and Admiral Anton Haus, commander of the Austro-Hungarian Navy, planned a massive surprise attack on Italian ports and facilities on the northern Adriatic coast, outside of interception range of the modern ships of the Regia Marina (Royal Italian Navy) stationed at Taranto. To warn of any Italian warships able to interfere with the bombardments, Haus prepositioned three groups of destroyers, each led by a scout cruiser. Placed in the central Adriatic between the island of Pelagosa and the Italian coast, four days prior to the Italian declaration of war on 23 May, were four Tátra-class destroyers, including Orjen, and the cruiser SMS Helgoland. Around midnight on the night of 23/24 May, Haus ordered the reconnaissance groups to move west and attack Italian coastal targets. About an hour later the four Tátras encountered a pair of Italian Nembo-class destroyers, Turbine and Aquilone, but in the darkness they were believed by the Italians to be friendly ships.

The Italian ships separated when Aquilone went to investigate a sighting; Helgoland began bombarding the city of Barletta at 04:00 and the Italian destroyer spotted the cruiser at 04:38. Aquilone turned away to the southeast and was able to disengage without any damage. Turbine, however, encountered Helgoland several minutes later and believed that she was an Italian ship until she was disabused by a salvo from the cruiser. The destroyer turned to the north, towards Vieste, to escape, with Helgoland and Orjen in pursuit. Alerted by Helgoland's commander, Linienschiffskapitän (Captain) Heinrich Seitz, the destroyers SMS Csepel and SMS Tátra, which had been bombarding Manfredonia, moved to intercept and spotted Turbine at 05:10, opening fire at 05:45. The destroyer SMS Lika, which had been bombarding Vieste, was ordered to block her escape to the north while Helgoland stayed to the east to cut off her access to the Adriatic. Lika scored the critical hit of the battle when one of her 66-millimeter shells broke Turbine's steam pipe and caused her to rapidly lose speed. Tátra and Helgoland also scored hits and Turbine was dead in the water with a list when her crew abandoned ship at 06:51. She had hit Tátra and Csepel during the engagement, but failed to inflict any significant damage. The Austro-Hungarians rescued 35 survivors before torpedoing the derelict ship. As they were withdrawing they were engaged by the protected cruiser Libia and the armed merchant cruiser SS Cittá di Siracusa between 07:10 and 07:19. Helgoland was struck by one shell before they were able to disengage from the slower ships.

On 28 July, all six Tátra-class ships and the scout cruisers SMS Saida and Helgoland, reinforced by the German submarine UB-14, attempted to recapture Pelagosa which had been occupied by the Italians on 11 July. Despite a heavy bombardment by the ships, the 108-man landing party was unable to overcome the 90-man garrison and was forced to withdraw. Three weeks later, Saida, Helgoland, Orjen, Lika and two other destroyers bombarded the island, destroying its freshwater cistern, which forced the Italians to withdraw on 18 August.

The Bulgarian declaration of war on Serbia on 14 October cut the existing supply line from Serbia to Salonika, Greece, and forced the Allies to begin supplying Serbia through ports in Albania. This took about a month to work out the details and the Austro-Hungarians took just about as long to decide on a response. Haus ordered Seitz to take Helgoland, Saida and all six Tátra-class destroyers on a reconnaissance mission off the Albanian coast on the night of 22/23 November. They encountered and sank a small cargo ship and a motor schooner carrying flour for Serbia; four Italian destroyers were unable to intercept them before they reached friendly territory. Haus was initially reluctant to send his ships so far south, but an order from the Armeeoberkommando (High Command) on 29 November to patrol the Albanian coast and to disrupt Allied troop movements caused him to transfer Helgoland, her sister SMS Novara and the Tátra-class ships to Cattaro. On 6 December, Helgoland and the Tátras swept down the coast to Durazzo, sinking five motor schooners, including two in Durazzo harbor.

=== 1916–1918 ===
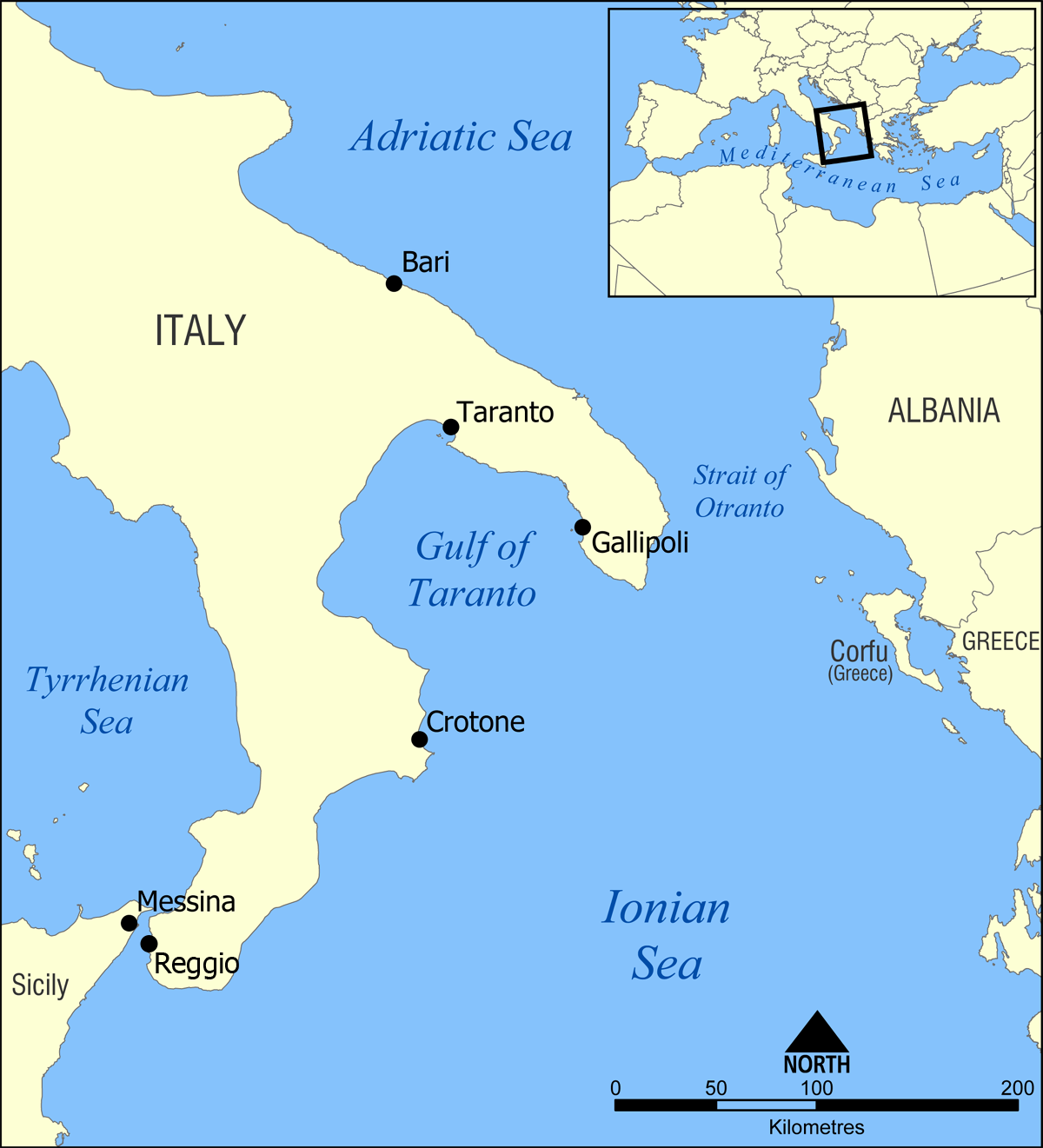
Map showing the location of the Straits of Otranto at the southern end of the Adriatic

On 27 January 1916, Novara, Csepel and Orjen departed Cattaro on a mission to attack the shipping in Durazzo harbor. En route the two sisters accidentally collided with each other and had to return to port although the cruiser continued the mission. The impact bent Orjen's bow and she was under repair until 16 February. The ship made unsuccessful sorties in search of Allied shipping on 23 and 26 February. On the night of 31 May/1 June 1916, Orjen and her sister SMS Balaton, together with three torpedo boats, attacked the Otranto Barrage and sank one of the drifters maintaining it with a torpedo. On 4 July Helgoland, Orjen, Balaton and Tátra raided the barrage, but could not find any targets in the poor visibility. Orjen made another unsuccessful raid on the barrage on the night of 23/24 July. Helgoland and Novara, escorted by Orjen and Balaton, comprised one of two bombardment groups that Haus planned to bombard the Italian coast on 29 August to provoke a reaction by Allied ships that would be ambushed by waiting U-boats. The weather did not cooperate and it was too foggy to see the coast, and all the ships involved returned to harbor without incident. Orjen was refitted in Pola during 1–22 October and spent the rest of the year escorting convoys. On the night of 11/12 March 1917, Orjen, Balaton, Csepel and Tátra swept through the Strait of Otranto, but failed to sink the French cargo ship SS Gorgone that they encountered. From 30 March to 14 May, Orjen had two of her boilers replaced and returned to Cattaro on 17 May. She participated in the unsuccessful search for the missing flying boat K222 on 11 August.

The smaller ships in the Austro-Hungarian Navy were the most active ones and their crews had the highest morale; most of the larger ships did little but swing on their moorings which did nothing to improve the morale of their crews. On 1 February, the Cattaro Mutiny broke out, starting aboard the armored cruiser Sankt Georg. The mutineers rapidly gained control of the armored cruiser Kaiser Karl VI and most of the other major warships in the harbor. Unhappy with the failure of the smaller ships' crews to join the mutiny, the mutineers threatened to fire at any ship that failed to hoist a red flag. Orjen's crew hoisted a flag with the permission of her captain with the proviso that there should be no disturbances aboard ship. The following day, many of the mutinous ships abandoned the effort after coast-defense guns loyal to the government opened fire on the rebel guard ship Kronprinz Erzherzog Rudolf. The scout cruisers and Orjen, among other ships, took advantage of the confusion to rejoin loyalist forces in the inner harbor where they were protected by coastal artillery. The next morning, the Erzherzog Karl-class battleships arrived from Pola and put down the uprising.

=== End of the war ===
By October it had become clear that Austria-Hungary was facing defeat in the war. With various attempts to quell nationalist sentiments failing, Emperor Karl I decided to sever Austria-Hungary's alliance with Germany and appeal to the Allies in an attempt to preserve the empire from complete collapse. On 26 October Austria-Hungary informed Germany that their alliance was over. At the same time, the Austro-Hungarian Navy was in the process of tearing itself apart along ethnic and nationalist lines. Vice Admiral Miklós Horthy was informed on the morning of 28 October that an armistice was imminent, and used this news to maintain order and prevent a mutiny among the fleet. While a mutiny was spared, tensions remained high and morale was at an all-time low.

The following day the National Council in Zagreb announced Croatia's dynastic ties to Hungary had come to an end. This new provisional government, while throwing off Hungarian rule, had not yet declared independence from Austria-Hungary. Thus Emperor Karl I's government in Vienna asked the newly formed State of Slovenes, Croats and Serbs for help maintaining the fleet stationed at Pola and keeping order among the navy. The National Council refused to assist unless the Austro-Hungarian Navy was first placed under its command. Emperor Karl I, still attempting to save the Empire from collapse, agreed to the transfer, provided that the other "nations" which made up Austria-Hungary would be able to claim their fair share of the value of the fleet at a later time. All sailors not of Slovene, Croatian, Bosnian, or Serbian background were placed on leave for the time being, while the officers were given the choice of joining the new navy or retiring.

The Austro-Hungarian government thus decided to hand over the bulk of its fleet, preferring to do that rather than give the fleet to the Allies, as the new state had declared its neutrality. Furthermore, the newly formed state had also not yet publicly repudiated Emperor Karl I, keeping the possibility of reforming the Empire into a triple monarchy alive.

=== Post-war ===
On 3 November the Austro-Hungarian government signed the Armistice of Villa Giusti with Italy, ending the fighting along the Italian Front, although it refused to recognize the transfer of Austria-Hungary's warships. As a result, on 4 November, Italian ships sailed into the ports of Trieste, Pola, and Fiume and Italian troops occupied the naval installations at Pola the following day. The National Council did not order any men to resist the Italians, but they also condemned Italy's actions as illegitimate. On 9 November, all remaining ships in Pola harbour had the Italian flag raised. At a conference at Corfu, the Allies agreed the transfer could not be accepted, despite sympathy from the United Kingdom. Faced with the prospect of being given an ultimatum to surrender the former Austro-Hungarian warships, the National Council agreed to hand over the ships beginning on 10 November.

When the Allies divided up the Austro-Hungarian Fleet amongst themselves in January 1920, Orjen was awarded to Italy. She was commissioned in the Regia Marina with the name Pola on 26 September, refitted and was assigned to the Venetian squadron from March 1922 where she made training cruises with machine engineering students to the Eastern Mediterranean. The ship was reduced to reserve in Taranto from 1924 to 1928 and was recommissioned for service in Libya in March 1928. Pola was reassigned to the Venetian squadron in 1929 before returning to Libya the following year. The ship was renamed Zenson on 9 April 1931 and cruised the Aegean Sea in 1931 and 1932. The ship was discarded on 1 May 1937 and subsequently scrapped.

== Bibliography ==
- Bilzer, Franz F. (1990). Die Torpedoschiffe und Zerstörer der k.u.k. Kriegsmarine 1867–1918. Graz: H. Weishaupt. ISBN 3-9003-1066-1.
- Cernuschi, Enrico & O'Hara, Vincent (2015). "The Naval War in the Adriatic Part 1: 1914–1916". In Jordan, John (ed.). Warship 2015. London: Conway. pp. 161–173. ISBN 978-1-84486-276-4.
- Cernuschi, Enrico & O'Hara, Vincent (2016). "The Naval War in the Adriatic, Part 2: 1917–1918". In Jordan, John (ed.). Warship 2016. London: Conway. pp. 62–75. ISBN 978-1-84486-326-6.
- Greger, René (1976). Austro-Hungarian Warships of World War I. London: Ian Allan. ISBN 0-7110-0623-7.
- Halpern, Paul G. (2004). The Battle of the Otranto Straits: Controlling the Gateway to the Adriatic in World War I. Bloomington, Indiana: Indiana University Press. ISBN 0-253-34379-8.
- Halpern, Paul G. (1994). A Naval History of World War I. Annapolis, Maryland: Naval Institute Press. ISBN 1-55750-352-4.
- Noppen, Ryan K. (2016). Austro-Hungarian Cruisers and Destroyers 1914-18. New Vanguard. Vol. 241. Oxford, UK: Osprey Publishing. ISBN 978-1-4728-1470-8.
- O'Hara, Vincent P. & Heinz, Leonard R. (2017). Clash of Fleets: Naval Battles of the Great War, 1914-18. Annapolis, Maryland: Naval Institute Press. ISBN 978-1-68247-008-4.
- Sieche, Erwin (1985). "Austria-Hungary". In Gardiner, Robert & Gray, Randal (eds.). Conway's All the World's Fighting Ships 1906–1921. Annapolis, Maryland: Naval Institute Press. ISBN 0-85177-245-5.
- Sieche, Erwin F. (1985). "Zeittafel der Vorgange rund um die Auflosung und Ubergabe der k.u.k. Kriegsmarine 1918–1923". Marine—Gestern, Heute (in German). 12 (1): 129–141. OCLC 648103394.
- Sokol, Anthony (1968). The Imperial and Royal Austro-Hungarian Navy. Annapolis, Maryland: United States Naval Institute. OCLC 462208412.
- Sondhaus, Lawrence (1994). The Naval Policy of Austria-Hungary, 1867–1918: Navalism, Industrial Development, and the Politics of Dualism. West Lafayette, Indiana: Purdue University Press. ISBN 978-1-55753-034-9.
