= SMS Balaton =

Austro-Hungarian Tatra-class destroyer

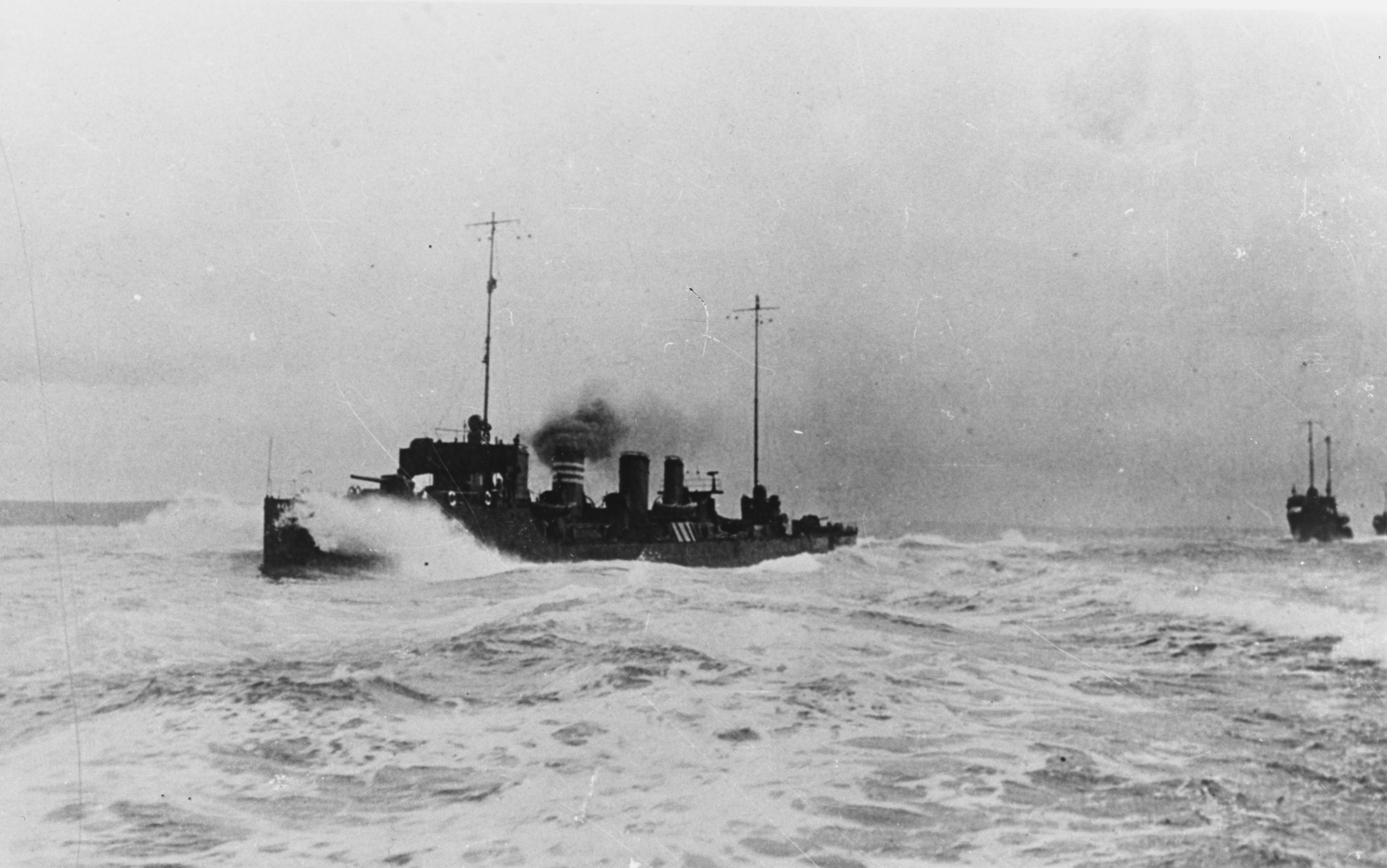
- Balaton at sea

History

Austria-Hungary
- Name: Balaton
- Builder: Ganz-Danubius, Porto Ré, Kingdom of Croatia-Slavonia, Austro-Hungarian Empire
- Laid down: 6 November 1911
- Launched: 16 November 1912
- Completed: 3 November 1913
- Fate: Ceded to Italy, 1920

Kingdom of Italy
- Name: Zenson
- Acquired: 1920
- Fate: Scrapped, 1923
- Notes: Used solely as a source of spare parts

General characteristics
- Class & type: Tátra-class destroyer
- Displacement: 870 long tons (880 t) (normal); 1,050 long tons (1,070 t) (deep load)
- Length: 83.5 m (273 ft 11 in) (o/a)
- Beam: 7.8 m (25 ft 7 in)
- Draft: 3 m (9 ft 10 in) (deep load)
- Installed power: 6 × Yarrow boilers; 20,600 shp (15,400 kW)
- Propulsion: 2 × shafts; 2 × steam turbines
- Speed: 32.5 knots (60.2 km/h; 37.4 mph)
- Range: 1,600 nmi (3,000 km; 1,800 mi) at 12 knots (22 km/h; 14 mph)
- Complement: 105
- Armament: 2 × single 10 cm (3.9 in) guns; 6 × single 66 mm (2.6 in) guns; 2 × twin 45 cm (17.7 in) torpedo tubes

SMS Balaton (Note: "SMS" stands for "Seiner Majestät Schiff", or "His Majesty's Ship".) was one of six Tátra-class destroyers built for the kaiserliche und königliche Kriegsmarine (Austro-Hungarian Navy) shortly before the First World War. Completed in 1913, she did not participate in the attacks on the Italian mainland after Italy declared war on Austria-Hungary in May 1915. Two months later the ship bombarded a small island in the Central Adriatic Sea during an unsuccessful attempt to recapture it from the Italians. In November and early December Balaton was one of the ships conducting raids off the Albanian coast to interdict the supply lines between Italy and Albania. She played a minor role in the 1st Battle of Durazzo in late December. Balaton participated in several unsuccessful raids on the Otranto Barrage in 1917, although she sank an ammunition ship during the Battle of the Strait of Otranto. She was transferred to Italy in 1920 in accordance with the peace treaties ending the war and renamed Zenson. The Regia Marina (Royal Italian Navy) used her for spare parts; she was discarded in 1923 and subsequently scrapped.

== Design and description ==
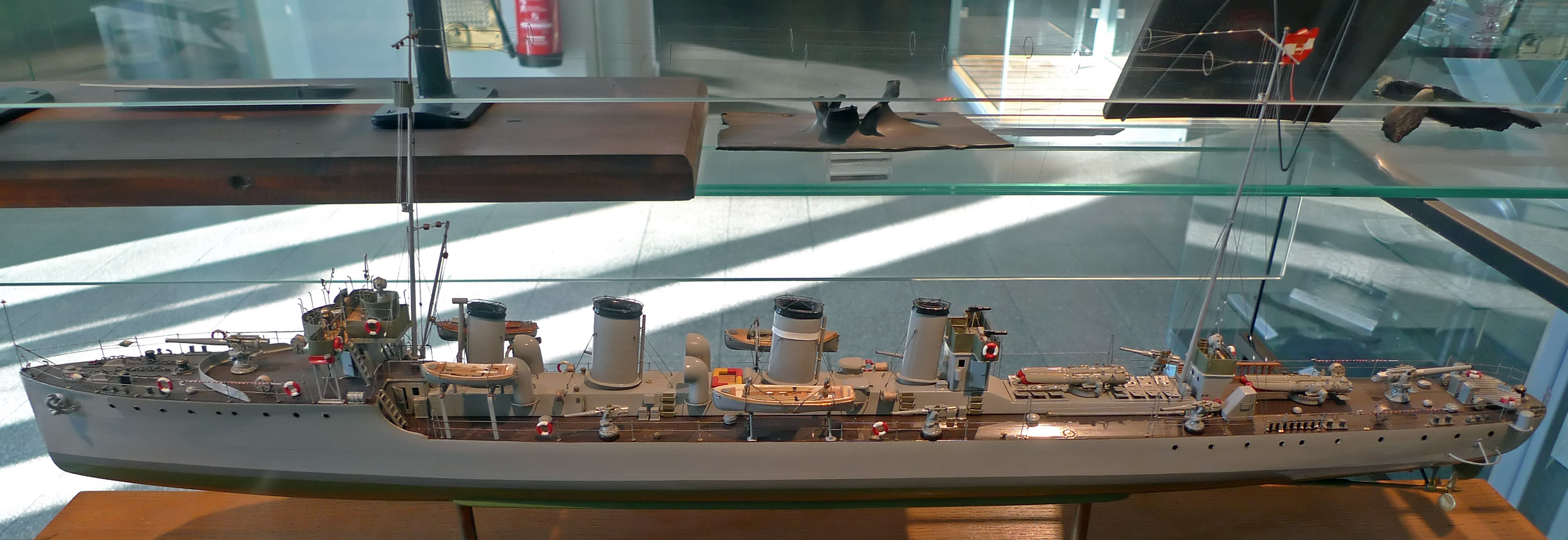
A model of sister ship SMS Tátra in the Heeresgeschichtliches Museum Wien

The Tátra-class destroyers were faster, more powerfully armed and more than twice as large as the preceding Huszár class. The ships had an overall length of 83.5 meters (273 ft 11 in), a beam of 7.8 meters (25 ft 7 in), and a maximum draft of 3 meters (9 ft 10 in). They displaced 870 long tons (880 t) at normal load and 1,050 long tons (1,070 t) at deep load. The ships had a complement of 105 officers and enlisted men.

The Tátras were powered by two AEG-Curtiss steam turbine sets, each driving a single propeller shaft using steam provided by six Yarrow boilers. Four of the boilers were oil-fired while the remaining pair used coal. The turbines, designed to produce 20,600 shaft horsepower (15,400 kW), were intended to give the ships a speed of 32.5 knots (60.2 km/h; 37.4 mph). The ships carried enough oil and coal to give them a range of 1,600 nautical miles (3,000 km; 1,800 mi) at 12 knots (22 km/h; 14 mph).

The main armament of the Tátra-class destroyers consisted of two 50-caliber Škoda Works 10-centimeter (3.9 in) K10 guns, one each fore and aft of the superstructure in single mounts. Their secondary armament consisted of six 45-caliber 66-millimeter (2.6 in) guns, two of which were on anti-aircraft mountings. They were also equipped with four 450-millimeter (17.7 in) torpedo tubes in two twin rotating mountings amidships.

== Construction and career ==
Balaton was laid down by Ganz-Danubius at their shipyard in Porto Ré in the Kingdom of Croatia-Slavonia of the Austro-Hungarian Empire on 6 November 1911, launched on 16 November 1912 and completed on 3 November 1913. The Tátra-class ships did not play a significant role in the minor raids and skirmishing in the Adriatic in 1914 and early 1915 between the Entente Cordiale and the Central Powers. On 13 August 1914, Balaton helped to rescue survivors from the Austro-Hungarian passenger ship SS Baron Gautsch after it had blundered into a minefield and sunk.

On 23 July the scout cruisers SMS Saida and SMS Helgoland, escorted by Balaton, her sisters SMS Csepel and SMS Tátra and three other destroyers bombarded the towns of Termoli, Ortona and San Benedetto del Tronto while a landing party cut the telegraph cable in Tremiti. On 28 July, all six Tátra-class ships and the same pair of cruisers, reinforced by the German submarine UB-14, attempted to recapture Pelagosa. Despite a heavy bombardment by the ships, the 108-man landing party was unable to overcome the 90-man garrison and was forced to withdraw.

The Bulgarian declaration of war on Serbia on 14 October cut the existing supply line from Serbia to Salonika, Greece, and forced the Allies to begin supplying Serbia through ports in Albania. This took about a month to work out the details and the Austro-Hungarians took just about as long to decide on a response. Admiral Anton Haus, commander of the Austro-Hungarian Navy, ordered Linienschiffskapitän (Captain) Heinrich Seitz, Helgoland's commander, to take his ship, Saida and all six Tátra-class destroyers on a reconnaissance mission off the Albanian coast on the night of 22/23 November. They encountered and sank a small cargo ship and a motor schooner carrying flour for Serbia; four Italian destroyers were unable to intercept them before they reached friendly territory. Haus was initially reluctant to send his ships so far south, but an order from the Armeeoberkommando (High Command) on 29 November to patrol the Albanian coast and to disrupt Allied troop movements caused him to transfer Helgoland, her sister SMS Novara and the Tátra-class ships to Cattaro. On 6 December, Helgoland and the Tátras swept down the coast to Durazzo, sinking five motor schooners, including two in Durazzo harbor.

=== 1st Battle of Durazzo ===
Austro-Hungarian aircraft spotted a pair of Italian destroyers in Durazzo harbor on 28 December and Haus dispatched Seitz to take Helgoland, Balaton, Csepel, Tátra and their sisters SMS Triglav and SMS Lika south and search the area between Durazzo and Brindisi for them. If they were not found he was to arrive at Durazzo at dawn and destroy any ships found there. Seitz's ships sailed later that day and Balaton sank the French submarine Monge at 02:35, rescuing two officers and 18 seamen afterwards. He was unable to find the destroyers and dutifully arrived off Durazzo at dawn. At 07:30 he ordered four of his destroyers into the harbor to sink the cargo ship and two schooners anchored there while Helgoland engaged the coastal artillery defending the port and Balaton patrolled the seaward flank. A well-camouflaged 75-millimeter (3 in) artillery battery opened fire at 08:00 at point-blank range. While maneuvering to avoid its fire, Lika and Triglav entered a minefield. After striking two mines in quick succession, Lika sank at 08:03 and Triglav was crippled when her boiler rooms flooded after hitting one mine.Tátra was finally successful in securing a tow on Triglav at 09:30, but was limited to a speed of six knots (11 km/h; 6.9 mph) when Seitz led his ships northwards. He radioed for assistance at 10:35 and was informed an hour later that the armored cruiser SMS Kaiser Karl VI and four torpedo boats were en route to support him.

Italian observers had spotted Seitz's ships at 07:00 and the Allied quick-reaction force of the British light cruiser HMS Dartmouth and the Italian scout cruiser Quarto, escorted by five French destroyers, sortied in an attempt to cut off the Austro-Hungarian ships from their base at Cattaro. These were followed two hours later by the Italian scout cruiser Nino Bixio, the British light cruiser HMS Weymouth and four Italian destroyers. Seitz had ordered Triglav's crew taken off before any of the columns of smoke from these ships were spotted by his ships and he ordered Tátra to drop her tow at 13:15 and abandon Triglav. Five minutes later the Austro-Hungarian ships were spotted and the French destroyers were ordered to deal with Triglav at 13:38 while the cruisers pursued Seitz's ships.

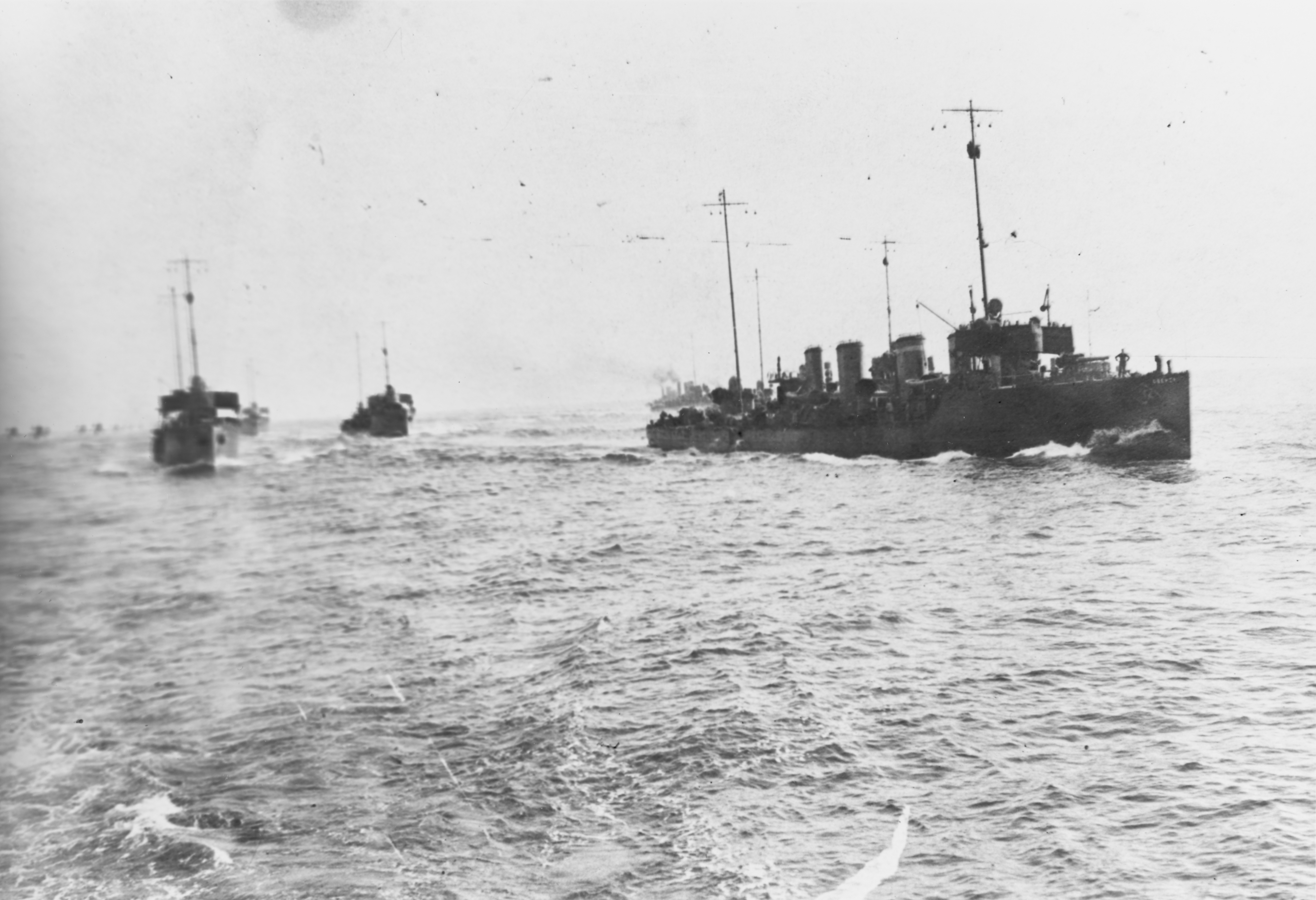
Csepel on the right, followed by Balaton and Tátra, returning after the 1st Battle of Durazzo, 30 December 1915

Seitz turned southwest at 29 knots (54 km/h; 33 mph) to put as much distance between his ships and their pursuers although Dartmouth opened fire at her maximum range of 13,000 meters (14,000 yd) at 13:43 and scored her first hit on Helgoland twelve minutes later. The destroyers were generally not engaged during this battle, being further away, although Csepel was hit once with little effect. Despite further hits on the cruiser which reduced her speed to 27 knots (50 km/h; 31 mph) the Austro-Hungarians were able to disengage before reaching the Italian coast when darkness fell around 17:30 and they reached Šibenik safely.

Balaton was refitting in Pola from 1 January to 11 February 1916. On the night of 31 May/1 June, Balaton and her sister SMS Orjen, together with three torpedo boats, attacked the Otranto Barrage and sank one of the drifters maintaining it with a torpedo. On 4 July Helgoland, Balaton, Orjen and Tátra raided the barrage, but could not find any targets in the poor visibility. Helgoland and Novara, escorted by Balaton and Orjen, comprised one of two bombardment groups that Haus planned to bombard the Italian coast on 29 August to provoke a reaction by Allied ships that would be ambushed by waiting U-boats. The weather did not cooperate and it was too foggy to see the coast and all the ships involved returned to harbor without incident. On the night of 11/12 March 1917, Balaton, Orjen, Csepel and Tátra swept through the Strait of Otranto, but failed to sink the French cargo ship SS Gorgone that they encountered.

=== Battle of the Strait of Otranto ===
On the night of 14/15 May, Balaton and Csepel departed Cattaro with orders to search off the Albanian coast and the Strait of Otranto for Allied shipping. They were intended to act as a diversion for the attack by the three Novara-class scout cruisers on the barrage. The destroyers encountered a convoy of three merchant ships, escorted by the Italian destroyer Borea, at 03:10. Csepel lit up Borea with her searchlight at 03:24 and opened fire immediately afterward, hitting the Italian ship four times in rapid succession. One of the hits broke her main steam pipe which caused her to slow to a stop and the others set her on fire; she sank shortly before dawn. Balaton fired at the 1,657 gross register tons (GRT) SS Carroccio which blew up when her cargo of ammunition exploded. The destroyers engaged the other two ships, setting one on fire and slightly damaging the other one, after which they disengaged and headed north at 25 knots (46 km/h; 29 mph).

Italian observers reported this action at 03:48 and the patrolling Italian scout cruiser Carlo Mirabello and her escorting trio of French destroyers were alerted at 04:35 and turned south to intercept. They did not spot the Austro-Hungarian ships, but another group of Allied ships did at 07:45. This group consisted of two British light cruisers, the brand-new Italian scout cruiser Aquila and four Italian destroyers under the command of Rear Admiral Alfredo Acton. He ordered Aquila and the destroyers to investigate five minutes later as the Austro-Hungarian ships turned away towards Durazzo. The scout cruiser was the fastest ship in the Italian fleet and she opened fire at 08:15 at a range of 11,400 meters (12,500 yd) while closing the range to 9,600 meters (10,500 yd) before Csepel hit her once at 08:32; severing her main steam line and causing her to lose power. The destroyers continued the pursuit, but broke off when shells from Durazzo's coastal artillery began dropping around them around 09:05. After the Italian ships were moving to rejoin Acton's force at 09:18, Balaton and Csepel turned towards Cattaro, evading an attack by the French submarine Bernoulli en route. During the battle, Balaton fired 85 rounds from her main guns, 60 shells from her secondary armament and two torpedoes.

Helgoland and all of the Tátras attempted to duplicate the success of the earlier raid on 18–19 October, but they were spotted by Italian aircraft and turned back in the face of substantial Allied reinforcements alerted by the aircraft. On the night of 13 December, Balaton, Tátra and Csepel raided the Otranto Barrage, but disengaged after firing torpedoes at what they believed to be four Allied destroyers, although there is no record of any attacks that night in Allied records.

The smaller ships in the Austro-Hungarian Navy were the most active ones and their crews had the highest morale; most of the larger ships did little but swing on their moorings which did nothing to improve the morale of their crews. On 1 February, the Cattaro Mutiny broke out, starting aboard the armored cruiser Sankt Georg. The mutineers rapidly gained control of the armored cruiser Kaiser Karl VI and most of the other major warships in the harbor. Unhappy with the failure of the smaller ships' crews to join the mutiny, the mutineers threatened to fire at any ship that failed to hoist a red flag. Balaton's crew hoisted a flag with the permission of her captain with the proviso that there should be no disturbances aboard ship. The following day, many of the mutinous ships abandoned the effort after coast-defense guns loyal to the government opened fire on the rebel guard ship Kronprinz Erzherzog Rudolf. The scout cruisers and Balaton, among other ships, took advantage of the confusion to rejoin loyalist forces in the inner harbor where they were protected by coastal artillery. The next morning, the Erzherzog Karl-class battleships arrived from Pola and put down the uprising.

On the night of 1/2 July, Balaton, the destroyer SMS Csikós and two torpedo boats were at sea to support an air raid on Venice. They were spotted by a group of seven Italian destroyers south of Caorle and they fought a brief battle with the Italians before disengaging. Both Balaton and Csikós were hit once during the engagement. Balaton began a refit at Pola on 12 September.

=== End of the war ===
By October it had become clear that Austria-Hungary was facing defeat in the war. With various attempts to quell nationalist sentiments failing, Emperor Karl I decided to sever Austria-Hungary's alliance with Germany and appeal to the Allies in an attempt to preserve the empire from complete collapse. On 26 October Austria-Hungary informed Germany that their alliance was over. At the same time, the Austro-Hungarian Navy was in the process of tearing itself apart along ethnic and nationalist lines. Vice Admiral Miklós Horthy was informed on the morning of 28 October that an armistice was imminent, and used this news to maintain order and prevent a mutiny among the fleet. While a mutiny was spared, tensions remained high and morale was at an all-time low.

The following day the National Council in Zagreb announced Croatia's dynastic ties to Hungary had come to an end. This new provisional government, while throwing off Hungarian rule, had not yet declared independence from Austria-Hungary. Thus Emperor Karl I's government in Vienna asked the newly formed State of Slovenes, Croats and Serbs for help maintaining the fleet stationed at Pola and keeping order among the navy. The National Council refused to assist unless the Austro-Hungarian Navy was first placed under its command. Emperor Karl I, still attempting to save the Empire from collapse, agreed to the transfer, provided that the other "nations" which made up Austria-Hungary would be able to claim their fair share of the value of the fleet at a later time. All sailors not of Slovene, Croatian, Bosnian, or Serbian background were placed on leave for the time being, while the officers were given the choice of joining the new navy or retiring.

The Austro-Hungarian government thus decided to hand over the bulk of its fleet, preferring to do that rather than give the fleet to the Allies, as the new state had declared its neutrality. Furthermore, the newly formed state had also not yet publicly dethroned Emperor Karl I, keeping the possibility of reforming the Empire into a triple monarchy alive.

=== Post-war ===
On 3 November the Austro-Hungarian government signed the Armistice of Villa Giusti with Italy, ending the fighting along the Italian Front, although it refused to recognize the transfer of Austria-Hungary's warships. As a result, on 4 November, Italian ships sailed into the ports of Trieste, Pola, and Fiume and Italian troops occupied the naval installations at Pola the following day. The National Council did not order any men to resist the Italians, but they also condemned Italy's actions as illegitimate. On 9 November, all remaining ships in Pola harbour had the Italian flag raised. At a conference at Corfu, the Allies agreed the transfer could not be accepted, despite sympathy from the United Kingdom. Faced with the prospect of being given an ultimatum to surrender the former Austro-Hungarian warships, the National Council agreed to hand over the ships beginning on 10 November. When the Allies divided up the Austro-Hungarian Fleet amongst its members in January 1920, Balaton was awarded to Italy. She was commissioned in the Regia Marina with the name Zenson on 27 September, but was discarded and subsequently scrapped on 5 July 1923 after having been cannibalized to provide spare parts for her sisters.

== Bibliography ==
- Bilzer, Franz F. (1990). Die Torpedoschiffe und Zerstörer der k.u.k. Kriegsmarine 1867–1918. Graz: H. Weishaupt. ISBN 3-9003-1066-1.
- Cernuschi, Enrico & O'Hara, Vincent (2015). "The Naval War in the Adriatic Part 1: 1914–1916". In Jordan, John (ed.). Warship 2015. London: Conway. pp. 161–173. ISBN 978-1-84486-276-4.
- Cernuschi, Enrico & O'Hara, Vincent (2016). "The Naval War in the Adriatic, Part 2: 1917–1918". In Jordan, John (ed.). Warship 2016. London: Conway. pp. 62–75. ISBN 978-1-84486-326-6.
- Dodson, Aidan & Cant, Serena (2020). Spoils of War: The Fate of Enemy Fleets after Two World Wars. Barnsley, UK: Seaforth Publishing. ISBN 978-1-5267-4198-1.
- Greger, René (1976). Austro-Hungarian Warships of World War I. London: Ian Allan. ISBN 0-7110-0623-7.
- Halpern, Paul G. (2004a). The Battle of the Otranto Straits: Controlling the Gateway to the Adriatic in World War I. Bloomington, Indiana: Indiana University Press. ISBN 0-253-34379-8.
- Halpern, Paul (2004b). "The Cattaro Mutiny, 1918". In Bell, Christopher M.; Elleman, Bruce A. (eds.). Naval Mutinies of the Twentieth Century: An International Perspective. London: Frank Cass. pp. 45–65. ISBN 0-7146-5460-4.
- Halpern, Paul G. (1994). A Naval History of World War I. Annapolis, Maryland: Naval Institute Press. ISBN 1-55750-352-4.
- Noppen, Ryan K. (2016). Austro-Hungarian Cruisers and Destroyers 1914-18. New Vanguard. Vol. 241. Oxford, UK: Osprey Publishing. ISBN 978-1-4728-1470-8.
- O'Hara, Vincent P. & Heinz, Leonard R. (2017). Clash of Fleets: Naval Battles of the Great War, 1914-18. Annapolis, Maryland: Naval Institute Press. ISBN 978-1-68247-008-4.
- Sieche, Erwin (1985a). "Austria-Hungary". In Gardiner, Robert & Gray, Randal (eds.). Conway's All the World's Fighting Ships 1906–1921. Annapolis, Maryland: Naval Institute Press. ISBN 0-85177-245-5.
- Sieche, Erwin F. (1985b). "Zeittafel der Vorgange rund um die Auflosung und Ubergabe der k.u.k. Kriegsmarine 1918–1923". Marine—Gestern, Heute (in German). 12 (1): 129–141.
- Sokol, Anthony (1968). The Imperial and Royal Austro-Hungarian Navy. Annapolis, Maryland: United States Naval Institute. OCLC 462208412.
- Sondhaus, Lawrence (1994). The Naval Policy of Austria-Hungary, 1867–1918: Navalism, Industrial Development, and the Politics of Dualism. West Lafayette, Indiana: Purdue University Press. ISBN 978-1-55753-034-9.
