= Ersatz Triglav-class destroyer =

Class overview
- Name: Ersatz Triglav class
- Builders: Ganz-Danubius, Fiume/Porto Ré, Kingdom of Croatia-Slavonia, Kingdom of Hungary, Austro-Hungarian Empire
- Operators: Austro-Hungarian Navy; Regia Marina; French Navy
- Preceded by: Tátra class
- Succeeded by: None
- Built: 1916–1918
- In service: 1917–1939
- In commission: 1917–1939
- Completed: 4
- Scrapped: 4

General characteristics
- Type: Destroyer
- Displacement: 880 t (870 long tons) (normal); 1,050 t (1,030 long tons) (deep load)
- Length: 85.28 m (279 ft 9 in) (o/a)
- Beam: 7.8 m (25 ft 7 in)
- Draft: 3.2 m (10 ft 6 in) (deep load)
- Installed power: 6 × Yarrow boilers; 20,650 shp (15,400 kW)
- Propulsion: 2 × shafts; 2 × steam turbines
- Speed: 32.6 knots (60.4 km/h; 37.5 mph)
- Range: 500 nmi (930 km; 580 mi) at full speed
- Complement: 114
- Armament: 2 × single 10 cm (3.9 in) guns; 4 × single 66 mm (2.6 in) guns; 2 × single 66 mm AA guns; 2 × twin 45 cm (17.7 in) torpedo tubes

The Ersatz (Replacement) Triglav class consisted of four destroyers built for the Austro-Hungarian Navy during the First World War. Completed late in the war, they saw little action; three ships were seized by Italy and one by France as war reparations in 1920.

== Background and description ==
The loss of two Tátra-class destroyers in the 1st Battle of Durazzo in 1915 caused the Austro-Hungarian Navy to begin construction of four improved versions of the Tátras the following year named Triglav, Lika, Dukla and Uzsok.

The Ersatz Triglav-class ships were slightly longer than the Tátras with an overall length of 85.28 meters (279 ft 9 in), a beam of 7.8 meters (25 ft 7 in), and a maximum draft of 3.2 meters (10 ft 6 in). They displaced 880 metric tons (870 long tons) at normal load and 1,050 metric tons (1,030 long tons) at deep load. The ships had a complement of 114 officers and enlisted men.

The destroyers were powered by two AEG-Curtiss steam turbine sets, each driving a single 2.52-meter (8 ft 3 in) propeller using steam provided by six Yarrow boilers. Four of the boilers were oil-fired while the remaining pair used coal, although oil was sprayed onto the coal to increase power. The turbines, designed to produce 20,650 shaft horsepower (15,400 kW), were intended to give the ships a speed of 32.6 knots (60.4 km/h; 37.5 mph). Dukla was the fastest ship of the class at 33.8 knots (62.6 km/h; 38.9 mph). The ships carried 142.7 metric tons (140 long tons) of oil and 108 metric tons (106 long tons) of coal which gave them a range of 500 nautical miles (930 km; 580 mi) at full speed.

The main armament of the Ersatz Triglav-class destroyers consisted of two 50-caliber Škoda Works 10-centimeter (3.9 in) K11 guns, one each fore and aft of the superstructure in single mounts. Their secondary armament consisted of four 45-caliber 66-millimeter (2.6 in) K09 TAG (German: Torpedoboot-Abwehr Geschütz (anti-torpedo boat guns)). Two additional guns were placed on anti-aircraft mountings. They were also equipped with four 450-millimeter (17.7 in) torpedo tubes in two twin rotating mountings aft of the funnels. Two spare torpedoes were stored on the main deck.

After the war, three vessels—Triglav, Lika, and Uzsok—were ceded to Italy and one, Dukla, to France. The last vessels were scrapped in 1939.

== Ships ==
Construction data
Name	Builder	Laid down	Launched	Completed	Commissioned
SMS Triglav	Ganz-Danubius, Fiume	24 August 1916	24 February 1917	9 June 1917	27 July 1917
SMS Lika	Ganz-Danubius, Fiume	24 August 1916	8 May 1917	6 August 1917	5 September 1917
SMS Dukla	Ganz-Danubius, Porto Ré	11 September 1916	18 July 1917	8 October 1917	7 November 1917
SMS Uzsok	Ganz-Danubius, Fiume	25 September 1916	26 September 1917	18 December 1917	25 January 1918

== Bibliography ==
- Bilzer, Franz F. (1990). Die Torpedoschiffe und Zerstörer der k.u.k. Kriegsmarine 1867–1918 [Torpedo Boats and Destroyers of the Imperial and Royal Navy 1867–1918] (in German). Graz: H. Weishaupt. ISBN 3-9003-1066-1.
- Cernuschi, Enrico & O'Hara, Vincent (2016). "The Naval War in the Adriatic, Part 2: 1917–1918". In Jordan, John (ed.). Warship 2016. London: Conway. pp. 62–75. ISBN 978-1-84486-326-6.
- Dodson, Aidan & Cant, Serena (2020). Spoils of War: The Fate of Enemy Fleets after Two World Wars. Barnsley, UK: Seaforth Publishing. ISBN 978-1-5267-4198-1.
- Freivogel, Zvonimir (2021). Austro-Hungarian Destroyers in World War One. Zagreb: Despot Infinitus. ISBN 978-953-366-051-6.
- Friedman, Norman (2011). Naval Weapons of World War One: Guns, Torpedoes, Mines and ASW Weapons of All Nations; An Illustrated Directory. Barnsley, UK: Seaforth Publishing. ISBN 978-1-84832-100-7.
- Greger, René (1976). Austro-Hungarian Warships of World War I. London: Ian Allan. ISBN 0-7110-0623-7.
- Halpern, Paul G. (2004). The Battle of the Otranto Straits: Controlling the Gateway to the Adriatic in World War I. Bloomington, Indiana: Indiana University Press. ISBN 0-253-34379-8.
- Halpern, Paul G. (1994). A Naval History of World War I. Annapolis, Maryland: Naval Institute Press. ISBN 1-55750-352-4.
- Noppen, Ryan K. (2016). Austro-Hungarian Cruisers and Destroyers 1914-18. New Vanguard. Vol. 241. Oxford, UK: Osprey Publishing. ISBN 978-1-4728-1470-8.
- O'Hara, Vincent P. & Heinz, Leonard R. (2017). Clash of Fleets: Naval Battles of the Great War, 1914-18. Annapolis, Maryland: Naval Institute Press. ISBN 978-1-68247-008-4.
- Roberts, John (1980). "Italy". In Chesneau, Roger (ed.). Conway's All the World's Fighting Ships 1922–1946. New York: Mayflower Books. pp. 280–317. ISBN 0-8317-0303-2.
- Sieche, Erwin (1985a). "Austria-Hungary". In Gray, Randal (ed.). Conway's All the World's Fighting Ships 1906–1921. Annapolis, Maryland: Naval Institute Press. pp. 326–347. ISBN 0-85177-245-5.
- Sieche, Erwin (1996). Torpedoschiffe und Zerstörer der K. u. K. Marine [Torpedo Boats and Destroyers of the Imperial and Royal Navy]. Marine-Arsenal (in German). Vol. 34. Wölfersheim-Berstadt, Germany: Pozdun-Pallas-Verlag. ISBN 3-7909-0546-1.
- Sieche, Erwin F. (1985b). "Zeittafel der Vorgange rund um die Auflosung und Ubergabe der k.u.k. Kriegsmarine 1918–1923". Marine—Gestern, Heute (in German). 12 (1): 129–141.
- Sokol, Anthony (1968). The Imperial and Royal Austro-Hungarian Navy. Annapolis, Maryland: United States Naval Institute. OCLC 462208412.
- Sondhaus, Lawrence (1994). The Naval Policy of Austria-Hungary, 1867–1918: Navalism, Industrial Development, and the Politics of Dualism. West Lafayette, Indiana: Purdue University Press. ISBN 978-1-55753-034-9.
- Vego, Milan (1982). "The Yugoslav Navy 1918–1941". Warship International. XIX (4): 342–361. ISSN 0043-0374.
