= SMS Triglav (1913) =

Austro-Hungarian Tatra-class destroyer

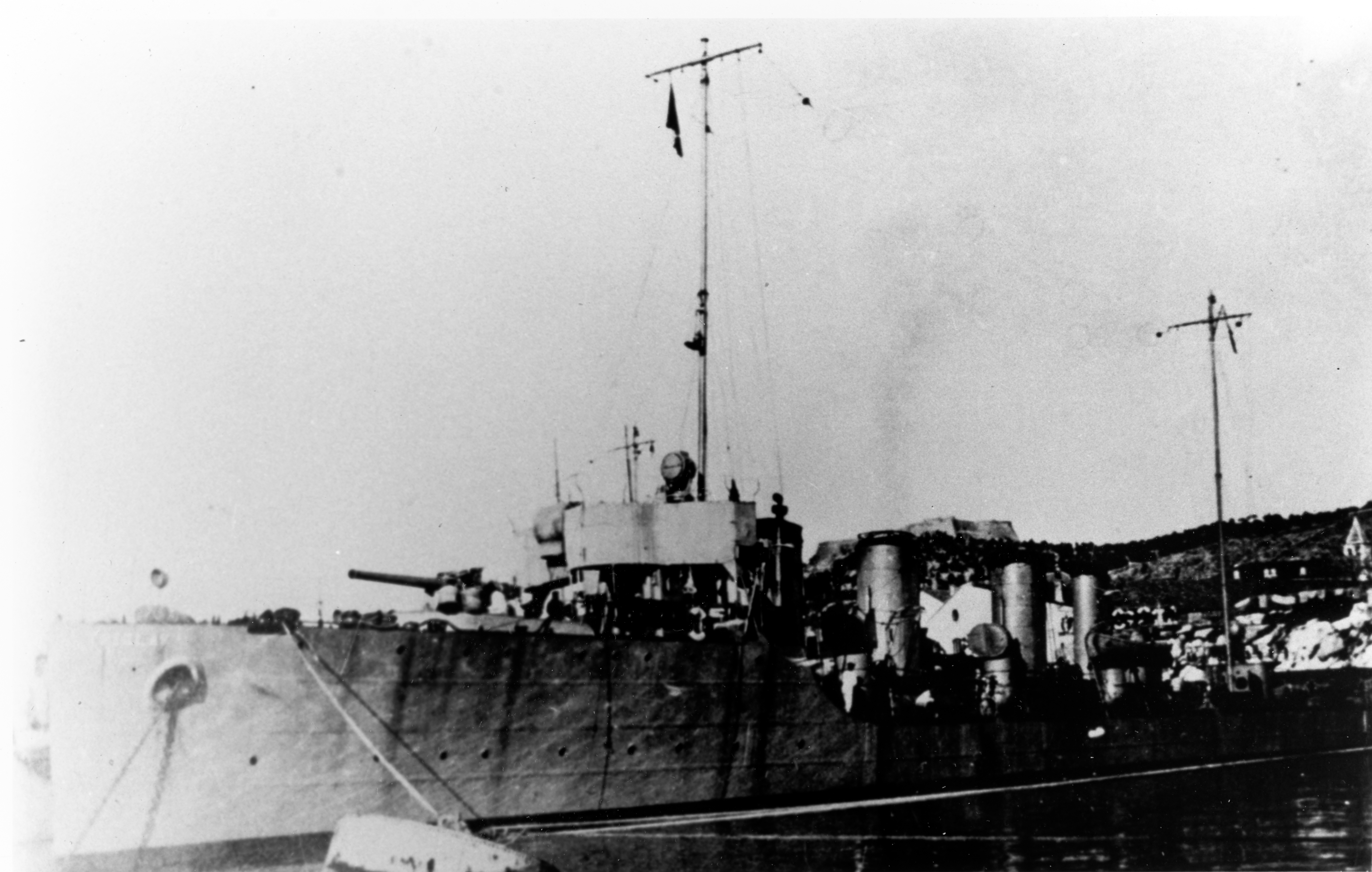
- Triglav in port, 1915

History

Austria-Hungary
- Name: Triglav
- Builder: Ganz-Danubius, Porto Ré, Kingdom of Croatia-Slavonia, Austro-Hungarian Empire
- Laid down: 1 August 1912
- Launched: 22 December 1913
- Completed: 8 August 1914
- Fate: Sunk during the 1st Battle of Durazzo, 29 December 1915

General characteristics
- Class & type: Tátra-class destroyer
- Displacement: 870 long tons (880 t) (normal); 1,050 long tons (1,070 t) (deep load)
- Length: 83.5 m (273 ft 11 in) (o/a)
- Beam: 7.8 m (25 ft 7 in)
- Draft: 3 m (9 ft 10 in) (deep load)
- Installed power: 6 × Yarrow boilers; 20,600 shp (15,400 kW)
- Propulsion: 2 × shafts; 2 × steam turbines
- Speed: 32.5 knots (60.2 km/h; 37.4 mph)
- Range: 1,600 nmi (3,000 km; 1,800 mi) at 12 knots (22 km/h; 14 mph)
- Complement: 105
- Armament: 2 × single 10 cm (3.9 in) guns; 6 × single 66 mm (2.6 in) guns; 2 × twin 45 cm (17.7 in) torpedo tubes

SMS Triglav (Note: "SMS" stands for "Seiner Majestät Schiff", or "His Majesty's Ship".) was one of six Tátra-class destroyers built for the kaiserliche und königliche Kriegsmarine (Austro-Hungarian Navy) shortly before the First World War. Completed in August 1914, the ship participated in an unsuccessful attempt to recapture a small island in the Central Adriatic Sea from the Italians in July 1915. In November and early December Triglav was one of the ships conducting raids off the Albanian coast to interdict the supply lines between Italy and Albania. She was crippled by a mine during the 1st Battle of Durazzo in late December, but was taken in tow. The ship had to be abandoned when the Austro-Hungarian ships were spotted on the return voyage and she was sunk by French destroyers.

== Design and description ==
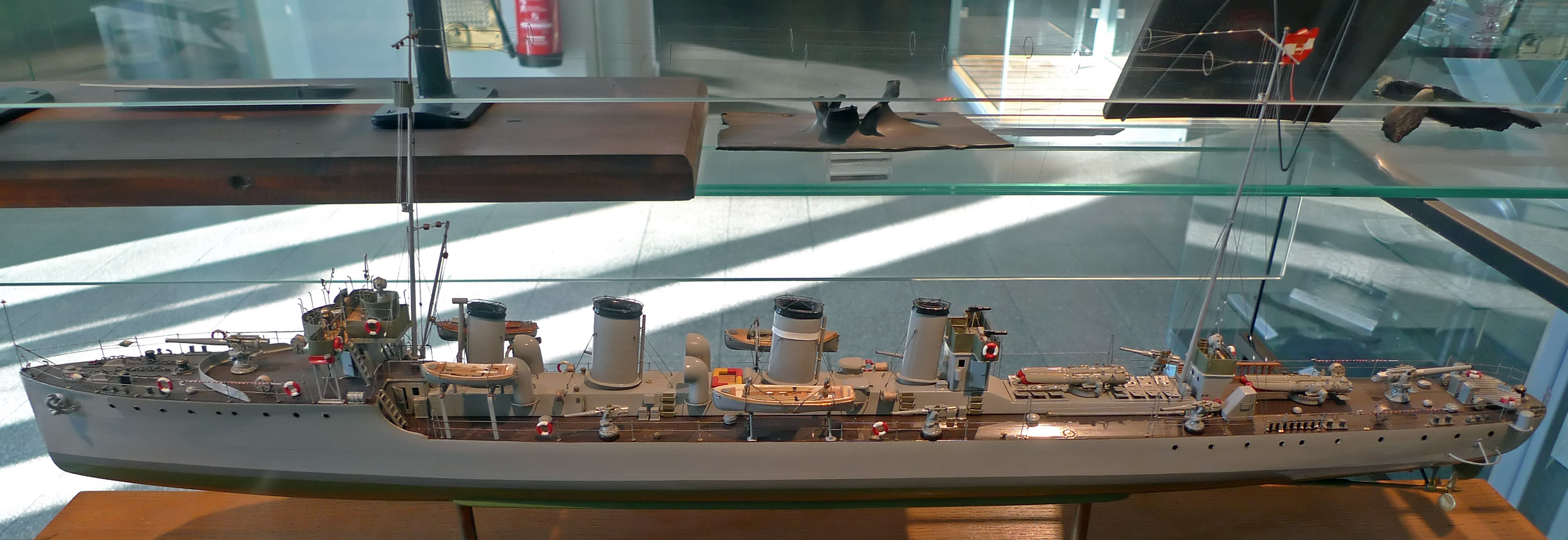
A model of sister ship SMS Tátra in the Heeresgeschichtliches Museum Wien

The Tátra-class destroyers were faster, more powerfully armed and more than twice as large as the preceding Huszár class. The ships had an overall length of 83.5 meters (273 ft 11 in), a beam of 7.8 meters (25 ft 7 in), and a maximum draft of 3 meters (9 ft 10 in). They displaced 870 long tons (880 t) at normal load and 1,050 long tons (1,070 t) at deep load. The ships had a complement of 105 officers and enlisted men.

The Tátras were powered by two AEG-Curtiss steam turbine sets, each driving a single propeller shaft using steam provided by six Yarrow boilers. Four of the boilers were oil-fired while the remaining pair used coal. The turbines, designed to produce 20,600 shaft horsepower (15,400 kW), were intended to give the ships a speed of 32.5 knots (60.2 km/h; 37.4 mph). The ships carried enough oil and coal to give them a range of 1,600 nautical miles (3,000 km; 1,800 mi) at 12 knots (22 km/h; 14 mph).

The main armament of the Tátra-class destroyers consisted of two Škoda Works 10-centimeter (3.9 in) K10 guns, one each fore and aft of the superstructure in single mounts. Their secondary armament consisted of six 66-millimeter (2.6 in) guns, two of which were on anti-aircraft mountings. They were also equipped with four 450-millimeter (17.7 in) torpedo tubes in two twin rotating mountings amidships.

== Construction and career ==
Triglav was laid down by Ganz-Danubius at their shipyard in Porto Ré in the Kingdom of Croatia-Slavonia of the Austro-Hungarian Empire on 1 August 1912, launched on 22 December 1913 and completed on 8 August 1914. The Tátra-class ships did not play a significant role in the minor raids and skirmishing in the Adriatic in 1914 and early 1915 between the Entente Cordiale and the Central Powers. From 9 November to 12 December, Triglav had her propeller shaft bearings replaced.

=== Bombardment of Ancona ===
The Kingdom of Italy signed a secret treaty in London in late April 1915 breaking its alliance with the German Empire and Austro-Hungary and promising to declare war on the Central Powers within a month. Austro-Hungarian intelligence discovered this and Admiral Anton Haus, commander of the Austro-Hungarian Navy, planned a massive surprise attack on Italian ports and facilities on the Northern Adriatic coast, outside of interception range of the modern ships of the Regia Marina stationed at Taranto. During the bombardment, Triglav screened the ships involved.

On 28 July, all six Tátra-class ships and the scout cruisers SMS Saida and SMS Helgoland, reinforced by the German submarine UB-14, attempted to recapture Pelagosa which had been occupied by the Italians on 11 July. Despite a heavy bombardment by the ships, the 108-man landing party was unable to overcome the 90-man garrison and was forced to withdraw.

The Bulgarian declaration of war on Serbia on 14 October cut the existing supply line from Serbia to Salonika, Greece, and forced the Allies to begin supplying Serbia through ports in Albania. This took about a month to work out the details and the Austro-Hungarians took just about as long to decide on a response. Admiral Anton Haus, commander of the Austro-Hungarian Navy, ordered Linienschiffskapitän (Captain) Heinrich Seitz, Helgoland's commander, to take his ship, Saida and all six Tátra-class destroyers on a reconnaissance mission off the Albanian coast on the night of 22/23 November. They encountered and sank a small cargo ship and a motor schooner carrying flour for Serbia; four Italian destroyers were unable to intercept them before they reached friendly territory. Haus was initially reluctant to send his ships so far south, but an order from the Armeeoberkommando (High Command) on 29 November to patrol the Albanian coast and to disrupt Allied troop movements caused him to transfer Helgoland, her sister SMS Novara and the Tátra-class ships to Cattaro. On 6 December, Helgoland and the Tátras swept down the coast to Durazzo, sinking five motor schooners, including two in Durazzo harbor.

=== 1st Battle of Durazzo ===
Austro-Hungarian aircraft spotted a pair of Italian destroyers in Durazzo harbor on 28 December and Haus dispatched Seitz to take Helgoland, Triglav and her sisters SMS Csepel, SMS Lika, SMS Tátra and SMS Balaton south and search the area between Durazzo and Brindisi for them. If they were not found he was to arrive at Durazzo at dawn and destroy any ships found there. Seitz's ships sailed later that day and sank the French submarine Monge at 02:35. He was unable to find the destroyers and dutifully arrived off Durazzo at dawn. At 07:30 he ordered four of his destroyers into the harbor to sink the cargo ship and two schooners anchored there while Helgoland engaged the coastal artillery defending the port. A well-camouflaged 75-millimeter (3 in) artillery battery opened fire at 08:00 at point-blank range. While maneuvering to avoid its fire, Triglav and Lika entered a minefield. After striking two mines in quick succession, Lika sank at 08:03 and Triglav was crippled when her boiler rooms flooded after hitting one mine. (Note: There are no figures available for either the killed or rescued crewmen of Lika in the sources consulted.) After she was maneuvered out of the minefield, Csepel attempted to pass a towline, but it got tangled in one of her propellers, badly damaging it. Tátra was finally successful in securing a tow at 09:30, but was limited to a speed of six knots (11 km/h; 6.9 mph) when Seitz led his ships northwards. He radioed for assistance at 10:35 and was informed an hour later that the armored cruiser SMS Kaiser Karl VI and four torpedo boats were en route to support him.

Italian observers had spotted Seitz's ships at 07:00 and the Allied quick-reaction force of the British light cruiser HMS Dartmouth and the Italian scout cruiser Quarto, escorted by five French destroyers, sortied in an attempt to cut off the Austro-Hungarian ships from their base at Cattaro. These were followed two hours later by the Italian scout cruiser Nino Bixio, the British light cruiser HMS Weymouth and four Italian destroyers. Seitz had ordered Triglav's crew taken off before any of the columns of smoke from these ships were spotted by his ships and he ordered Tátra to drop her tow at 13:15 and abandon Triglav. Five minutes later the Austro-Hungarian ships were spotted and the French destroyers were ordered to deal with Triglav at 13:38 while the cruisers pursued Seitz's ships. The French commander was deceived by smoke coming from Triglav's funnels and opened fire at 5,000 meters (5,500 yd). He was surprised when there was no return fire and decided to sink her with gunfire rather than expending torpedoes. This took over half-an-hour and left his ships well out of position for the pursuit of the other Austro-Hungarian ships.

== Bibliography ==
- Bilzer, Franz F. (1990). Die Torpedoschiffe und Zerstörer der k.u.k. Kriegsmarine 1867–1918. Graz: H. Weishaupt. ISBN 3-9003-1066-1.
- Cernuschi, Enrico & O'Hara, Vincent (2015). "The Naval War in the Adriatic Part 1: 1914–1916". In Jordan, John (ed.). Warship 2015. London: Conway. pp. 161–173. ISBN 978-1-84486-276-4.
- Greger, René (1976). Austro-Hungarian Warships of World War I. London: Ian Allan. ISBN 0-7110-0623-7.
- Halpern, Paul G. (1994). A Naval History of World War I. Annapolis, Maryland: Naval Institute Press. ISBN 1-55750-352-4.
- Noppen, Ryan K. (2016). Austro-Hungarian Cruisers and Destroyers 1914-18. New Vanguard. Vol. 241. Oxford, UK: Osprey Publishing. ISBN 978-1-4728-1470-8.
- O'Hara, Vincent P. & Heinz, Leonard R. (2017). Clash of Fleets: Naval Battles of the Great War, 1914-18. Annapolis, Maryland: Naval Institute Press. ISBN 978-1-68247-008-4.
- Sieche, Erwin (1985). "Austria-Hungary". In Gardiner, Robert & Gray, Randal (eds.). Conway's All the World's Fighting Ships 1906–1921. Annapolis, Maryland: Naval Institute Press. ISBN 0-85177-245-5.
