= Tátra-class destroyer =

1912 class of Austro-Hungarian destroyers

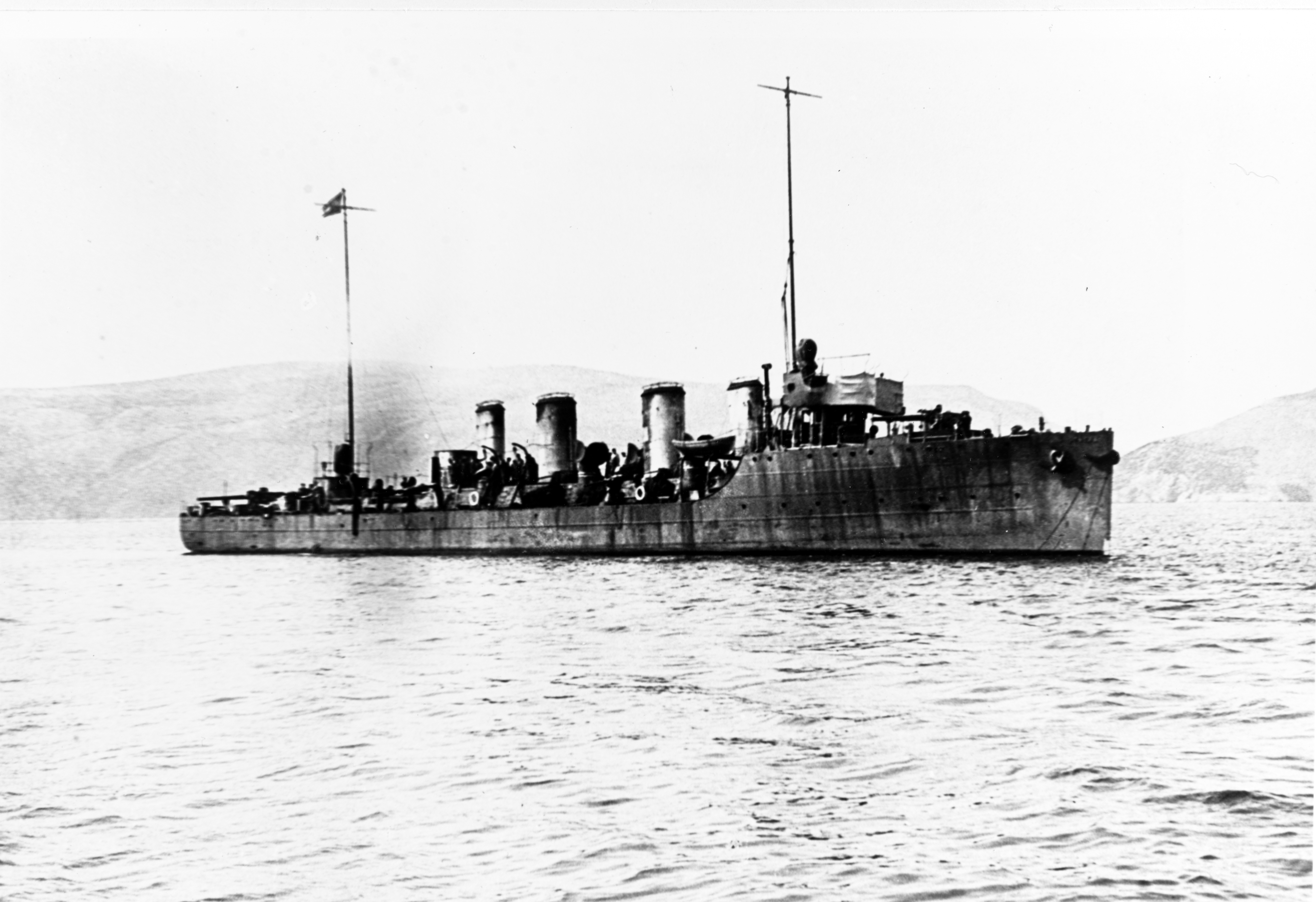
- SMS Tátra in 1913

Class overview
- Name: Tátra class
- Builders: Ganz-Danubius, Porto Ré, Kingdom of Croatia-Slavonia
- Operators: Austro-Hungarian Navy; Regia Marina
- Preceded by: Huszár class
- Succeeded by: Ersatz Triglav class
- Built: 1911–1914
- In service: 1913–1937
- In commission: 1913–1937
- Completed: 6
- Lost: 2
- Scrapped: 4

General characteristics
- Type: Destroyer
- Displacement: 850 t (840 long tons) (normal); 1,050 t (1,030 long tons) (deep load)
- Length: 83.5 m (273 ft 11 in) (o/a)
- Beam: 7.8 m (25 ft 7 in)
- Draft: 3.2 m (10 ft 6 in) (deep load)
- Installed power: 6 × Yarrow boilers; 20,500 shp (15,300 kW)
- Propulsion: 2 × shafts; 2 × steam turbines
- Speed: 32.5 knots (60.2 km/h; 37.4 mph)
- Range: 1,600 nmi (3,000 km; 1,800 mi) at 12 knots (22 km/h; 14 mph)
- Complement: 105
- Armament: 2 × single 10 cm (3.9 in) guns; 6 × single 66 mm (2.6 in) guns; 2 × twin 45 cm (17.7 in) torpedo tubes

The Tátra class consisted of six destroyers built for the Austro-Hungarian Navy shortly before the First World War.

== Design and description ==
By the last years of the first decade of the 20th century, Admiral Graf Rudolf Montecuccoli, head of the Austro-Hungarian Navy (German: kaiserliche und königliche Kriegsmarine), recognized that the latest Huszár-class destroyers were already obsolete in comparison to larger and faster foreign destroyers. His 1910 expansion plan called for six new large destroyers powered by steam turbines and their construction was awarded to a Hungarian shipyard to secure Hungarian parliamentary approval of the expansion program.

The Tátra-class ships displaced more than twice as much as the Huszár class which allowed them to have a much stronger armament and be significantly faster. The ships had an overall length of 83.5 meters (273 ft 11 in), a beam of 7.8 meters (25 ft 7 in), and a maximum draft of 3.2 meters (10 ft 6 in). They displaced 850 metric tons (840 long tons) at normal load and 1,050 metric tons (1,030 long tons) at deep load. The ships had a complement of 105 officers and enlisted men.

The Tátras were powered by two AEG-Curtiss steam turbine sets, each driving a single propeller shaft using steam provided by six Yarrow boilers. Four of the boilers were oil-fired while the remaining pair used coal. The turbines, designed to produce 20,500 shaft horsepower (15,300 kW), were intended to give the ships a speed of 32.5 knots (60.2 km/h; 37.4 mph). Lika was the fastest ship of the class at 32.96 knots (61.04 km/h; 37.93 mph). The ships carried 125 metric tons (123 long tons) of oil and 104 metric tons (102 long tons) of coal which gave them a range of 1,600 nautical miles (3,000 km; 1,800 mi) at 12 knots (22 km/h; 14 mph).

The main armament of the Tátra-class destroyers consisted of two 50-caliber Škoda Works 10-centimeter (3.9 in) K11 guns, one each fore and aft of the superstructure in single mounts. Their secondary armament consisted of six 45-caliber 66-millimeter (2.6 in) K09 TAG (German: Torpedoboot-Abwehr Geschütz (anti-torpedo boat guns)). Two of these were placed on anti-aircraft mountings during the war. They were also equipped with four 450-millimeter (17.7 in) torpedo tubes in two twin rotating mountings aft of the funnels.

== Ships ==
Construction data
Ship	Builder	Laid down	Launched	Completed	Fate
SMS Tátra	Ganz-Danubius, Porto Ré	19 October 1911	14 November 1912	12 October 1913	Transferred to Italy, renamed Fasano, discarded, 1923
SMS Balaton	Ganz-Danubius, Porto Ré	6 November 1911	16 November 1912	3 November 1913	Transferred to Italy, renamed Zenson, discarded, 1923
SMS Csepel	Ganz-Danubius, Porto Ré	59 January 1912	30 December 1912	29 December 1913	Transferred to Italy, renamed Muggia, sunk in a typhoon, 25 March 1929
SMS Lika	Ganz-Danubius, Porto Ré	30 April 1912	15 March 1913	8 August 1914	Sunk by mine during the Battle of Durazzo, 29 December 1915
SMS Triglav	Ganz-Danubius, Porto Ré	1 August 1912	22 December 1913	8 August 1914	Sunk by mine during the Battle of Durazzo, 29 December 1915
SMS Orjen	Ganz-Danubius, Porto Ré	4 September 1912	26 August 1913	11 August 1914	Transferred to Italy, renamed Pola, then Zenson, 1931, discarded, 1937

== Service history ==
Six additional destroyers were authorised on 28 May 1914 to increase the number of modern destroyers in service, but construction was cancelled before they were laid down when World War I began in August.
