= Dual Alliance (1879) =

Alliance between Germany and Austria-Hungary

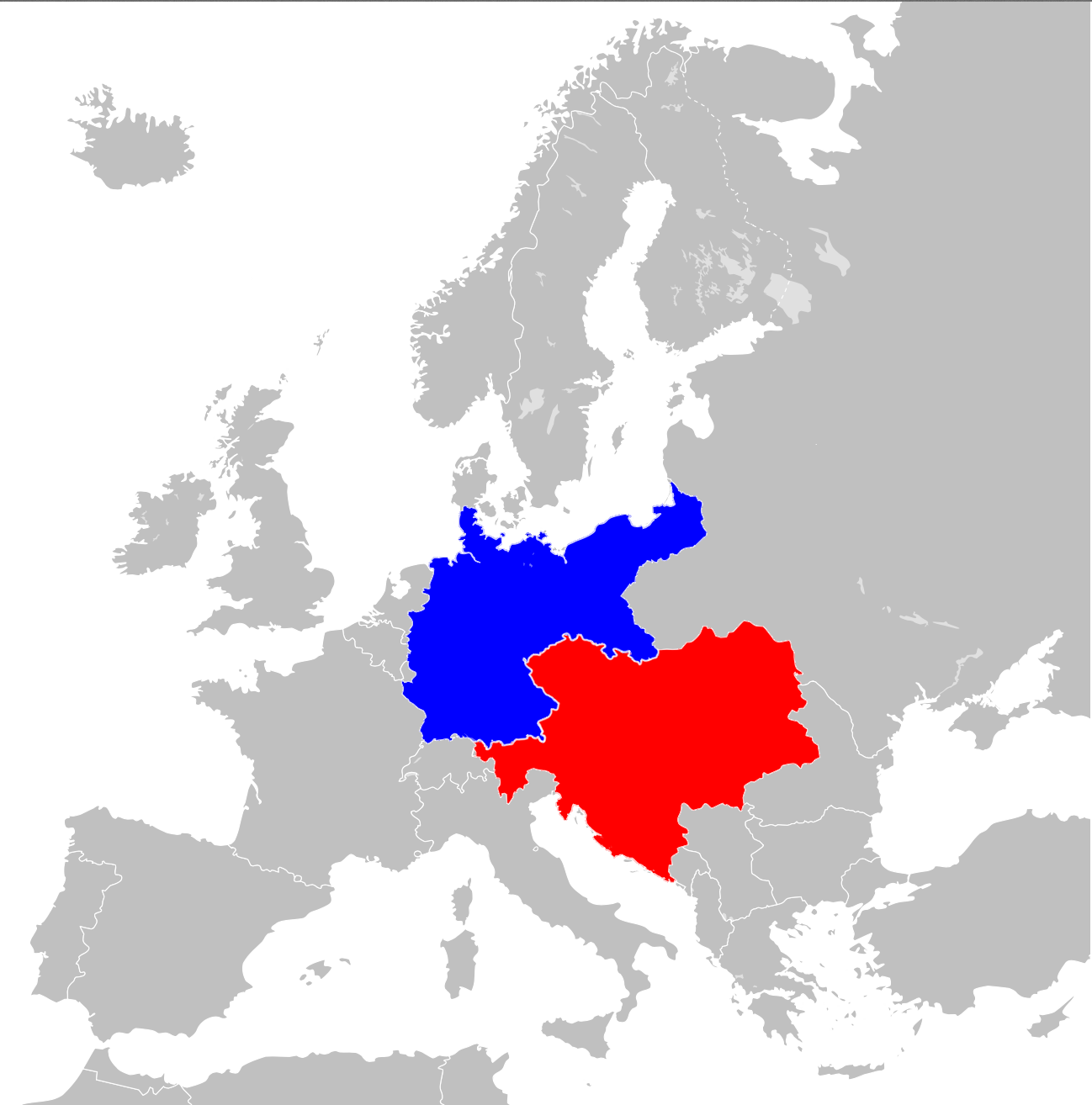
The Dual Alliance in 1914, Germany in blue and Austria-Hungary in red

The Dual Alliance (German: Zweibund, Hungarian: Kettős Szövetség) was a defensive alliance between Germany and Austria-Hungary, which was created by treaty on 7 October 1879, as part of Germany's Otto von Bismarck's system of alliances to prevent or limit war. The two powers promised each other support in case of attack by Russia. Also, each state promised benevolent neutrality to the other if one of them was attacked by another European power (generally taken to be France, even more so after the Franco-Russian Alliance of 1894). Bismarck saw the alliance as a way to prevent the isolation of the German Empire, which had just been founded a few years before, and to preserve peace, as Russia would not wage war against both empires.

== Formation ==
When Austria-Hungary and Germany formed an alliance in 1879, it was one of the more surprising alliances of its time. Though both shared the German language and a similar culture, Austria-Hungary and Germany were often driven apart, most notably during the recent Austro-Prussian War. Additionally, the Habsburg rulers believed that the promotion of nationalism, which was favoured by Germany, would destroy their multinational empire. However, their common distrust of Russia brought both empires together for a common cause.

Alternatively, the Habsburg Empire could explore the strategic advantage of an alliance with newly republican France.

== Alliance against Russia ==
After the formation of the German Empire in 1871, German Chancellor Otto von Bismarck wanted to portray his nation as a peacemaker and preserver of the European status quo, to gain more power for the German Empire and to unify Germany. In 1878, the Russian Empire defeated the Ottoman Empire in the Russo-Turkish War. The resulting Treaty of San Stefano gave Russia considerable influence in the Balkans, a development that outraged Austria-Hungary, Russia's chief rival in the Balkan region (despite being an ally of the Russians and the Germans in the League of the Three Emperors). Hence, in 1878, Bismarck called an international conference (the Congress of Berlin) to sort out the problem. The Treaty of Berlin that resulted from the conference reversed Russia's gains from the Treaty of San Stefano and provided the Austrians with compensation in the form of Bosnia. Russia’s shift from post-Eastern Crisis humiliation to renewed cooperation with Germany and Austria culminated in the revival and reassessment of Russia’s diplomatic priorities; the Convention of Berlin (June 18, 1881) formally recreated the Three Emperors’ League, binding Austria-Hungary, Germany, and Russia to mutual neutrality if any faced war with another Great Power. Despite Bismarck's attempts to play the role of an "honest broker" at the Congress of Berlin, Russo-German relations deteriorated following the conference. The Three Emperors' League was discontinued, and Germany and Austria-Hungary were free to ally against Russia.

Bismarck had hoped to draw Britain in, but overestimated its appetite. When the possibility of an Anglo-German alignment against Russia was raised, Prime Minister Disraeli reportedly told Bismarck, "We will in that case keep France quiet"—to which Bismarck dryly replied, "Is that all?" This exchange captured the gulf: Britain saw no strategic reason to commit to a continental alliance besides countering Russian expansion toward the Mediterranean (it had just acquired Cyprus from the Ottoman Empire in 1878), while Bismarck wanted a broader anti-Russian bloc. The idea of a British and Austro-Hungarian alliance illustrates the complexities of 19th-century diplomacy. The later establishment of Austria-Hungary’s defensive alliance with Germany in October 1879 illustrates the limits imposed by geographic, political, and cultural factors on diplomacy. Britain, wary of entanglement in continental rivalries, was hesitant to commit, highlighting the cautious calculus.

== Italy joins alliance ==
In 1881, Italy lost in the competition with France to establish a colony in Tunis (now Tunisia). To enlist diplomatic support, Italy joined Germany and Austria-Hungary to form the Triple Alliance in 1882.

During World War I, however, Italy did not go to war immediately with its allies but stayed neutral. In 1915, it joined the Entente powers and declared war on Austria-Hungary and, in 1916, against Germany. The Dual Alliance persisted throughout the war as part of the Central Powers and ended with their defeat in 1918.
