= Battle of Durazzo (1915) =

Naval battle of WWI

Coordinates: 41°19′N 19°27′E

- Part of the Adriatic Campaign of World War I
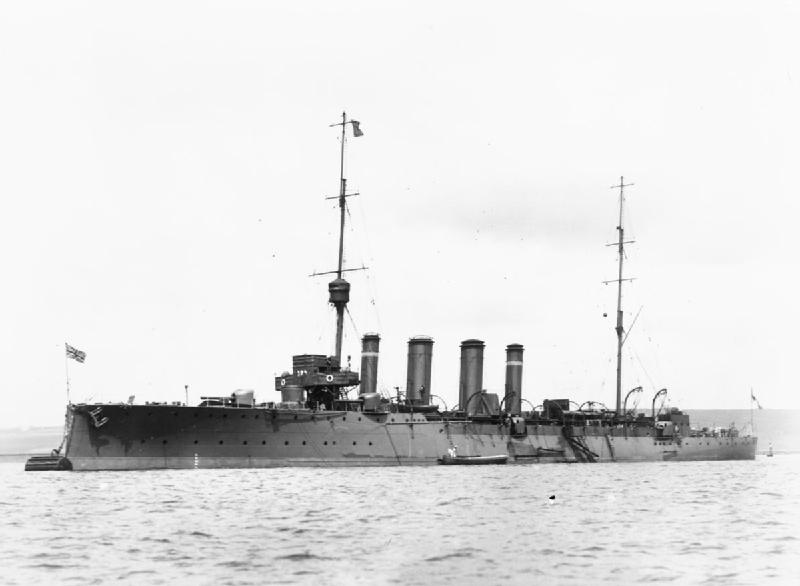
- HMS Dartmouth
Date	28–29 December 1915
Location	Off Durazzo, Adriatic Sea
Result	Allied victory

Belligerents
Kingdom of Italy; United Kingdom; France	Austria-Hungary

Commanders and leaders
Rear Admiral Bellini	Heinrich Seitz

Strength
4 light cruisers 9 destroyers 1 submarine	1 light cruiser 5 destroyers 1 submarine

Casualties and losses
1 submarine sunk 1 light cruiser damaged	2 destroyers sunk 1 light cruiser damaged 1 destroyer damaged

The First Battle of Durazzo was a naval battle of World War I. It was fought off Durazzo (now Durrës), Albania at the end of December 1915 and involved the navies of Austria-Hungary, the United Kingdom, the Kingdom of Italy, and France.

== Battle ==
In December 1915, the Austro-Hungarian Navy sent a cruiser squadron into the Adriatic Sea to interfere with Allied operations related to the Serbian Campaign. The new light cruiser SMS Helgoland — with a main armament of nine 100-millimetre (3.9 in) guns — accompanied by five Tátra-class destroyers left Cattaro and headed for Durazzo (now Durrës) late on 28 December 1915, with the Austro-Hungarian submarine U-15 and two Austro-Hungarian destroyers already off Durazzo on patrol. While on passage, the Austro-Hungarians sighted the French submarine Monge on patrol to the south of Cattaro. The destroyer Balaton opened gunfire on Monge, then rammed and sank her.

Early the next day, the Austro-Hungarian squadron arrived off Durazzo and opened fire on the town, with Helgoland sinking a Greek steamer and two schooners. Then the destroyer Lika ran into a minefield and was sunk and the destroyer Triglav was crippled by another mine. The destroyer Csepel attempted to take Triglav in tow, but fouled a propeller, and the job was taken over by the destroyer Tátra. The Austro-Hungarian force then proceeded slowly northward toward their base at Cattaro.

Allied forces in Brindisi on the coast of Italy were alerted to the Austro-Hungarian force's presence at sea, and the British light cruiser HMS Dartmouth and the Italian protected cruiser Quarto, escorted by five French destroyers, sortied in an attempt to cut off the Austro-Hungarian ships from Cattaro. These were followed two hours later by the Italian protected cruiser Nino Bixio, the British light cruiser HMS Weymouth, and four Italian destroyers. The Austro-Hungarians also responded and despatched from Cattaro the armored cruiser Kaiser Karl VI, the protected cruiser Novara, and scout cruiser Aspern to support the returning survivors of the raid, but they did not see action.

Early in the afternoon of 29 December, the leading Allied ships came into action with the Austro-Hungarian squadron, which was still only halfway home. During the battle the Italian cruiser Quarto hit the Austro-Hungarian cruiser Helgoland five times, Quarto also hit the destroyer Csepel once. The French destroyers headed for the already crippled Triglav and sank her before rejoining the British and Italian cruisers.

Meanwhile, the Allied cruisers attempted to cut off and deal with Helgoland and the three remaining Austro-Hungarian destroyers. In a long-range gunnery duel fought throughout the afternoon, Tatra suffered a damaged engine from several shell hits, but Helgoland skillfully avoided the Allied cruisers and the surviving Austro-Hungarian ships reached Cattaro safely, albeit after having lost the valuable Lika and Triglav.

== See also ==
- Mediterranean naval engagements during World War I
- Otranto Barrage

== Bibliography ==
- Cernuschi, Enrico & O'Hara, Vincent (2015). "The Naval War in the Adriatic Part 1: 1914–1916". In Jordan, John (ed.). Warship 2015. London: Conway. pp. 161–173. ISBN 978-1-84486-276-4.
- Noppen, Ryan K. (2016). Austro-Hungarian Cruisers and Destroyers 1914–18. New Vanguard. Vol. 241. Oxford, UK: Osprey Publishing. ISBN 978-1-4728-1470-8.
- O'Hara, Vincent P. & Heinz, Leonard R. (2017). Clash of Fleets: Naval Battles of the Great War, 1914-18. Annapolis, Maryland: Naval Institute Press. ISBN 978-1-68247-008-4.
