= List of cruisers of World War I =

== List ==
Click on headers to sort columns.

List of cruisers of World War I
Ship	Operator	Class	Type	Displacement (tons)	First commissioned	Fate
Achilles	Royal Navy	Warrior	armored cruiser	13,550	22 April 1907	sold for scrap 9 May 1921
Adamastor	Portuguese Navy		unprotected cruiser	1,729	3 August 1897	decommissioned 16 October 1933, scrapped April 1934
Admiral Makarov	Imperial Russian Navy	Bayan	armored cruiser	7,750	28 April 1908	decommissioned 1918, scrapped 1922
Admiral Spaun	Austro-Hungarian Navy		scout cruiser	3,400	15 November 1910	ceded to Great Britain 1920, scrapped 1920–1921
Agordat	Regia Marina	Agordat	torpedo cruiser	1,340	29 September 1900	sold for scrap 4 January 1923
Albany	United States Navy	New Orleans	protected cruiser	3,769	29 May 1900	decommissioned 1922, sold for scrap 11 February 1930
Almirante Barroso	Brazilian Navy	Almirante Barroso	protected cruiser	3,437	25 August 1896	decommissioned 28 July 1931
Almirante Grau	Peruvian Navy	Almirante Grau	scout cruiser	3,100	10 August 1907	stricken 1958
Almirante Tamandaré	Brazilian Navy		protected cruiser	4,537	27 November 1897	decommissioned 27 December 1915, scrapped 1920
Amalfi	Regia Marina	Pisa	armored cruiser	9,677	1 September 1909	sunk 7 July 1915
Amphitrite	Royal Navy	Diadem	protected cruiser	11,000	17 September 1901	sold for scrap 12 April 1920
Andromeda	Royal Navy	Diadem	protected cruiser	11,000	5 September 1899	scrapped 14 August 1956
Argonaut	Royal Navy	Diadem	protected cruiser	11,000	19 April 1900	scrapped 4 September 1921
Ariadne	Royal Navy	Diadem	protected cruiser	11,000	5 June 1902	sunk 26 July 1917
Askold	Imperial Russian Navy		protected cruiser	5,820	25 January 1902	seized by Great Britain and renamed as HMS Glory IV 1918, scrapped 1922
Aso	Imperial Japanese Navy	Bayan	armored cruiser	7,750	27 January 1903	sunk as target 4 August 1932
Aspern	Austro-Hungarian Navy	Zenta	protected cruiser	2,417	29 May 1900	decommissioned 15 March 1918, ceded to Great Britain and scrapped 1920
Augusto Riboty	Regia Marina	Mirabello	scout cruiser	1,756	5 May 1917	stricken February 1950, scrapped 1951
Aurora	Imperial Russian Navy	Pallada	protected cruiser	6,731	16 July 1903	preserved as museum ship 1956
Bahia	Brazilian Navy	Bahia	scout cruiser	3,050	21 May 1910	sunk by explosion 4 July 1945
Basilicata	Regia Marina	Campania	protected cruiser	2,483	1 August 1917	sunk by boiler explosion 13 August 1919, sold for scrap 1 July 1921
Bayan	Imperial Russian Navy	Bayan	armored cruiser	7,750	14 July 1911	decommissioned 1918, scrapped 1922
Berk-i Satvet	Ottoman Navy	Peyk-i Şevket	torpedo cruiser	775	13 November 1907	stricken 1944, scrapped 1953
Birmingham	United States Navy	Chester	scout cruiser	3,750	11 April 1908	decommissioned 1923, sold for scrap 13 May 1930
Birkenhead	Royal Navy	Town (Birkenhead)	light cruiser	5,235	May 1915	sold for scrap 26 October 1921
Birmingham	Royal Navy	Town (Birmingham)	light cruiser	5,440	3 February 1914	sold for scrap 5 February 1931
Black Prince	Royal Navy	Duke of Edinburgh	armored cruiser	12,590	17 March 1906	sunk 1 June 1916
Blücher	Imperial German Navy		armored cruiser	15,592	1 October 1909	sunk 24 January 1915
Bremse	Imperial German Navy	Brummer	minelayer cruiser	4,316	1 July 1916	scuttled 21 June 1919, raised and scrapped November 1929
Breslau	Imperial German Navy; Ottoman Navy	Magdeburg	light cruiser	4,500	20 August 1912	transferred to Ottoman Empire as Midilli 16 August 1914, sunk 20 January 1918
Brummer	Imperial German Navy	Brummer	minelayer cruiser	4,316	2 April 1916	scuttled 21 June 1919
Brisbane	Royal Australian Navy	Town (Chatham)	light cruiser	5,400	31 October 1916	sold for scrap 13 June 1936
Bristol	Royal Navy	Town (Bristol)	light cruiser	4,800	17 December 1910	sold for scrap 9 May 1921
Buenos Aires	Argentine Navy		protected cruiser	4,788	29 April 1896	stricken 17 May 1932, sold for scrap 1935
Campania	Regia Marina	Campania	protected cruiser	2,483	18 April 1917	stricken 11 March 1937 and sold for scrap
Carlo Alberto Racchia	Regia Marina	Mirabello	scout cruiser	1,756	21 December 1916	sunk 21 July 1920
Carlo Mirabello	Regia Marina	Mirabello	scout cruiser	1,756	24 August 1916	sunk 21 May 1941
Cassard	French Navy	D'Assas	protected cruiser	3,894.6	21 June 1897	stricken 27 July 1924, scrapped 25 November 1925
Cataluña	Spanish Navy	Princesa de Asturias	armored cruiser	6,888	1903	decommissioned 1929, scrapped 1930
Challenger	Royal Navy	Challenger	protected cruiser	5,880	30 May 1904	sold for scrap 1920
Chao Ho	Republic of China Navy	Chao Ho	protected cruiser	2,707	21 February 1912	sunk 28 September 1937
Charleston	United States Navy	St. Louis	protected cruiser	9,700	17 October 1905	decommissioned 1923, sold for scrap 6 March 1930
Châteaurenault	French Navy		protected cruiser	7,898	10 October 1902	sunk 14 December 1917
Chatham	Royal Navy	Town (Chatham)	light cruiser	5,400	December 1912	sold for scrap 13 July 1926
Chattanooga	United States Navy	Denver	protected cruiser	3,200	11 October 1904	decommissioned 1921, sold for scrap 8 March 1930
Chester	United States Navy	Chester	scout cruiser	3,750	25 April 1908	decommissioned 1921, renamed as York 1928, sold for scrap 13 May 1930
Chester	Royal Navy	Town (Birkenhead)	light cruiser	5,185	May 1916	sold for scrap 9 November 1921
Chihaya	Imperial Japanese Navy		unprotected cruiser	1,238	9 September 1901	stricken 1 September 1929, scrapped 1945
Chikuma	Imperial Japanese Navy	Chikuma	protected cruiser	5,040	17 May 1912	stricken 1 April 1931, sunk as target 1935
Claes Uggla	Swedish Navy	Örnen	torpedo cruiser	800	28 November 1900	run aground and sunk 22 June 1917
Clas Fleming	Swedish Navy		minelayer cruiser	1,550	23 February 1914	decommissioned 1 January 1959, scrapped 1960
Cleveland	United States Navy	Denver	protected cruiser	3,200	2 November 1903	decommissioned 1929, sold for scrap 7 March 1930
Coatit	Regia Marina	Agordat	torpedo cruiser	1,292	1 October 1900	sold for scrap 11 June 1920
Cochrane	Royal Navy	Warrior	armored cruiser	13,550	18 February 1907	run aground 14 November 1918, broken up June 1919
Coronel Bolognesi	Peruvian Navy	Almirante Grau	scout cruiser	3,100	10 August 1907	stricken 1958
Cosmao	French Navy	Troude	protected cruiser	1,847.8	8 August 1891	stricken 30 October 1919, scrapped 1928
D'Entrecasteaux	French Navy		protected cruiser	7,898	4 April 1899	to Poland as Bałtyk 1927, scrapped by Germany 1942
Dartmouth	Royal Navy	Town (Weymouth)	light cruiser	5,250	16 October 1911	sold for scrap 13 December 1930
Defence	Royal Navy	Minotaur	armored cruiser	14,600	9 February 1909	sunk 31 May 1916
Denver	United States Navy	Denver	protected cruiser	3,200	17 May 1904	decommissioned 1931, sold for scrap 13 September 1933
Des Moines	United States Navy	Denver	protected cruiser	3,200	5 March 1904	decommissioned 1921, sold for scrap 11 March 1930
Descartes	French Navy	Descartes	protected cruiser	3,942	12 February 1896	stricken 10 May 1920, scrapped 10 May 1921
Diadem	Royal Navy	Diadem	protected cruiser	11,000	19 July 1898	sold for scrap 9 May 1921
Diana	Imperial Russian Navy	Pallada	protected cruiser	6,731	10 December 1901	scrapped 1922
Dresden	Imperial German Navy	Dresden	light cruiser	3,606	14 November 1908	scuttled 14 March 1915
Du Chayla	French Navy	D'Assas	protected cruiser	3,894.6	15 July 1897	stricken 27 October 1921, scrapped December 1933
Dublin	Royal Navy	Town (Chatham)	light cruiser	5,400	March 1913	sold for scrap July 1926
Duke of Edinburgh	Royal Navy	Duke of Edinburgh	armored cruiser	12,590	20 January 1906	sold for scrap 12 April 1920
Dupetit-Thouars	French Navy	Gueydon	armored cruiser	9,032	28 August 1905	sunk 7 August 1918
Edgar Quinet	French Navy	Edgar Quinet	armored cruiser	13,847	15 December 1910	wrecked 4 January 1930
Elbing	Imperial German Navy	Pillau	light cruiser	4,320	4 September 1915	scuttled 1 June 1916
Elisabeta	Royal Romanian Navy		protected cruiser	1,330	5 November 1888	decommissioned 1920, sold for scrap 1926
Elli	Royal Hellenic Navy	Chao Ho	protected cruiser	2,115	14 December 1914	sunk 15 August 1940
Emden	Imperial German Navy	Dresden	light cruiser	3,606	10 July 1909	disabled and grounded 9 November 1914
Emperador Carlos V	Spanish Navy		armored cruiser	9,090	2 June 1898	decommissioned 1922, scrapped 1933
Encounter	Royal Australian Navy	Challenger	protected cruiser	5,880	21 November 1905	scuttled 14 September 1932
Esmeralda	Chilean Navy		armored cruiser	7,032	4 September 1896	decommissioned 1930, sold for scrap 1933
Europa	Royal Navy	Diadem	protected cruiser	11,000	23 November 1899	sold 15 September 1920
Falmouth	Royal Navy	Town (Weymouth)	light cruiser	5,250	September 1911	sunk 20 August 1916
Francesco Ferruccio	Regia Marina	Giuseppe Garibaldi	armored cruiser	7,230	1 September 1905	stricken 1 April 1930 and scrapped
Frankfurt	Imperial German Navy	Wiesbaden	light cruiser	5,100	20 August 1915	ceded to United States as USS Frankfurt 11 March 1920, sunk as target 18 July 1921
Frederick	United States Navy	Pennsylvania	armored cruiser	13,680	18 April 1905	decommissioned 1922, sold for scrap 11 February 1930
Freya	Imperial German Navy	Victoria Louise	protected cruiser	5,570	20 October 1898	stricken 25 January 1920, scrapped 1921
Fylgia	Swedish Navy		armored cruiser	4,300	21 June 1907	decommissioned 1 January 1953, sold for scrap 1957
Galveston	United States Navy	Denver	protected cruiser	3,200	15 February 1905	decommissioned 1930, sold for scrap 13 September 1933
Garibaldi	Argentine Navy	Giuseppe Garibaldi	armored cruiser	6,700	12 October 1896	stricken 20 March 1934, sold for scrap 1936
Gelderland	Royal Netherlands Navy	Holland	protected cruiser	4,033	15 July 1900	captured by Germany 14 May 1940, renamed as Niobe 1 March 1944, sunk 16 July 1944, raised and scrapped June 1953
General Belgrano	Argentine Navy	Giuseppe Garibaldi	armored cruiser	7,120	8 October 1898	stricken 8 May 1947, sold for scrap 1953
Georgios Averof	Royal Hellenic Navy	Pisa	armored cruiser	9,956	16 May 1911	decommissioned 1 August 1952, museum ship
Giuseppe Garibaldi	Regia Marina	Giuseppe Garibaldi	armored cruiser	7,230	1 January 1901	sunk 18 July 1915
Glasgow	Royal Navy	Town (Bristol)	light cruiser	4,800	19 September 1910	sold for scrap 29 April 1927
Gloucester	Royal Navy	Town (Bristol)	light cruiser	4,800	October 1910	sold for scrap 9 May 1921
Gneisenau	Imperial German Navy	Scharnhorst	armored cruiser	11,433	6 March 1908	sunk 8 December 1914
Graudenz	Imperial German Navy	Graudenz	light cruiser	4,834	10 August 1914	ceded to Italy as Ancona 1 June 1920, scrapped 1938
Gueydon	French Navy	Gueydon	armored cruiser	9,397	1 September 1903	decommissioned 1935, sunk 14 August 1944
Hai Chen	Republic of China Navy	Hai Yung	protected cruiser	2,680	21 September 1898	scuttled 25 September 1937, salvaged and scrapped 1964
Hai Chi	Republic of China Navy	Hai Chi	protected cruiser	4,232	10 May 1899	scuttled 11 August 1937
Hai Chou	Republic of China Navy	Hai Yung	protected cruiser	2,680	24 August 1898	scuttled 25 September 1937, salvaged and scrapped 1960
Hai Yung	Republic of China Navy	Hai Yung	protected cruiser	2,680	27 July 1898	scuttled 11 August 1937
Hamidiye	Ottoman Navy		protected cruiser	3,904	15 April 1904	decommissioned March 1947, sold for scrap on 10 September 1964
Hansa	Imperial German Navy	Victoria Louise	protected cruiser	5,792	20 April 1899	stricken 6 December 1919, scrapped 1920
Hertha	Imperial German Navy	Victoria Louise	protected cruiser	5,570	23 July 1898	stricken 6 December 1919, scrapped 1920
Hela	Imperial German Navy		light cruiser	1,995	3 May 1896	sunk 13 September 1914
Helgoland	Austro-Hungarian Navy	Novara	scout cruiser	3,400	5 September 1914	ceded to Italy 1920 and renamed as Brindisi, scrapped 1937
Hirado	Imperial Japanese Navy	Chikuma	protected cruiser	5,040	17 June 1912	stricken 1 April 1940, scrapped 1947
Holland	Royal Netherlands Navy	Holland	protected cruiser	3,900	1 July 1898	decommissioned 1920 and scrapped
Huntington	United States Navy	Pennsylvania	armored cruiser	13,680	23 February 1905	decommissioned 1920, sold for scrap 30 August 1930
Isla de Luzon	United States Navy	Isla de Luzón	protected cruiser	1,022	22 September 1887	stricken 23 July 1919, sold 10 March 1920
Iwate	Imperial Japanese Navy	Izumo	armored cruiser	9,274	18 March 1901	sunk 25 July 1945, scrapped 1946–1947
Izumo	Imperial Japanese Navy	Izumo	armored cruiser	9,353	25 September 1900	sunk 28 July 1945, scrapped 1947
Jeanne d'Arc	French Navy		armored cruiser	11,086	10 March 1903	renamed as Jeanne d'Arc II 1930, sold for scrap 9 July 1934
Jurien de la Gravière	French Navy		protected cruiser	6,070	15 May 1901	sold for scrap 28 December 1922
Kaiser Karl VI	Austro-Hungarian Navy		armored cruiser	6,166	23 May 1900	ceded to Great Britain, scrapped 1920
Kaiserin und Königin Maria Theresia	Austro-Hungarian Navy		armored cruiser	5,330	8 November 1894	ceded to Great Britain, scrapped 1920
Kaiserin Augusta	Imperial German Navy		protected cruiser	5,960	17 November 1892	stricken 1 October 1919, scrapped 1920
Kasuga	Imperial Japanese Navy	Kasuga	armored cruiser	7,578	7 January 1904	sunk 18 July 1945, salvaged and scrapped 1948
Liverpool	Royal Navy	Town (Bristol)	light cruiser	4,800	4 October 1910	sold for scrap 8 November 1921
Lowestoft	Royal Navy	Town (Birmingham)	light cruiser	5,440	21 April 1914	sold for scrap 8 January 1931
Lussin	Austro-Hungarian Navy		torpedo cruiser	995.2	12 July 1884	ceded to Italy 1920 and renamed as Sorrento, scrapped 1928
Magdeburg	Imperial German Navy	Magdeburg	light cruiser	4,500	20 August 1912	ran aground 26 August 1914
Mariscal Sucre	Bolivarian Navy of Venezuela	Isla de Luzón	protected cruiser	1,022	22 September 1887	scrapped 1940
Marsala	Regia Marina	Nino Bixio	protected cruiser	3,575	4 August 1914	scrapped 1927
Mecidiye	Ottoman Navy		protected cruiser	3,485	19 December 1903	decommissioned 1 March 1947, scrapped 1952–1956
Melbourne	Royal Australian Navy	Town (Chatham)	light cruiser	5,400	18 January 1913	scrapped 1929
Memphis	United States Navy	Tennessee	armored cruiser	14,500	17 July 1906	wrecked 29 August 1916, sold for scrap 17 January 1922
Milwaukee	United States Navy	St. Louis	protected cruiser	9,700	11 May 1906	run aground 13 January 1917, sold for scrap 5 August 1919
Minotaur	Royal Navy	Minotaur	armored cruiser	14,600	1 April 1908	paid off 5 February 1919, sold for scrap April 1920
Mogami	Imperial Japanese Navy	Yodo	protected cruiser	1,350	16 September 1908	stricken 1 April 1928, scrapped 31 January 1929
Montana	United States Navy	Tennessee	armored cruiser	14,500	21 July 1908	renamed USS Missoula 7 June 1920, sold for scrap 29 September 1930
Montcalm	French Navy	Gueydon	armored cruiser	9,032	20 March 1902	decommissioned 28 October 1926, sunk 16 August 1944
Montevideo	National Navy of Uruguay		protected cruiser	2,050	28 April 1887	scrapped 1932
Natal	Royal Navy	Warrior	armored cruiser	13,550	5 March 1907	sunk by magazine explosion 30 December 1915
New Orleans	United States Navy	New Orleans	protected cruiser	3,769	18 March 1898	decommissioned 1922, sold for scrap 11 February 1930
Newcastle	Royal Navy	Town (Bristol)	light cruiser	4,800	20 September 1910	sold for scrap 9 May 1921
Nino Bixio	Regia Marina	Nino Bixio	protected cruiser	3,575	5 May 1914	scrapped 1929
Niobe	Royal Canadian Navy	Diadem	protected cruiser	11,000	6 December 1898	paid off 1920, broken up 1922
Nisshin	Imperial Japanese Navy	Kasuga	armored cruiser	7,578	7 January 1904	sunk as target 18 January 1942
Noordbrabant	Royal Netherlands Navy	Holland	protected cruiser	4,033	1 March 1900	decommissioned 1920, scuttled 17 May 1940
North Carolina	United States Navy	Tennessee	armored cruiser	14,500	7 May 1908	renamed USS Charlotte 7 June 1920, sold for scrap 29 September 1930
Nottingham	Royal Navy	Town (Birmingham)	light cruiser	5,440	1 April 1914	sunk 19 August 1916
Novara	Austro-Hungarian Navy	Novara	scout cruiser	3,400	10 January 1915	ceded to France 1920 and renamed as Thionville, scrapped 1941
Nueve de Julio	Argentine Navy		protected cruiser	3,600	29 June 1893	decommissioned 23 October 1930 and scrapped
O'Higgins	Chilean Navy		armored cruiser	7,796	2 April 1898	scrapped 1958
Otowa	Imperial Japanese Navy		protected cruiser	3,000	6 September 1904	ran aground 1 August 1917, sunk 10 August 1917
Patagonia	Argentine Navy		armored cruiser	1,530	19 November 1886	decommissioned 17 September 1927, sold for scrap 1973
Pallada	Imperial Russian Navy	Bayan	armored cruiser	7,750	8 February 1911	sunk 11 October 1914
Peresvet	Imperial Russian Navy	Peresvet	armored cruiser	13,810	6 August 1901	sunk 4 January 1917
Peyk-i Şevket	Ottoman Navy	Peyk-i Şevket	torpedo cruiser	775	13 November 1907	stricken 1944, scrapped 1953
Pillau	Imperial German Navy	Pillau	light cruiser	4,320	14 December 1914	ceded to Italy 1920, recommissioned as Bari 21 January 1924, sunk 28 June 1943, raised 13 January 1948 and scrapped
Pisa	Regia Marina	Pisa	armored cruiser	9,677	1 September 1909	stricken 28 April 1937 and scrapped
Pittsburgh	United States Navy	Pennsylvania	armored cruiser	13,680	9 March 1905	sold for scrap 21 December 1931
Pothuau	French Navy		armored cruiser	5,374	5 June 1897	sold for scrap 25 September 1929
Princesa de Asturias	Spanish Navy	Princesa de Asturias	armored cruiser	6,888	10 June 1903	decommissioned 28 December 1927, scrapped 1933
Psilander	Swedish Navy	Örnen	torpedo cruiser	800	20 July 1900	sunk as target 3 August 1939
Pueblo	United States Navy	Pennsylvania	armored cruiser	13,680	19 January 1905	decommissioned 1927, sold for scrap 2 October 1930
Pueyrredón	Argentine Navy	Giuseppe Garibaldi	armored cruiser	6,700	4 August 1898	stricken 2 August 1954, sold for scrap 1957
Quarto	Regia Marina		protected cruiser	3,271	31 March 1913	sunk as target November 1940
Regensburg	Imperial German Navy	Graudenz	light cruiser	4,834	3 January 1915	ceded to France as Strasbourg 4 June 1920, stricken June 1936, scuttled 1944
Reina Regente	Spanish Navy		protected cruiser	5,203	8 October 1910	decommissioned 1926, scrapped 1929
Rio Grande do Sul	Brazilian Navy	Bahia	scout cruiser	3,050	14 May 1910	scrapped 1948
Roon	Imperial German Navy	Roon	armored cruiser	9,382	5 April 1906	stricken 25 November 1920, scrapped 1921
Rossia	Imperial Russian Navy		armored cruiser	12,195	13 September 1897	sold for scrap 1 July 1922
Saida	Austro-Hungarian Navy	Novara	scout cruiser	3,400	1 August 1914	ceded to Italy 1920 and renamed as Venezia, scrapped 1937
Salem	United States Navy	Chester	scout cruiser	3,750	1 August 1908	decommissioned 1921, sold for scrap 11 February 1930
San Diego	United States Navy	Pennsylvania	armored cruiser	13,680	1 August 1907	sunk 19 July 1918
San Giorgio	Regia Marina	San Giorgio	armored cruiser	10,796	1 July 1910	scuttled 22 January 1941, sank while under tow 1952
San Marco	Regia Marina	San Giorgio	armored cruiser	10,796	7 February 1911	scrapped 1949
San Martín	Argentine Navy	Giuseppe Garibaldi	armored cruiser	6,700	25 April 1898	stricken 8 December 1935, sold for scrap 1947
Sankt Georg	Austro-Hungarian Navy		armored cruiser	7,289	21 July 1905	ceded to Great Britain, scrapped 1920
Scharnhorst	Imperial German Navy	Scharnhorst	armored cruiser	11,433	24 October 1907	sunk 8 December 1914
Seattle	United States Navy	Tennessee	armored cruiser	14,500	7 August 1906	decommissioned 1946, sold for scrap 1946
Sebenico	Austro-Hungarian Navy	Zara	torpedo cruiser	882.6	December 1882	ceded to Italy and scrapped 1920
South Dakota	United States Navy	Pennsylvania	armored cruiser	13,680	27 January 1908	renamed USS Huron 7 June 1920, decommissioned 1927, hulked August 1931, sunk 18 February 1961
Shannon	Royal Navy	Minotaur	armored cruiser	14,600	19 March 1908	paid off 2 May 1919, sold for scrap 12 December 1922
Southampton	Royal Navy	Town (Chatham)	light cruiser	5,400	November 1912	sold for scrap 13 July 1926
Spartiate	Royal Navy	Diadem	protected cruiser	11,000	17 March 1903	renamed HMS Fisgard June 1915, sold for scrap July 1932
Spalato	Austro-Hungarian Navy	Zara	torpedo cruiser	833	September 1881	ceded to Italy 1920, scrapped 1921
St. Louis	United States Navy	St. Louis	protected cruiser	9,700	18 August 1906	decommissioned 1922, sold for scrap 13 August 1930
Stralsund	Imperial German Navy	Magdeburg	light cruiser	4,500	10 December 1912	ceded to France as Mulhouse 3 August 1920, scrapped 1935
Strassburg	Imperial German Navy	Magdeburg	light cruiser	4,500	9 October 1912	ceded to Italy as Taranto 20 July 1920, sunk 23 September 1944
Surcouf	French Navy	Forbin	protected cruiser	2,015	10 October 1890	stricken 4 April 1921, sold for scrap 10 May 1921
Sydney	Royal Australian Navy	Town (Chatham)	light cruiser	5,400	26 June 1913	scrapped 1929
Szigetvár	Austro-Hungarian Navy	Zenta	protected cruiser	2,313	30 September 1901	decommissioned 15 March 1918, ceded to Great Britain and scrapped 1920
Tacoma	United States Navy	Denver	protected cruiser	3,200	30 January 1904	run aground 16 January 1924, sold for scrap 5 September 1924
Takachiho	Imperial Japanese Navy	Naniwa	protected cruiser	3,727	26 March 1886	sunk 18 October 1914
Tamoio	Brazilian Navy	Tupi	torpedo cruiser	1,170	November 1896	decommissioned 1916
Tiradentes	Brazilian Navy		torpedo cruiser	795	13 September 1893	decommissioned 5 July 1925
Tone	Imperial Japanese Navy		protected cruiser	4,113	5 May 1910	sunk as target 30 April 1933
Tsugaru	Imperial Japanese Navy	Pallada	protected cruiser	6,731	2 November 1901	scuttled 27 May 1924
Tupi	Brazilian Navy	Tupi	torpedo cruiser	1,170	14 October 1897	decommissioned 27 December 1915
Tymbira	Brazilian Navy	Tupi	torpedo cruiser	1,170	26 January 1896	decommissioned 30 November 1917
Varese	Regia Marina	Giuseppe Garibaldi	armored cruiser	7,230	5 April 1901	stricken 4 January 1923 and scrapped
Varyag	Imperial Russian Navy		protected cruiser	6,500	2 January 1901	seized by Great Britain February 1918, scrapped 1923–1925
Veinticinco de Mayo	Argentine Navy		protected cruiser	3,500	3 September 1891	scrapped 1927
Victoria Louise	Imperial German Navy	Victoria Louise	protected cruiser	5,570	20 February 1899	stricken 4 July 1919, scrapped 1923
Vineta	Imperial German Navy	Victoria Louise	protected cruiser	5,792	13 September 1899	stricken 6 December 1919, scrapped 1920
Waldeck-Rousseau	French Navy	Edgar Quinet	armored cruiser	13,995	8 August 1911	hulked 14 June 1936, scrapped 1941–1943
Warrior	Royal Navy	Warrior	armored cruiser	13,550	12 December 1906	sunk 1 June 1916
Weymouth	Royal Navy	Town (Weymouth)	light cruiser	5,250	October 1911	sold for scrap 2 October 1928
Wiesbaden	Imperial German Navy	Wiesbaden	light cruiser	5,100	23 August 1915	sunk 1 June 1916
Yahagi	Imperial Japanese Navy	Chikuma	protected cruiser	5,040	27 July 1912	stricken 1 April 1940, scrapped 1947
Yarmouth	Royal Navy	Town (Weymouth)	light cruiser	5,250	April 1912	sold for scrap 2 July 1929
Ying Rui	Republic of China Navy	Chao Ho	protected cruiser	2,460	2 December 1911	sunk 25 October 1937
Yodo	Imperial Japanese Navy	Yodo	protected cruiser	1,270	8 April 1908	stricken 1 April 1940, scrapped 1945
Yorck	Imperial German Navy	Roon	armored cruiser	9,382	21 November 1905	sunk 4 November 1914
Zara	Austro-Hungarian Navy	Zara	torpedo cruiser	833	17 July 1882	ceded to Italy 1920, scrapped 1921
Zenta	Austro-Hungarian Navy	Zenta	protected cruiser	2,313	28 May 1899	sunk 16 August 1914
Zhemchug	Imperial Russian Navy	Izumrud	protected cruiser	3,103	26 July 1904	sunk 28 October 1914, partially raised and scrapped 1920s
Zeeland	Royal Netherlands Navy	Holland	protected cruiser	3,900	1 June 1898	decommissioned 1924 and scrapped

== See also ==
- List of cruisers
- List of cruisers of World War II
