= Italian cruiser Marsala =

Protected cruiser of the Italian Royal Navy

- Illustration of Marsala

History

Italy
- Builder: Regio Cantiere di Castellammare di Stabia
- Laid down: 15 February 1911
- Launched: 24 March 1912
- Commissioned: 4 August 1914
- Stricken: 27 November 1927
- Fate: Scrapped, 1927

General characteristics
- Class & type: Nino Bixio-class cruiser
- Displacement: Normal: 3,575 long tons (3,632 t); Full load: 4,141 long tons (4,207 t)
- Length: 140.3 m (460 ft 4 in)
- Beam: 13 m (42 ft 8 in)
- Draft: 4.1 m (13 ft 5 in)
- Installed power: 14 × Blechynden boilers; 23,000 shp (17,000 kW)
- Propulsion: 3 × steam turbines; 3 × screw propellers
- Speed: 27.66 knots (51.23 km/h; 31.83 mph)
- Range: 1,400 nmi (2,600 km; 1,600 mi) at 13 kn (24 km/h; 15 mph)
- Complement: 13 officers; 283 enlisted men
- Armament: 6 × 120 mm (4.7 in) guns; 6 × 76 mm (3 in) guns; 2 × 450 mm (17.7 in) torpedo tubes; 200 naval mines
- Armor: Deck: 38 mm (1.5 in); Conning tower: 100 mm (3.9 in)

Marsala was a protected cruiser built by the Italian Regia Marina (Royal Navy) in the 1910s. She was the second and final member of the Nino Bixio class, which were built as scouts for the main Italian fleet. She was equipped with a main battery of six 120-millimeter (4.7 in) guns and had a top speed in excess of 26 knots (48 km/h; 30 mph), but her engines proved to be troublesome in service. Marsala spent World War I based at Brindisi; she was involved in the Battle of the Otranto Straits in May 1917, where she briefly engaged Austro-Hungarian cruisers. Marsala's career was cut short in November 1927 when she was stricken from the naval register and sold for scrap, the result of her unreliable engines and drastic cuts to the naval budget.

== Design ==
Plan and profile drawing of Marsala

The Nino Bixio-class cruisers were ordered in response to the development of fast light cruisers by the Austro-Hungarian Navy in the early 1900s. They were intended to supplement the protected cruiser Quarto to serve as scouts for the main battle fleet. Two ships, Marsala and Nino Bixio, were ordered during the tenure of Admiral Carlo Mirabello as the Minister of the Navy.

Marsala was 140.3 meters (460 ft 4 in) long at the waterline, with a beam of 13 m (42 ft 8 in) and a draft of 4.1 m (13 ft 5 in). She displaced 3,575 long tons (3,632 t) normally and up to 4,141 long tons (4,207 t) at full load. She had a short forecastle deck and a pair of pole masts. Her crew consisted of 13 officers and 283 enlisted men.

The ship's propulsion system consisted of three steam turbines, each driving a screw propeller. Steam was provided by fourteen mixed coal and oil firing Blechynden boilers, which were vented into four widely spaced funnels. The engines were rated at 23,000 shaft horsepower (17,000 kW) for a top speed of 27.66 knots (51.23 km/h; 31.83 mph). She had a cruising range of 1,400 nautical miles (2,600 km; 1,600 mi) at an economical speed of 13 knots (24 km/h; 15 mph). The ship's propulsion system proved to be unreliable in service.

Marsala was armed with a main battery of six 120 mm (4.7 in) L/50 guns mounted singly. (Note: L/50 refers to the length of the gun in terms of caliber.) She was also equipped with a secondary battery of six 76 mm (3 in) L/50 guns, which provided close-range defense against torpedo boats. She also carried two 450 mm (17.7 in) torpedo tubes submerged in the hull. Marsala also had a capacity to carry 200 naval mines. The ship was only lightly armored, with a 38 mm (1.5 in) thick deck, and 100 mm (3.9 in) thick plating on her main conning tower.

== Service history ==
Marsala's keel was laid down at the Regio Cantiere di Castellammare di Stabia shipyard on 15 February 1911, the same day as Nino Bixio. Work on Marsala proceeded slower than on her sister, and she was launched on 24 March 1912, where she was named for the city where Giuseppe Garibaldi launched the Expedition of the Thousand in 1860. After completing fitting-out work, the ship was commissioned into the Italian fleet on 4 August 1914. Marsala was thereafter assigned to the 1st Division of the 2nd Squadron; the squadron consisted of two divisions of armored cruisers, each supported by a scout cruiser.

=== World War I ===
Italy, a member of the Central Powers, declared neutrality at the start of World War I in August 1914, but by May 1915, the Triple Entente had convinced the Italians to enter the war against their former allies. Admiral Paolo Thaon di Revel, the Italian naval chief of staff, believed that Austro-Hungarian submarines could operate too effectively in the narrow waters of the Adriatic, which could also be easily seeded with minefields. The threat from these underwater weapons was too serious for him to use the fleet in an active way. Instead, Revel decided to implement a blockade at the relatively safer southern end of the Adriatic with the main fleet, while smaller vessels, such as the MAS boats, conducted raids on Austro-Hungarian ships and installations.

At the time Italy entered the war, Marsala was out of service to be converted to oil-fired boilers. After returning to service in February 1916, she was based at Brindisi in southern Italy to support the Otranto Barrage, along with the protected cruisers Puglia, Libia, Quarto, and Nino Bixio, and several destroyers and submarines. The British contributed four cruisers of the British Adriatic Squadron: the light cruisers HMS Weymouth and Bristol and the protected cruisers Topaze and Sapphire. Two French armored cruisers and twelve destroyers rounded out the light forces available to patrol the area.

By May 1917, the reconnaissance forces at Brindisi had come under the command of Rear Admiral Alfredo Acton. On the night of 14–15 May, the Austro-Hungarian cruisers Helgoland, Novara, and Saida and several destroyers raided the Otranto Barrage, a patrol line of drifters intended to block Austro-Hungarian and German U-boats. Marsala was the only Italian cruiser with steam up in her boilers when word of the Austro-Hungarian attack reached Brindisi. The British cruisers HMS Dartmouth and Bristol departed first, along with five Italian destroyers. Marsala, the flotilla leader Racchia, and three destroyers followed thereafter, leaving Brindisi at around 8:30. They initially steamed east toward Valona before turning north to join Acton's forces pursuing the Austro-Hungarians. Marsala briefly engaged the fleeing Austro-Hungarians in the Battle of the Otranto Straits, before Acton temporarily broke off the pursuit. By around 11:00, Acton had seen Austro-Hungarian reinforcements steaming south, leading him to turn south with the two British cruisers to join Marsala's group. Having united his forces by around 11:30, Acton turned north once again to try to catch the damaged Novara, but half an hour later, the powerful armored cruiser SMS Sankt Georg had reached the scene. Unable to engage the heavily armed vessel, Acton broke off again and returned to port.

=== Postwar career ===
Following the end of the war in November 1918, the Regia Marina demobilized; severely reduced naval budgets—the result of a weakened Italian economy in the early 1920s—led to further draw-downs. Marsala's engines were plagued with problems throughout her career, which made the ship an obvious target in the effort to trim the Regia Marina's budget. She was stricken from the naval register on 27 November 1927 and subsequently broken up for scrap.
