= Italian cruiser Nino Bixio =

Protected cruiser of the Italian Royal Navy

- Illustration of Nino Bixio's sister ship Marsala

History

Italy
- Builder: Regio Cantiere di Castellammare di Stabia
- Laid down: 15 February 1911
- Launched: 30 December 1911
- Commissioned: 5 May 1914
- Stricken: 15 March 1929
- Fate: Scrapped, 1929

General characteristics
- Class & type: Nino Bixio-class cruiser
- Displacement: Normal: 3,575 long tons (3,632 t); Full load: 4,141 long tons (4,207 t)
- Length: 140.3 m (460 ft 4 in)
- Beam: 13 m (42 ft 8 in)
- Draft: 4.1 m (13 ft 5 in)
- Installed power: 14 × Blechynden boilers; 23,000 shp (17,000 kW)
- Propulsion: 3 × steam turbines; 3 × screw propellers
- Speed: 26.82 knots (49.67 km/h; 30.86 mph)
- Range: 1,400 nmi (2,600 km; 1,600 mi) at 13 kn (24 km/h; 15 mph)
- Complement: 13 officers; 283 enlisted men
- Armament: 6 × 120 mm (4.7 in) guns; 6 × 76 mm (3 in) guns; 2 × 450 mm (17.7 in) torpedo tubes; 200 naval mines
- Armor: Deck: 38 mm (1.5 in); Conning tower: 100 mm (3.9 in)

Nino Bixio was a protected cruiser built by the Italian Regia Marina (Royal Navy) in the early 1910s. She was the lead ship of the Nino Bixio class, which were built as scouts for the main Italian fleet. She was equipped with a main battery of six 120-millimeter (4.7 in) guns and had a top speed in excess of 26 knots (48 km/h; 30 mph), but her engines proved to be troublesome in service. Nino Bixio saw service during World War I and briefly engaged the Austro-Hungarian cruiser SMS Helgoland in 1915. Her career was cut short in the post-war period due to severe cuts to the Italian naval budget, coupled with her unreliable engines. Nino Bixio was stricken from the naval register in March 1929 and sold for scrap.

== Design ==
Plan and profile drawing of Nino Bixio

The Nino Bixio-class cruisers were ordered in response to the development of fast light cruisers by the Austro-Hungarian Navy in the early 1900s. They were intended to supplement the protected cruiser Quarto to serve as scouts for the main battle fleet. Two ships, Nino Bixio and Marsala, were ordered during the tenure of Admiral Carlo Mirabello as the Minister of the Navy.

Nino Bixio was 140.3 meters (460 ft 4 in) long at the waterline, with a beam of 13 m (42 ft 8 in) and a draft of 4.1 m (13 ft 5 in). She displaced 3,575 long tons (3,632 t) normally and up to 4,141 long tons (4,207 t) at full load. She had a short forecastle deck and a pair of pole masts. Her crew consisted of 13 officers and 283 enlisted men.

The ship's propulsion system consisted of three Curtiss steam turbines, each driving a screw propeller. Steam was provided by fourteen mixed coal and oil firing Blechynden boilers, which were vented into four widely spaced funnels. The engines were rated at 23,000 shaft horsepower (17,000 kW) for a top speed of 26.82 knots (49.67 km/h; 30.86 mph). She had a cruising range of 1,400 nautical miles (2,600 km; 1,600 mi) at an economical speed of 13 knots (24 km/h; 15 mph). The ship's propulsion system proved to be unreliable in service.

The ship was armed with a main battery of six 120 mm (4.7 in) L/50 guns mounted singly. (Note: L/50 refers to the length of the gun in terms of caliber.) She was also equipped with a secondary battery of six 76 mm (3 in) L/50 guns, which provided close-range defense against torpedo boats. She also carried two 450 mm (17.7 in) torpedo tubes submerged in the hull. Nino Bixio also had a capacity to carry 200 naval mines. The ship was only lightly armored, with a 38 mm (1.5 in) thick deck, and 100 mm (3.9 in) thick plating on her main conning tower.

== Service history ==
Nino Bixio, named for the soldier and politician, was built at the Regio Cantiere di Castellammare di Stabia shipyard; her keel was laid down on 15 February 1911, the same day as her sister Marsala. Nino Bixio's completed hull was launched ten months later on 30 December, after which fitting-out work commenced. The ship was completed by 5 May 1914, when she was commissioned into the Italian fleet. Nino Bixio was thereafter assigned to the 2nd Division of the 1st Squadron; the squadron consisted of two divisions of battleships, each supported by a scout cruiser. The 2nd Division included the four Regina Elena-class battleships, for which Nino Bixio served as the scout.

=== World War I ===
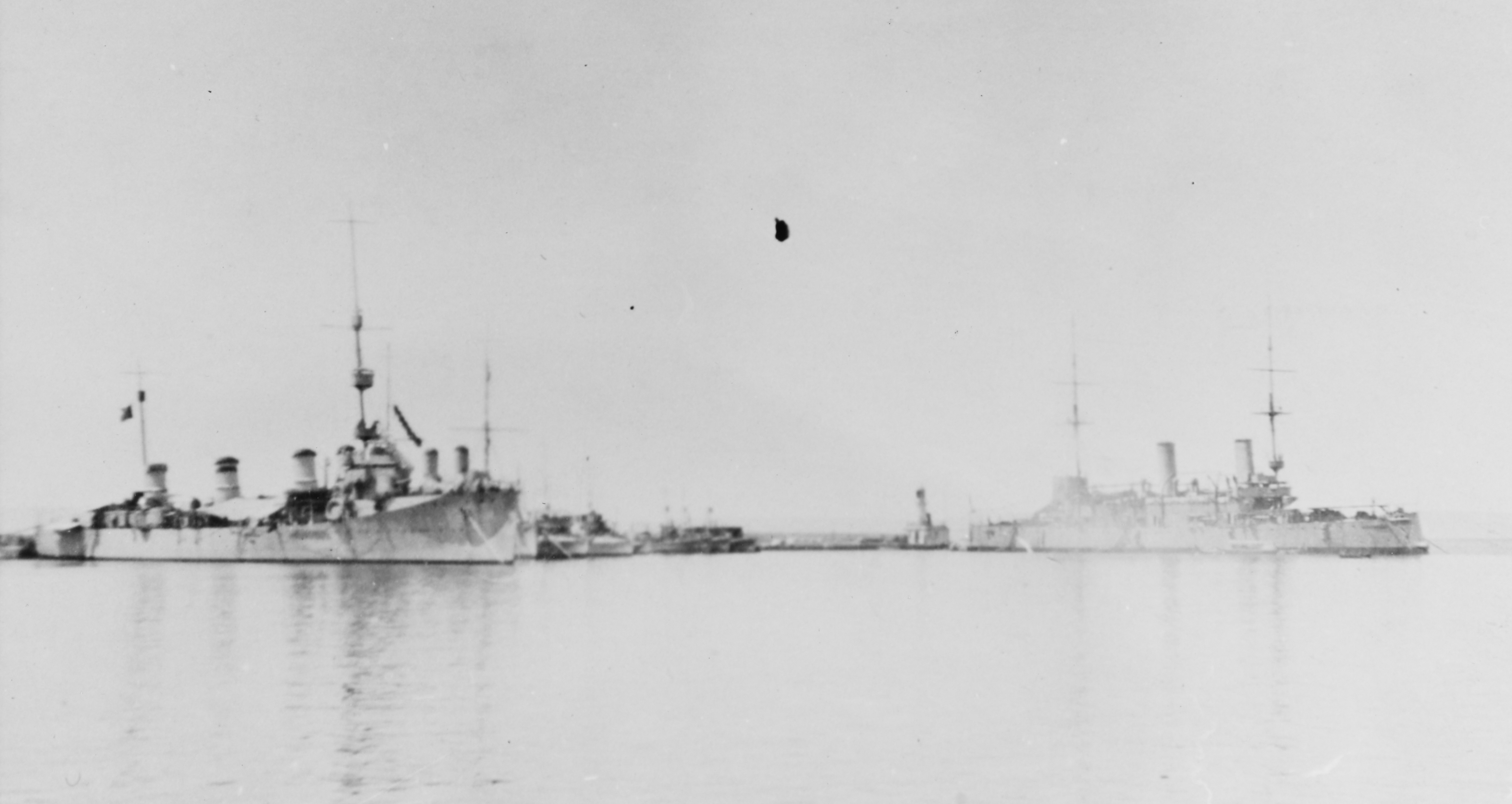
Nino Bixio (left) and other warships in Split in 1919

Italy, a member of the Central Powers, declared neutrality at the start of World War I in August 1914, but by May 1915, the Triple Entente had convinced the Italians to enter the war against their former allies. Admiral Paolo Thaon di Revel, the Italian naval chief of staff, believed that Austro-Hungarian submarines could operate too effectively in the narrow waters of the Adriatic, which could also be easily seeded with minefields. The threat from these underwater weapons was too serious for him to use the fleet in an active way. Instead, Revel decided to implement blockade at the relatively safer southern end of the Adriatic with the main fleet, while smaller vessels, such as the MAS boats, conducted raids on Austro-Hungarian ships and installations.

Nino Bixio was based at Brindisi in southern Italy to support the Otranto Barrage, along with the protected cruisers Puglia, Quarto, and Libia, and several destroyers and submarines. The British contributed four cruisers of the British Adriatic Squadron: the light cruisers HMS Weymouth and Bristol and the protected cruisers Topaze and Sapphire. Two French armored cruisers and twelve destroyers rounded out the light forces available to patrol the area.

On 29 December 1915, an Austro-Hungarian force of two cruisers and five destroyers attempted to intercept transports supplying the Serbian Army trapped in Albania. Quarto departed first, along with the British cruiser HMS Dartmouth and five French destroyers; Nino Bixio followed two hours later with Weymouth and four Italian destroyers. The first flotilla engaged in a running battle with the fleeing Austro-Hungarian cruiser SMS Helgoland but Nino Bixio's group was too far behind to close to effective range. It was hoped that the Quarto and Dartmouth group, which was further to the north, would be able to drive the Austro-Hungarian flotilla toward Nino Bixio and Weymouth, but the faster Austro-Hungarian ships were able to escape the trap. She and Weymouth briefly engaged the fleeing Austro-Hungarians at very long range, and Nino Bixio received a single hit forward. Poor coordination between the Italian, British, and French ships led to their failure to decisively engage the Austro-Hungarians, but the latter nevertheless lost two of their six best destroyers.

By May 1917, the reconnaissance forces at Brindisi had come under the command of Rear Admiral Alfredo Acton. On the night of 14–15 May, the Austro-Hungarian cruisers Helgoland, Novara, and Saida raided the Otranto Barrage—a patrol line of drifters intended to block Austro-Hungarian and German U-boats. She did not participate in the ensuing Battle of the Otranto Straits because she did not have steam up in her boilers when the Italo-British forces counterattacked.

=== Postwar career ===
The Regia Marina demobilized after the end of the war in 1918 and the draw-down continued into the 1920s in large part due to severe budgetary shortfalls in the postwar period. The engines installed on Nino Bixio and her sister proved to be problematic throughout her time in service, which ultimately cut her career short. She was stricken from the naval register on 15 March 1929 and subsequently broken up for scrap; in contrast, the much more efficient Quarto, which had been built before Nino Bixio, remained in service for another decade.
