= Italian cruiser Libia =

Protected cruiser of the Italian Royal Navy

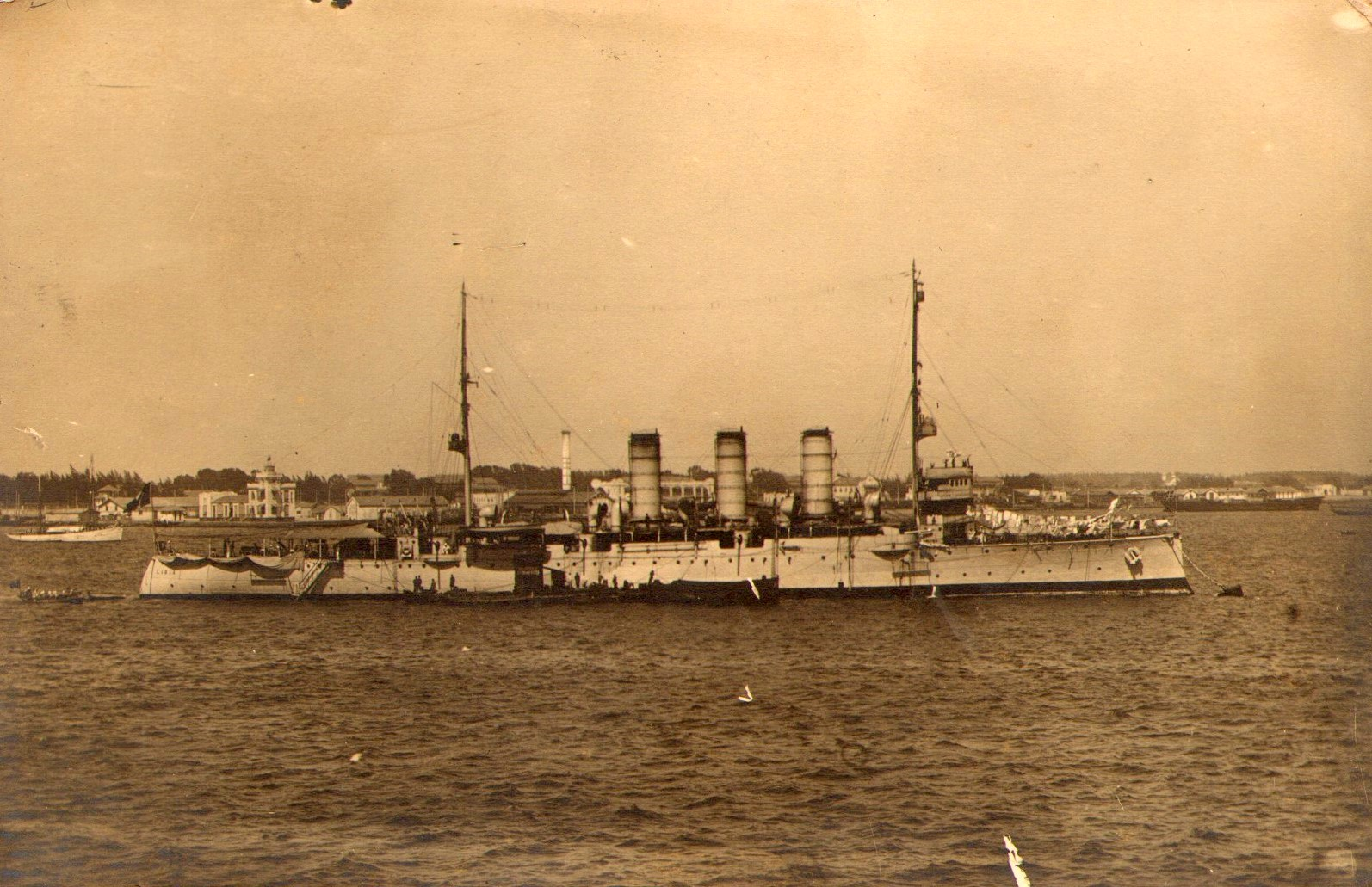
- Libia

Class overview
- Preceded by: Calabria
- Succeeded by: Quarto

History

Ottoman Empire
- Name: Drama
- Namesake: Sanjak of Drama
- Ordered: 1907
- Builder: Gio. Ansaldo & C., Genoa
- Laid down: 1907
- Fate: Seized in September 1911 by the Kingdom of Italy

History

Italy
- Name: Libia
- Namesake: Colony of Libia
- Launched: 11 November 1912
- Acquired: September 1911
- Commissioned: 25 March 1913
- Stricken: 11 March 1937
- Fate: Sold for scrapping, 1937

General characteristics
- Type: Protected cruiser
- Displacement: Normal: 3,760 long tons (3,820 t); Full load: 4,466 long tons (4,538 t)
- Length: 103.6 m (339 ft 11 in) lwl; 111.8 m (366 ft 10 in) oa
- Beam: 14.5 m (47 ft 7 in)
- Draft: 5.5 m (18 ft 1 in)
- Installed power: 16 × Niclausse boilers; 11,530 ihp (8,600 kW)
- Propulsion: 2 × screw propellers; 2 × triple-expansion steam engines
- Speed: 22.9 knots (42.4 km/h; 26.4 mph)
- Range: 3,150 nmi (5,830 km; 3,620 mi) at 10 knots (19 km/h; 12 mph)
- Complement: 14 officers; 300 enlisted men
- Armament: 2 × 152 mm (6 in) guns; 8 × 120 mm (4.7 in) guns; 8 × 47 mm (1.9 in) guns; 6 × 37 mm (1.5 in) guns; 4 × 450 mm (17.7 in) torpedo tubes
- Armor: Deck: 100 mm (3.9 in); Conning tower: 100 mm; Gun shields: 76 mm (3 in)

Libia was a protected cruiser built in Italy in the 1900s. The ship had originally been laid down in 1907 for the Ottoman Navy and was to have been named Drama, and was based on the Ottoman cruiser Hamidiye. She had not been completed by the outbreak of the Italo-Turkish War in 1911 and so she was seized by the Italian Regia Marina (Royal Navy) and was completed in 1913. The ship was armed with two 152 mm (6 in) and eight 120 mm (4.7 in) guns, and was capable of a top speed of over 22 knots (41 km/h; 25 mph).

Libia had a relatively uneventful career. Before Italy's entry into World War I, she was involved in the evacuation of Prince William, the ruler of Albania, from Durazzo in late 1914. Following Italy's declaration of war in May 1915, Libia patrolled the Otranto Barrage but did not see action. In 1921–1922, she went on a world tour, during which she was featured in a short documentary produced by the then-unknown Frank Capra. In 1925 she was deployed to China, where she remained for nearly a decade. In 1937, the old cruiser was stricken from the naval register and sold for scrap.

== Design ==
The design for the new protected cruiser was a copy of the British-built Ottoman cruiser Hamidiye, and was originally intended for sale to the Ottoman Navy. The ship was 103.6 meters (339 ft 11 in) long at the waterline and 111.8 m (366 ft 10 in) long overall. She had a beam of 14.5 m (47 ft 7 in) and a draft of 5.5 m (18 ft 1 in). She displaced 3,760 long tons (3,820 t) normally and up to 4,466 long tons (4,538 t) at full load. The ship was fitted with two pole masts. She had an inverted bow and a flush deck. Her superstructure consisted of a tall conning tower forward and a smaller, secondary conning tower aft of the mainmast. Her crew numbered 14 officers and 300 enlisted men.

Libia was powered by two vertical triple-expansion steam engines, each of which drove a screw propeller. Steam for the engines was provided by sixteen coal-fired Niclausse water-tube boilers that were trunked into three closely spaced funnels on the centerline. The engines were rated at 12,500 indicated horsepower (9,300 kW), though they only reached 11,530 ihp (8,600 kW) in service. This was sufficient to propel the ship at a top speed of 22.9 knots (42.4 km/h; 26.4 mph). Libia had a cruising radius of 3,150 nautical miles (5,830 km; 3,620 mi) at a speed of 10 knots (19 km/h; 12 mph).

The ship was armed with a main battery of two 152 mm (6 in) L/50 quick-firing guns placed in individual pivot mounts, one forward and one astern. These guns were probably Pattern FF Armstrong guns, which fired a 20-kilogram (44 lb) shell at a muzzle velocity of 780 meters per second (2,600 ft/s). These were augmented by a secondary battery of eight 120 mm (4.7 in) L/45 guns, four mounted individually on each broadside. Close-range defense against torpedo boats was provided by a battery of eight 47 mm (1.9 in) L/50 guns and six 37 mm (1.5 in) L/20 guns. She was also equipped with four 450 mm (17.7 in) torpedo tubes.

The ship was protected by a curved armor deck that was 100 mm (4 in) thick, which sloped downward at the sides to protect the ship from incoming fire. Her conning tower had the same thickness of armor plating on the sides. The main guns were protected by 76 mm (3 in) thick gun shields.

== Service history ==
The new cruiser was laid down in 1907 at the Ansaldo shipyard in Genoa for the Ottoman Empire, under the name Drama. But following the rise of the Young Turks in the Ottoman Empire, the Ottoman government became unwilling to pay its foreign debts, which led Ansaldo to halt construction work. Work on the ship only resumed in late 1911 when Italy seized the ship following its declaration of war against the Ottoman Empire in the Italo-Turkish War. The completed hull was launched on 11 November 1912, and following the completion of fitting-out work, the new ship was commissioned on 25 March 1913, having been renamed Libia.

=== World War I ===
On 3 September 1914, Libia was in the port of Durazzo, Albania when Prince William, the ruler of the country, departed following turmoil caused by an insurgency in the country, coupled with the outbreak of World War I. Libia had landed a contingent of marines to restore order in the city, where some 2,000 refugees fleeing the insurgents attempted to board passenger ships bound for Italy. After the refugees were evacuated, Libia recalled her marines and departed as well.

Libia and a US Navy destroyer in Brest, France, shortly after the end of World War I

Italy had declared neutrality at the start of World War I, but by May 1915, the Triple Entente had convinced the Italians to enter the war against the Central Powers. Admiral Paolo Thaon di Revel, the Italian naval chief of staff, believed that the threat from Austro-Hungarian submarines and naval mines in the narrow waters of the Adriatic was too serious for him to use the fleet in an active way. Instead, Revel decided to implement a blockade at the relatively safer southern end of the Adriatic with the main fleet, while smaller vessels, such as the MAS boats, conducted raids on Austro-Hungarian ships and installations. Libia was based at Brindisi in southern Italy to support the Otranto Barrage, along with the protected cruisers Puglia, Quarto, and Nino Bixio, and several destroyers and submarines. The British contributed four cruisers of the British Adriatic Squadron: the light cruisers HMS Weymouth and Bristol and the protected cruisers Topaze and Sapphire. Two French armored cruisers and twelve destroyers rounded out the light forces available to patrol the area.

Libia took part in one of the first actions of the war. Immediately following Italy's entry into the war in May 1915, the Austro-Hungarian fleet launched a major attack on Ancona on 23 and 24 May. Libia briefly saw combat during the latter stage of the raid on the morning of 24 May; she and the armed merchant cruiser SS Cittá di Siracusa engaged the Austro-Hungarian scout cruiser SMS Helgoland as she and the destroyers Tátra and Csepel were withdrawing from the area. The ships exchanged gunfire between 07:10 and 07:19, and Libia struck Helgoland with one shell before the faster Austro-Hungarians were able to disengage from the slower Italian ships.

In early 1916, Libia took part in the last battles at Durrazo, which culminated in the Austro-Hungarian conquest of the city. On 25 February, Libia entered the harbor there to bombard Austro-Hungarian forces to delay their advance while Allied transport vessels evacuated soldiers from the city. She was joined there by the protected cruiser Puglia and the auxiliary cruisers Cittá di Siracusa and SS Cittá di Catania. The battle between the Italian cruisers and Austro-Hungarian artillery batteries continued through the following day, and late on the 26th, the transports completed the embarkation of Italian and Serbian troops before departing for Valona.

In September 1916, Libia was deployed to the Bay of Salamis as part of an Allied fleet in response to the Greek government's refusal to oppose the German and Bulgarian occupation of Eastern Macedonia, which resulted in the Allies seizing the Greek fleet during the Noemvriana. During the war, the ship had three 76 mm L/40 anti-aircraft guns installed.

=== Postwar career ===
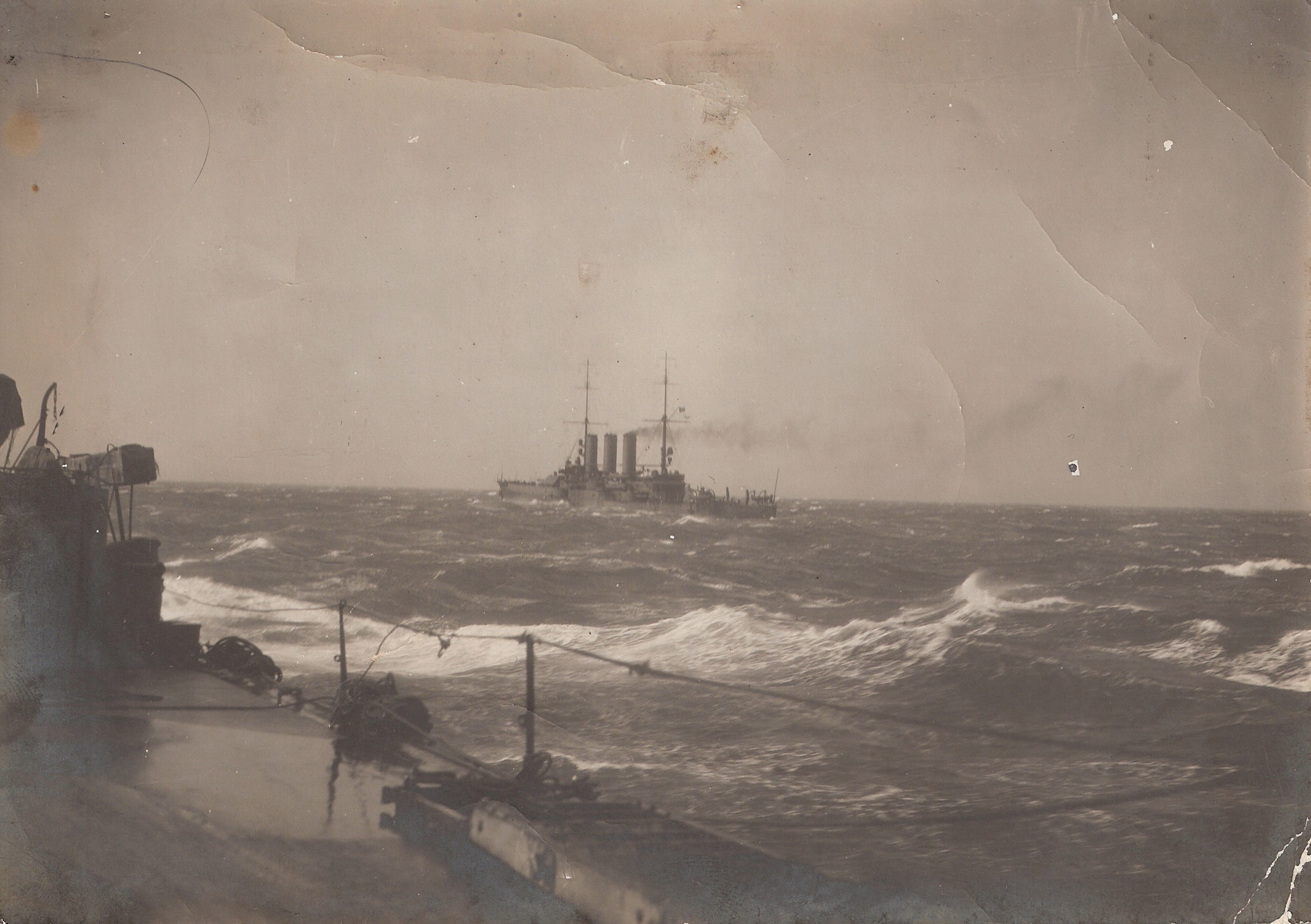
Libia underway during her world tour

Following the Allied victory in World War I, Libia traveled to Britain; she was present for the surrender of German U-boats at Harwich. She carried a number of sailors who were to take the ten U-boats that had been designated as Italian war prizes back to Italy. In March 1919, she sailed into the Thames to visit London, the first time an Italian warship had entered the port of London. There, her captain was invited to speak at the Royal United Services Institute.

In 1921 the ship went on a world tour under the command of Captain (later Admiral) Ernesto Burzagli. While passing through the Panama Canal in late 1921, Libia stopped in Balboa, Panama, for minor repairs that included her drainage and water systems. During the cruise, she stopped in San Francisco, United States in November, where she stayed for a month. While there, she was filmed for a short documentary by the then-unknown film director Frank Capra on 6 and 7 November—though it did not generate much attention, it was Capra's first publicly screened film. The ship departed San Francisco on 4 December. In 1922, Libia visited Australia while on her tour. In December that year, she was in Colombo, British Ceylon, when a flotilla of three Japanese cruisers visited the port.

In 1925, her 152 mm guns were removed. That year, she was sent to China, where she joined the armored cruisers San Marco and San Giorgio and the river gunboats Caboto and Carlotto. These ships contributed men to form the Battaglione Italiano in China (Italian Battalion in China); the contingents from Libia were sent to guard the consulates in Beijing and Shanhaiguan.

On 28 March 1929, Libia collided with the Chinese coastal steamer SS Kangtai off Woosung, China. Kangtai sank with the loss of 30 crew members. Libia remained in Chinese waters for nearly a decade; by 1931, the Italian flotilla in East Asian waters consisted of Libia, Caboto, and Carlotto. After the September 1931 Mukden Incident and subsequent Japanese invasion of Manchuria, Italy sent the new heavy cruiser Trento in February 1932. Later in the early 1930s, she was replaced by the protected cruiser Quarto. In September 1935 she was drydocked to prepare for her disposal. She was stricken from the naval register on 11 March 1937 and was sold to ship breakers.
