= Nino Bixio-class cruiser =

Protected cruiser class of the Italian Royal Navy

- Illustration of Marsala

Class overview
- Name: Nino Bixio class
- Operators: Regia Marina
- Preceded by: Quarto
- Succeeded by: Campania class
- Built: 1911–1914
- In commission: 1914–1929
- Completed: 2
- Scrapped: 2

General characteristics
- Type: Protected cruiser
- Displacement: Normal: 3,575 long tons (3,632 t); Full load: 4,141 long tons (4,207 t)
- Length: 140.3 m (460 ft 4 in)
- Beam: 13 m (42 ft 8 in)
- Draft: 4.1 m (13 ft 5 in)
- Installed power: 14 × Blechynden boilers; 23,000 shp (17,000 kW)
- Propulsion: 3 × steam turbines; 3 × screw propellers
- Speed: 26.82 to 27.66 kn (49.67 to 51.23 km/h; 30.86 to 31.83 mph)
- Range: 1,400 nmi (2,600 km; 1,600 mi) at 13 kn (24 km/h; 15 mph)
- Complement: 13 officers; 283 enlisted men
- Armament: 6 × 120 mm (4.7 in) guns; 6 × 76 mm (3 in) guns; 2 × 450 mm (17.7 in) torpedo tubes; 200 naval mines
- Armor: Deck: 38 mm (1.5 in); Conning tower: 100 mm (3.9 in)

The Nino Bixio class was a pair of protected cruisers built for the Italian Regia Marina (Royal Navy) in the 1910s. The two ships, Nino Bixio, and Marsala, were built in Castellammare between 1911 and 1914. They were intended to serve as scouts for the main Italian fleet, and as such required a high top speed. They were overweight as built, which prevented them from reaching their intended maximum speed. They were a disappointment in service, especially compared to the earlier—and faster—cruiser Quarto, which cut their careers short.

Both ships saw limited action during World War I, largely a result of the cautious strategies employed by the Regia Marina and its opponent, the Austro-Hungarian Navy. Nino Bixio was involved in the pursuit of a group of Austro-Hungarian raiders in December 1915, but did not engage them before they escaped. Marsala briefly battled Austro-Hungarian cruisers during the Battle of the Otranto Straits in May 1917. Both ships were sold for scrapping in the late 1920s, the victims of very tight naval budgets and their own poor performance.

== Design ==
In the early 1900s, the major naval powers were grappling with shifting technological, tactical, and strategic developments. For the later decades of the 19th century, the Italian fleet was oriented against the French Navy. But by the early 1900s, Italian navy officers returned to viewing their traditional rival across the Adriatic Sea, the Austro-Hungarian Navy, as the primary threat. At the same time, the development of more effective fire-control systems allowed ships to fight at longer ranges, and tactical developments identified during the recent Russo-Japanese War (specifically the concept of crossing the T) led to the need for high-speed fleet scouts so that commanders could maneuver their fleet more effectively. The Austro-Hungarians developed the light cruiser Admiral Spaun to fill this need, which prompted the Italian response with the protected cruiser Quarto. Before work on Quarto was completed, the Italian Minister of the Navy, Admiral Carlo Mirabello, ordered two more ships, which became the Nino Bixio class, to supplement Quarto. These ships were designed by Engineering Captain Giuseppe Rota, along similar lines to the cruiser Quarto.

=== General characteristics and machinery ===
Plan and profile drawing of the Nino Bixio class

The ships were 131.4 meters (431 ft 1 in) long at the waterline and 140.3 m (460 ft 4 in) long overall. They had a beam of 13 m (42 ft 8 in) and a draft of 4.1 m (13 ft 5 in). The ships displaced 3,575 long tons (3,632 t) normally and up to 4,141 long tons (4,207 t) at full load. Their hulls had an unusual convex shape to the bow. They had a short forecastle deck that extended for the first third of the length of the hull. The ships were fitted with a pair of pole masts equipped with spotting tops located at the forward and aft conning tower. Their crew consisted of 13 officers and 283 enlisted men. The Nino Bixio-class ships were only lightly armored, with a curved armor deck that was 38 mm (1.5 in) thick and sloped downward at the sides, where it connected to the sides of the hull. They had 100 mm (3.9 in) thick plating on their forward conning tower, and their guns were fitted with thin gun shields.

The ships' propulsion system consisted of three Curtiss steam turbines, each driving a screw propeller. Steam was provided by fourteen mixed coal and oil firing Blechynden boilers that were trunked into four funnels; the first two were closely spaced just aft of the foremast and the other two were farther spaced further aft. The engines were rated for 22,500 shaft horsepower (16,800 kW) which should have given the ships a top speed of 29 knots (54 km/h; 33 mph), but neither ship reached that speed in service owing to their being overweight. Nino Bixio's engines reached 23,000 shp (17,000 kW) for a top speed of 26.82 kn (49.67 km/h; 30.86 mph), while Marsala was slightly faster at 27.66 kn (51.23 km/h; 31.83 mph) at the same horsepower.

Both ships were a disappointment, especially compared to the older but faster Quarto. The Curtiss turbines, built in Italy under license, proved to be unreliable in service, and they could not propel the ships at their intended speed. Repeated efforts to correct the defects and modify the boilers failed to produce the desired results. The Nino Bixio-class ships had a cruising range of 1,400 nautical miles (2,600 km; 1,600 mi) at an economical speed of 13 kn (24 km/h; 15 mph).

=== Armament ===
The ships were armed with a main battery of six 120 mm (4.7 in) L/50 guns mounted singly. (Note: L/50 refers to the length of the gun in terms of caliber.) Two were placed side by side forward, two were placed en echelon amidships, and the last two were mounted in a superfiring pair aft of the mainmast. The amidships guns were placed en echelon, and were spaced with the funnels so as to allow them to fire across the deck. The guns were the Pattern EE type, the same type employed as secondary guns on the dreadnought battleships of the Dante Alighieri and Conte di Cavour classes, and were manufactured by Armstrong Whitworth. They were 3.35-metric-ton (3.30-long-ton; 3.69-short-ton) guns that fired a 22.5-kilogram (50 lb) projectile at a muzzle velocity of 860 meters per second (2,800 ft/s), at a rate of 6 shots per minute.

The ships were also equipped with a secondary battery of six 76 mm (3 in) L/50 guns, the same Pattern ZZI type guns used on the Italian dreadnoughts, which provided close range defense against torpedo boats. These guns weighed 1.14 t (1.12 long tons; 1.26 short tons) and fired 5.6 kg (12 lb) and 7 kg (15 lb) shells at 815 m/s (2,670 ft/s). They had a rate of fire of 15 shells per minute. Four of the guns were placed on the forecastle, astern of the main battery guns; two were abreast the conning tower, while the other pair were en echelon with the first set of funnels. The remaining two guns were placed further aft, abreast the superfiring main battery gun. They were also armed with two 450 mm (17.7 in) torpedo tubes submerged in the hull; they were located amidships, one tube per broadside. The ships were also fitted with equipment to store and launch 200 naval mines.

== Ships ==
Construction data
Name	Builder	Laid down	Launched	Commissioned
Nino Bixio	Castellammare	15 February 1911	31 December 1911	5 May 1914
Marsala	Castellammare	15 February 1911	24 March 1912	4 August 1914

== Service history ==
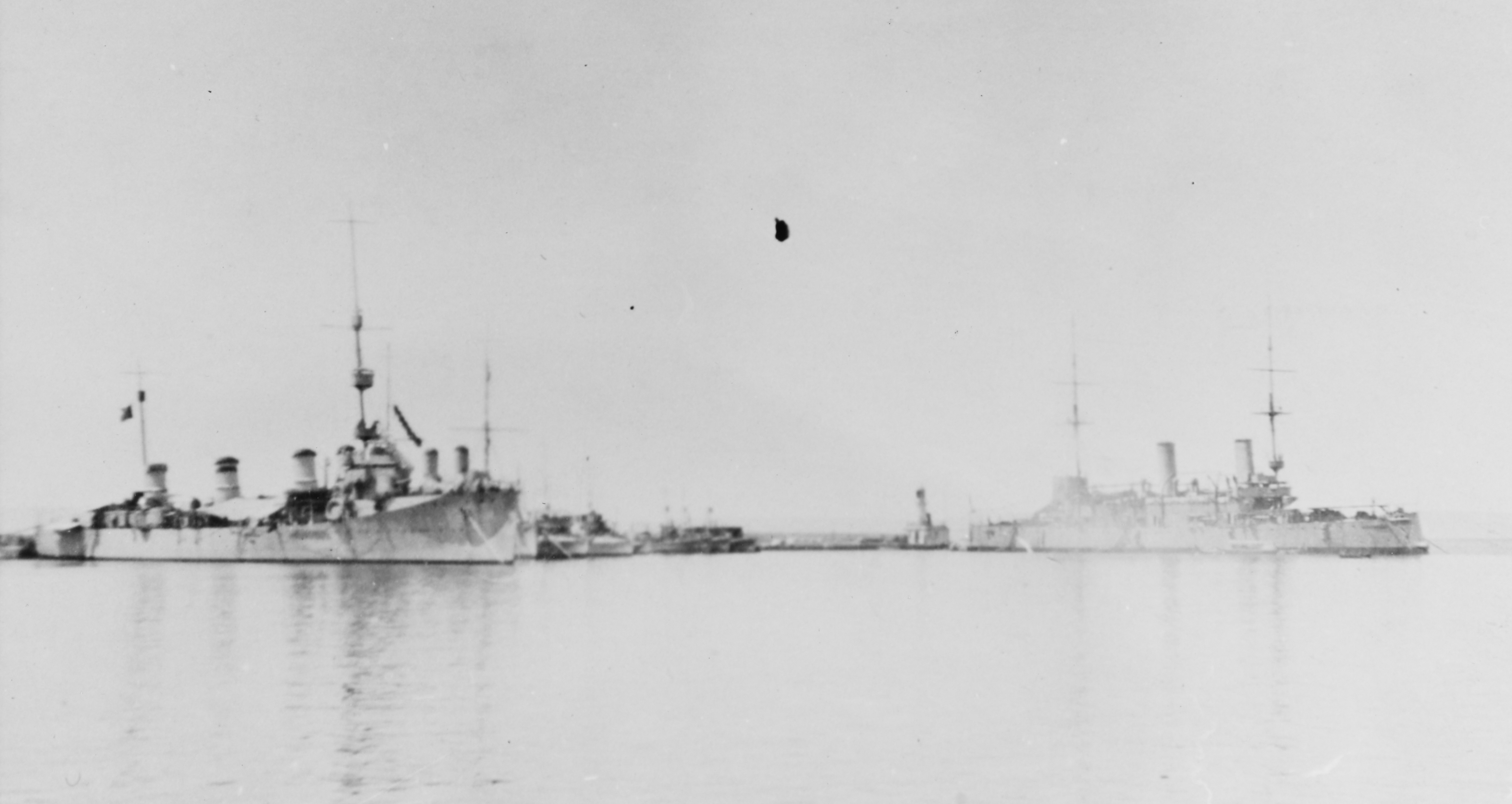
Nino Bixio (left) and other warships in Split in 1919

Nino Bixio had entered service just before the start of World War I in July 1914, but Italy had initially declared neutrality at the start of the conflict, despite having been allied to Germany and Austria-Hungary. By May 1915, the Triple Entente had convinced the Italian government to enter the war against their erstwhile allies. The main Italian fleet was kept at the southern end of the Adriatic, at Brindisi, and in the Mediterranean, at Taranto, where it would be safe from Austro-Hungarian U-boats. The Austro-Hungarians, meanwhile, employed a fleet in being strategy while conducting raids with small craft and U-boats. For the duration of the war, Nino Bixio and Marsala were stationed at Brindisi, where they could quickly respond to Austro-Hungarian raids. In December 1915, Nino Bixio and several other warships, including British cruisers, sortied in response to an Austro-Hungarian attack on transports supplying the Serbian Army through Albania. Nino Bixio pursued the cruiser SMS Helgoland before the latter escaped under cover of darkness.

Marsala saw action during the Battle of the Otranto Straits in May 1917, though Nino Bixio did not have steam up in her boilers when the Austro-Hungarians attacked, so she was unable to join her sister ship. Marsala briefly clashed with the Austro-Hungarian cruisers before Rear Admiral Alfredo Acton, the Italian commander, broke off the engagement following the arrival of the powerful Austro-Hungarian armored cruiser SMS Sankt Georg. The demobilizations and funding cuts that followed the end of the war in 1918 continued into the 1920s for the Regia Marina, and disposing of the two Nino Bixio class ships, which had never met design expectations, was an easy means to trim the naval budget. Nino Bixio and Marsala were stricken from the naval register in March 1929 and November 1927, respectively, and were subsequently sold for scrap.
