= Italian cruiser Quarto =

Protected cruiser of the Italian Royal Navy

- Illustration of Quarto

Class overview
- Preceded by: Libia
- Succeeded by: Nino Bixio class

History

Italy
- Name: Quarto
- Builder: Venetian Arsenal
- Laid down: 14 November 1909
- Launched: 19 August 1911
- Commissioned: 31 March 1913
- Fate: Sunk in weapons tests, November 1940

General characteristics
- Type: Protected cruiser
- Displacement: Normal: 3,271 long tons (3,323 t); Full load: 3,442 long tons (3,497 t)
- Length: 131.6 m (431 ft 9 in)
- Beam: 12.8 m (42 ft)
- Draft: 4.1 m (13 ft 5 in)
- Installed power: 10 × Blechynden boilers; 25,000 shp (19,000 kW)
- Propulsion: 4 × steam turbines; 4 × screw propellers
- Speed: 28 knots (52 km/h; 32 mph)
- Range: 2,300 nmi (4,300 km; 2,600 mi) at 15 kn (28 km/h; 17 mph)
- Complement: 13 officers; 234 enlisted men
- Armament: 6 × 120 mm (4.7 in) guns; 6 × 76 mm (3 in) guns; 2 × 450 mm (17.7 in) torpedo tubes; 200 naval mines
- Armor: Deck: 38 mm (1.5 in); Conning tower: 100 mm (3.9 in)

Quarto was a unique protected cruiser built by the Italian Regia Marina (Royal Navy) in the 1910s. Her keel was laid in November 1909, she was launched in August 1911, and was completed in March 1913. She was the first Italian cruiser to be equipped with steam turbines, which gave her a top speed of 28 knots (52 km/h; 32 mph). Her high speed was a requirement for the role in which she was designed to serve: a scout for the main Italian fleet.

Quarto was based at Brindisi during World War I; she saw action once, during an attack by the Austro-Hungarian Navy on transports operating in the southern Adriatic. She engaged the Austro-Hungarian cruiser SMS Helgoland but neither ship was damaged and both sides withdrew. Quarto served briefly in East Asian waters in the early 1930s, and supported Italian forces during the Second Italo-Abyssinian War in 1936. The following year she served as the flagship of the Italian forces participating in the non-intervention patrols during the Spanish Civil War; here she was attacked by Republican bombers, although she escaped damage. She was stricken from the naval register in January 1939 and subsequently used in weapons tests with human torpedoes and explosive motorboats. Quarto was sunk in a test with an MT explosive motorboat in November 1940.

== Design ==
The Austro-Hungarian cruiser SMS Admiral Spaun

Quarto was ordered and designed in the context of shifting technological, tactical, and strategic factors. For the later decades of the 19th century, the Italian fleet was oriented against the French Navy. But by the early 1900s, Italian navy officers returned to viewing their traditional rival across the Adriatic Sea, the Austro-Hungarian Navy, as the primary threat. At the same time, the development of more effective fire-control systems allowed ships to fight at longer ranges, and tactical developments identified during the recent Russo-Japanese War (specifically the concept of crossing the T) led to the need for high-speed fleet scouts so that commanders could maneuver their fleet more effectively. The Austro-Hungarians developed the light cruiser Admiral Spaun to fill this need, which prompted the Italian response with Quarto.

Quarto was designed by Lieutenant Commander Giulio Truccone, and was intended to serve as a scout for the main fleet. As such, she was equipped with steam turbines, which produced higher speeds than the older triple-expansion steam engines used on earlier cruisers. She was the first Italian cruiser so equipped. Quarto was also the third vessel of the Italian fleet to use Blechynden boilers for her propulsion system. (Note: The other two vessels were the dreadnought battleship Dante Alighieri and the armored cruiser San Giorgio.)

Quarto was reported to have had seakeeping qualities; the contemporary journal The Marine Engineer and Naval Architect observed that it was likely the result of the ship being overloaded for her size, and noted that the problem also afflicted the subsequent Nino Bixio-class cruisers. According to the Italian naval historian Aldo Fraccaroli, however, Quarto was "one of the more successful ships of the Italian Navy". Quarto also remained in service for more than twenty-five years, compared to less than fifteen for either of the Nino-Bixio-class cruisers.

=== General characteristics and machinery ===
Plan and profile drawing of Quarto

Quarto was 126 meters (413 ft 5 in) long at the waterline and 131.6 m (431 ft 9 in) long overall. She had a beam of 12.8 m (42 ft) and a draft of 4.1 m (13 ft 5 in), the latter being very shallow for a vessel of her size. She displaced 3,271 long tons (3,323 t) normally and up to 3,442 long tons (3,497 t) at full load. Quarto had a minimal superstructure, consisting of a main conning tower forward and a small, secondary conning tower further aft. Her hull had a slightly curved ram bow. The ship was fitted with a pair of pole masts at the main and rear conning towers, the masts carrying spotting tops. She had a short forecastle deck that had a slight whaleback shape; it extended for the first third of the ship, stepping down to the main deck just aft of the forward conning tower. A raised platform supported the aft pair of guns. She had a crew of 13 officers and 234 enlisted men.

The ship's propulsion system consisted of a four Parsons steam turbines, each driving a single screw propeller, with steam supplied by eight oil-fired and two coal-and-oil-fired Blechynden water-tube boilers. The boilers were trunked into three closely spaced funnels amidships. The engines were rated at 25,000 shaft horsepower (19,000 kW) for a top speed of 28 knots (52 km/h; 32 mph), but on trials she exceeded both figures, reaching 29,215 shp (21,786 kW) and 28.61 knots (52.99 km/h; 32.92 mph). Quarto had a cruising radius of about 2,300 nautical miles (4,300 km; 2,600 mi) at a speed of 15 knots (28 km/h; 17 mph), and up to 588 nmi (1,089 km; 677 mi) when steaming at top speed.

=== Armament and armor ===
Quarto was armed with a main battery of six 120 mm (4.7 in) L/50 guns mounted singly; (Note: L/50 refers to the length of the gun in terms of caliber.) two were placed side by side on the forecastle, two on the main deck further aft, and two on the upper deck astern of the rear conning tower. These last two guns were slightly offset, with the port gun further aft. The guns were the Pattern EE type, the same type employed as secondary guns on the dreadnought battleships of the Dante Alighieri and Conte di Cavour classes, and were manufactured by Armstrong Whitworth. A secondary battery of six 76 mm (3 in) L/50 guns, the same Pattern ZZI type guns used on the Italian dreadnoughts, provided close range defense against torpedo boats. These were placed abreast the funnels, three on either side of the ship. She was also armed with two 450 mm (17.7 in) torpedo tubes in deck-mounted launchers, though shortly after her commissioning, these were replaced with submerged tubes. The torpedo tubes were placed in the ship's stern. Quarto was designed to carry 200 naval mines.

The ship was only lightly armored, being protected by a curved armor deck that was 38 mm (1.5 in) thick and sloped downward at the sides, where it connected to the sides of the hull. The forward conning tower had 100 mm (3.9 in) thick sides. Her main battery guns were protected with thin gun shields.

== Service history ==
Quarto in port, date unknown

Quarto was built at the Regia Marina dockyard in Venice, with her keel being laid down on 14 November 1909. Her completed hull was launched on 19 August 1911, and after fitting-out work was finished in early 1913, she was commissioned into the fleet on 31 March 1913. Her initial testing revealed excessive problems with the oil-fired boilers, so they were converted to burn coal only. By 1914, Quarto had been assigned to the 1st Division of the 1st Squadron; the squadron consisted of two divisions of armored cruisers, each supported by a scout cruiser. Quarto's division also included the dreadnought battleships Dante Alighieri and two of the Conte di Cavour-class battleships.

=== World War I ===
Italy declared neutrality at the start of World War I in August 1914, but by July 1915, the Triple Entente had convinced the Italians to enter the war against the Central Powers; Italy's primary opponent in the Adriatic was the Austro-Hungarian Navy. Admiral Paolo Thaon di Revel, the Italian naval chief of staff, believed that Austro-Hungarian submarines could operate too effectively in the narrow waters of the Adriatic, which could also be easily seeded with minefields. The threat from these underwater weapons was too serious for him to use the fleet in an active way. Instead, Revel decided to implement blockade at the relatively safer southern end of the Adriatic with the main fleet, while smaller vessels, such as the MAS boats, conducted raids on Austro-Hungarian ships and installations.

Quarto was based at Brindisi in southern Italy to support the Otranto Barrage, along with the protected cruisers Puglia, Nino Bixio, and Libia, and several destroyers and submarines. The British contributed four cruisers of the British Adriatic Squadron: the light cruisers HMS Weymouth and Bristol and the protected cruisers Topaze and Sapphire. Two French armored cruisers and twelve destroyers rounded out the light forces available to patrol the area. During the war, enemy submarines frequently misjudged Quarto's speed as a result of her very shallow draft, which produced a misleading wave pattern on the hull. The ship escaped torpedoing on numerous occasions due to this factor.

On 29 December 1915, an Austro-Hungarian force of two cruisers and five destroyers attempted to intercept transports supplying the Serbian Army trapped in Albania. Quarto, flying the flag of Rear Admiral Silvio Bellini, and the British cruiser HMS Dartmouth, along with five French destroyers, sortied from Brindisi to intercept the Austro-Hungarians. Nino Bixio, Weymouth and four Italian destroyers followed two hours later. Quarto and Dartmouth pursued the cruiser SMS Helgoland and fought a long-range gun battle as the Austro-Hungarian ship tried to escape. At the start of the action, Quarto initially opened fire on the Austro-Hungarian destroyer SMS Csepel and Quarto hit her once, but Helgoland dropped behind to draw Quarto's fire. In the course of their engagement, Quarto hit Helgoland five times. It was hoped that the Quarto and Dartmouth group, which was further to the north, would be able to drive the Austro-Hungarian flotilla toward Nino Bixio and Weymouth, but the faster Austro-Hungarian ships were able to escape the trap in the gathering darkness. Poor coordination between the Italian, British, and French ships led to their failure to decisively engage the Austro-Hungarians, but the latter nevertheless lost two of their six best destroyers.

By May 1917, Bellini had been replaced by Rear Admiral Alfredo Acton. Quarto was unable to get underway to participate in the Battle of the Otranto Straits because she did not have steam up in her boilers when the Italo-British force at Brindisi learned of the Austro-Hungarian raid on the Otranto Barrage.

=== Postwar career ===
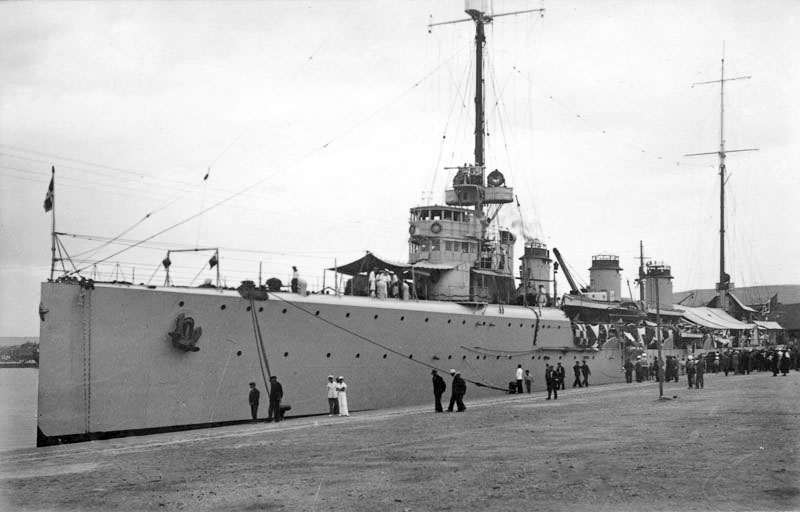
Quarto at the port of Varna in July 1932

In February 1920, Quarto came to the aid of the French steamship SS Pigeon, which had broken down off the coast of Sicily. She towed the French vessel into Syracuse for repairs. Quarto was modified in 1926–1927 to handle a Macchi M.18 seaplane.

In the early 1930s, Quarto was sent to East Asian waters, where she replaced the cruiser Libia. Quarto made a visit to Yokohama, Japan, in April 1934 as part of a mutual exchange of goodwill visits. The ship's captain and the Italian naval attache met with the Japanese naval minister, Admiral Mineo Ōsumi. In return, a pair of Japanese cruisers and a flotilla leader visited Italian ports later the same month. The ship's stay there was short lived, as she was transferred to Africa to support the Second Italo-Ethiopian War in 1935–1936.

Three of her 76 mm guns were replaced with 13.2 mm (0.52 in) machine guns in 1936. She thereafter served as the flagship of Rear Admiral Alberto di Moriondo, the commander of Italian warships operating off Spain with the non-intervention patrols during the Spanish Civil War. On 24 May 1937, Spanish Republican bombers nearly hit the ship while she was moored in Palma, Majorca. She remained with the naval forces patrolling Spanish waters into 1938. The ship suffered a boiler explosion while moored in the Port de Pollença, Majorca, on 1 August 1938, which killed seven men. She steamed to La Spezia on 18 August to be evaluated, but it was determined that it was not worth the cost of repairing her.

Quarto remained in service for a short time longer, and she was stricken from the naval register on 5 January 1939. She was subsequently towed from La Spezia to Livorno, where her hull was used for experiments. These tests included a trial of the new SLC human torpedo, which was later used by the Decima Flottiglia MAS, in La Spezia in early 1940. During the test one of the three SLCs reached the ship and successfully planted dummy explosives; these weapons were later used to disable the battleships HMS Valiant and HMS Queen Elizabeth in the raid on Alexandria during World War II. On 13 November 1940, tests with two of the new MT explosive motorboats with reduced charges were carried out. The MT boats were later used to sink the cruiser HMS York at Souda Bay. The MT boat test caused significant damage to Quarto, even with the reduced explosives, and she quickly sank in shallow water; her wreck continued to be used to test new shell designs into 1941.
