= SMS Saida (1912) =

Scout cruiser of the Austro-Hungarian Navy

- Saida underway in 1914

History

Austria-Hungary
- Name: SMS Saida
- Namesake: Corvette Saida (1879), commemorating the capture of Sidon (1840)
- Builder: CNT, Monfalcone
- Laid down: 9 September 1911
- Launched: 26 October 1912
- Completed: 1 August 1914
- Fate: Ceded to Italy, 19 September 1920

Italy
- Name: Venezia
- Namesake: Venice, Italy
- Acquired: 19 September 1920
- Stricken: 11 March 1937
- Fate: Scrapped, 1937

General characteristics (as built)
- Class & type: Novara-class scout cruiser
- Displacement: 3,500 long tons (3,600 t)
- Length: 130.64 m (428 ft 7 in)
- Beam: 12.79 m (42 ft 0 in)
- Draft: 4.6 m (15 ft 1 in)
- Installed power: 25,600 shp (19,100 kW)
- Propulsion: 2 shafts; 2 Melms-Pfenniger steam turbines; 16 Yarrow water-tube boilers
- Speed: 27 knots (50 km/h; 31 mph)
- Range: 1,600 nmi (3,000 km; 1,800 mi) at a speed of 24 knots (44 km/h; 28 mph)
- Complement: 340
- Armament: 9 × 1 - 10 cm (3.9 in) guns; 1 × 7 cm (2.8 in) anti-aircraft gun; 1 × 47 mm (1.9 in) SFK L/44 gun; 6 x twin 53.3 cm (21.0 in) torpedo tubes
- Armor: Waterline belt: 60 mm (2.4 in); Deck: 20 mm (0.8 in)

SMS Saida was a Novara-class scout cruiser built for the Austro-Hungarian Navy in the early 1910s. The ship was armed with a main battery of nine 10 cm (3.9 in) guns, and six twin 53.3 cm (21.0 in) torpedo tubes were added in 1917. She was built by the Cantiere Navale Triestino shipyard from 1911 to 1914, entering service days after the outbreak of World War I. She spent the war as a flotilla leader, conducting raids and patrols in the narrow waters of the Adriatic Sea.

In May 1917, Saida took part in the Battle of the Strait of Otranto, the largest naval action in the course of the war in the Adriatic. Saida was tasked with provoking a final fleet confrontation in June 1918, but the attack was called off after the dreadnought battleship SMS Szent Istvan was sunk by an Italian motor torpedo boat. Saida was ceded to Italy after the war and commissioned as Venezia. She served in the Regia Marina (Royal Navy) from 1921 to 1937, ending her career as a barracks ship after 1930. The ship was ultimately broken up for scrap in 1937. The three Novara class cruisers were the largest vessels of the former Austro-Hungarian Navy to see service in foreign navies after the war.

== Design ==
Saida was 130.64 meters (428 ft 7 in) long overall, with a beam of 12.79 meters (42 ft 0 in) and a mean draft of 4.6 meters (15 ft 1 in). She displaced 3,500 long tons (3,600 t) at normal load, and up to 4,017 long tons (4,081 t) at deep load. Her propulsion system consisted of two sets of Melms-Pfenniger steam turbines driving two propeller shafts. They were designed to provide 25,600 shaft horsepower (19,100 kW) and were powered by 16 Yarrow water-tube boilers. These gave the ship a top speed of 27 knots (50 km/h; 31 mph). Saida carried about 710 metric tons (700 long tons) of coal that gave her a range of approximately 1,600 nautical miles (3,000 km; 1,800 mi) at 24 knots (44 km/h; 28 mph). The ship had a crew of 340 officers and men.

Saida was armed with nine 50-caliber 10 cm (3.9 in) guns in single pedestal mounts. Three were placed forward on the forecastle, four were located amidships, two on either side, and two were side by side on the quarterdeck. A Škoda 7-centimeter (2.8 in)/50 K10 anti-aircraft gun and six 53.3 cm (21.0 in) torpedo tubes in twin mounts were added in 1917. The navy planned to remove the guns on the forecastle and quarterdeck and replace them with a pair of 15-centimeter (5.9 in) guns fore and aft, but nothing was done before the end of the war. The ship was protected by a waterline armored belt that was 60 mm (2.4 in) thick amidships. The conning tower had 60 mm thick sides, and the deck was 20 mm (0.79 in) thick.

== Service history ==
Saida was laid down at the Cantiere Navale Triestino shipyard in Monfalcone on 9 September 1911. Her completed hull was launched on 26 October 1912, and construction, including fitting-out, was completed by 1 August 1914, four days after Austria-Hungary declared war on Serbia. Following the outbreak of World War I, Saida was assigned as the flotilla leader for the First Torpedo Flotilla, which included the six Tátra-class destroyers, six Huszár-class destroyers, ten torpedo boats, and a depot ship. Following the Italian declaration of war against Austria-Hungary in May 1915, most of the Austro-Hungarian fleet sortied in a surprise attack on various points on the Italian coast. During the operation, Saida, her sister Helgoland, the cruisers Admiral Spaun and Szigetvár, and nine destroyers provided a screen against a possible Italian counterattack, which did not materialize.

The ship's first combat came on 17 August 1915 when she, Helgoland, and four destroyers bombarded Italian forces on the island of Pelagosa which had recently been occupied by the Italians. In late 1915, the Austro-Hungarian Navy began a series of raids against the merchant ships supplying Allied forces in Serbia and Montenegro. On the night of 22 November 1915, Saida, Helgoland, and the 1st Torpedo Division raided the Albanian coast and sank a pair of Italian transports carrying flour. Chronic problems with Saida's turbines prevented her from being used for much of the war, leaving Helgoland and SMS Novara to shoulder most of the burden of the naval war in the Adriatic.

=== Battle of the Strait of Otranto ===
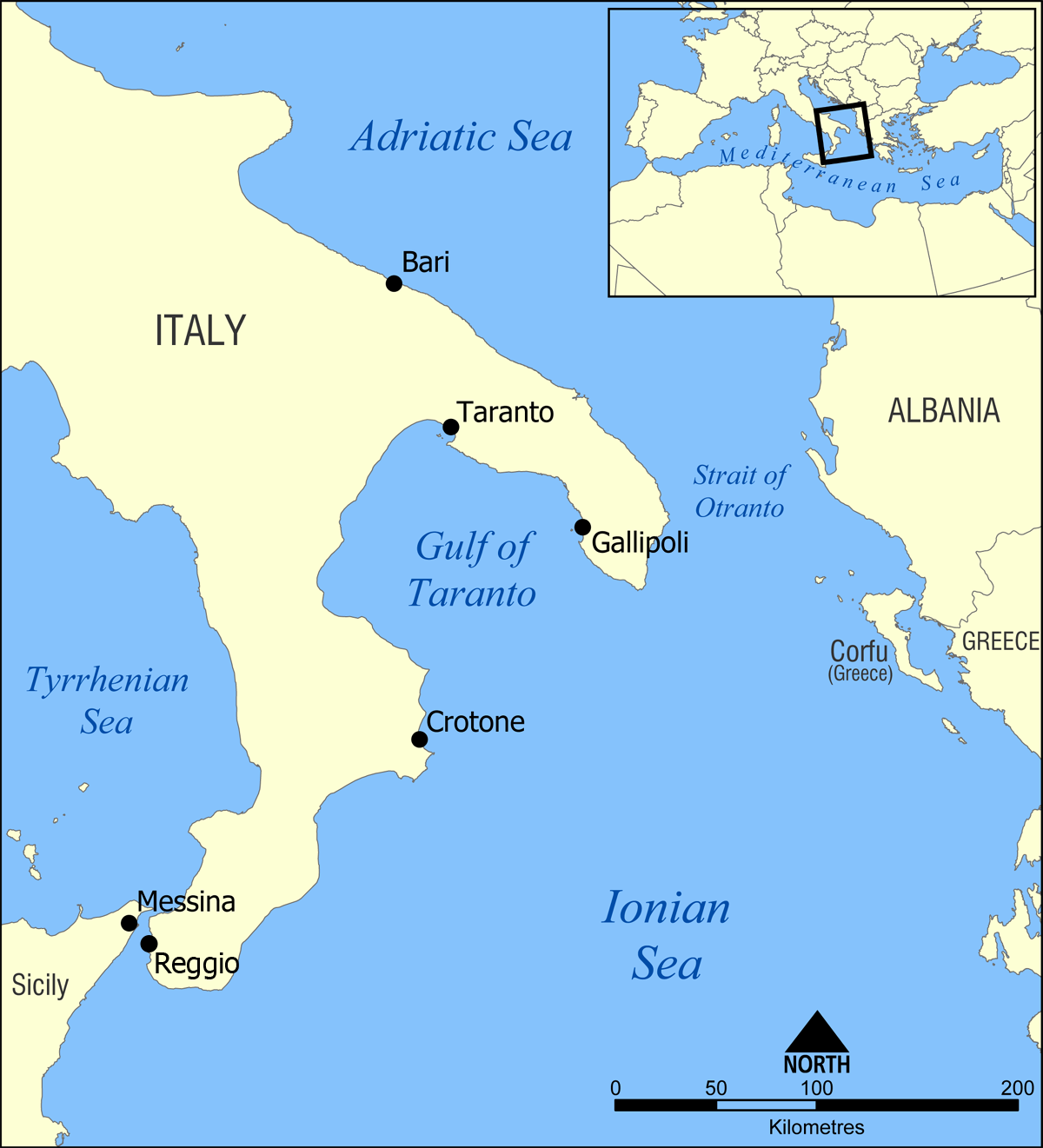
Map showing the location of the Straits of Otranto at the southern end of the Adriatic

In May 1917, captain Miklós Horthy planned a major raid on the drifters of the Otranto Barrage, using a force composed of the three Novara-class cruisers. The three cruisers were modified to resemble destroyers, and where thoroughly overhauled in preparation for the attack. Their boilers and turbines were cleaned to ensure the highest efficiency, and an anti-aircraft gun was installed on each ship. The ships were to attack separately while two destroyers made a diversionary attack on the drifters near the Albanian coast. On the night of 14 May, the ships departed port and managed to pass through the line of drifters in the darkness without being identified. As the sounds from the diversionary attack were heard, the drifters released their nets and began to head towards the Strait of Otranto. At 03:45, Saida and the other cruisers began their attacks on the drifters, though Saida stopped her engines and drifted toward the patrol vessels for about 30 minutes to conceal her position. Saida opened fire at 4:20, setting three drifters on fire, before stopping to pick up nineteen survivors.

The Austrian ships were first contacted during their retreat by a group of three French destroyers led by a small Italian scout cruiser, Carlo Mirabello, but the heavier guns of the Austrian ships dissuaded the Allied commander from pressing an attack. They were intercepted shortly afterward by a stronger group of two British light cruisers, Bristol and Dartmouth, escorted by four Italian destroyers. Dartmouth opened fire with her 6-inch (152 mm) guns at a range of 10,600 yards (9,700 m) and Horthy ordered his ships to lay a smoke screen several minutes later. Horthy called for reinforcements that came in the form of the armored cruiser Sankt Georg, which sortied with two destroyers and four torpedo boats. The heavy smoke nearly caused the three Austrian cruisers to collide, but it covered them from the fire from the British ships as they closed the range. When they emerged, the Austrian ships were only about 4,900 yards (4,500 m) from the British, a range much more suitable for the smaller Austrian guns.

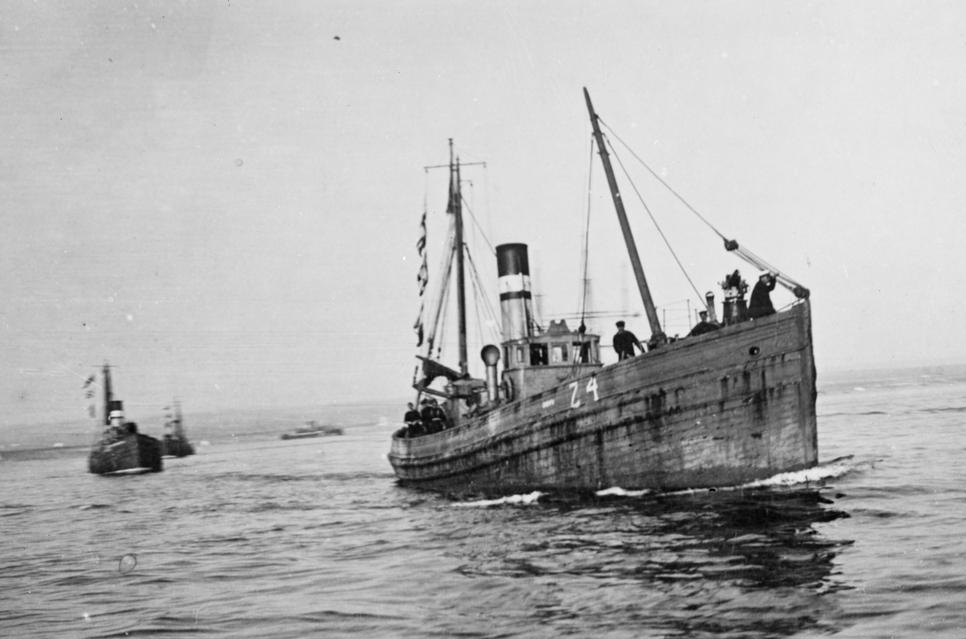
British drifters sailing from their base in the Adriatic to the Barrage

The three cruisers were gradually drawing away from their pursuers when Novara, leading the Austrian ships, was hit several times. Novara's boilers were disabled, leaving her dead in the water. Saida was preparing to take Novara under tow when several Italian destroyers attacked in succession. The weight of fire from the three cruisers prevented them from closing to torpedo range and they scored no hits. Sankt Georg arrived and Saida took Novara under tow for the voyage back to port. The four cruisers assembled in line-ahead formation, with Sankt Georg the last vessel in the line, to cover the other three ships. Later in the afternoon, the old coastal defense ship Budapest and three more torpedo boats joined the ships to strengthen the escort.

The ship was tasked to participate in a major attack on the Allied ships defending the Strait of Otranto on 11 June 1918. Saida, Admiral Spaun, and four torpedo boats were to have attacked the seaplane base at Otranto to draw out the Allied fleet. The operation was called off after the dreadnought SMS Szent István was sunk by an Italian motor torpedo boat en route to the rendezvous for the operation. On 3 November 1918, the Austro-Hungarian government signed the Armistice of Villa Giusti with Italy, ending their participation in the conflict. Following the armistice, the entire Austro-Hungarian fleet was transferred to the newly formed Yugoslavia.

=== Italian service ===
In 1920, under the terms of the Treaty of Saint-Germain-en-Laye, Saida and the rest of the fleet was surrendered to the Allied powers as war prizes. The ship was ceded to Italy, where she was commissioned as Venezia on 5 July 1921; she and her sisters were the largest vessels of the former Austro-Hungarian Navy to see active service in the navies of their former enemies. Venezia's 6.6 cm anti-aircraft gun was replaced with a 37 mm (1.5 in) anti-aircraft gun of Italian manufacture; apart from that modification, the ship served in her original configuration. From 1930, she served as a barracks ship, first at Genoa and then in La Spezia. In September 1935, Venezia was drydocked at La Spezia in preparation of being laid up before being scrapped. The ship was sold for scrapping 11 March 1937 and was subsequently broken up.
