= HMS Dartmouth (1911) =

Weymouth-class light cruiser

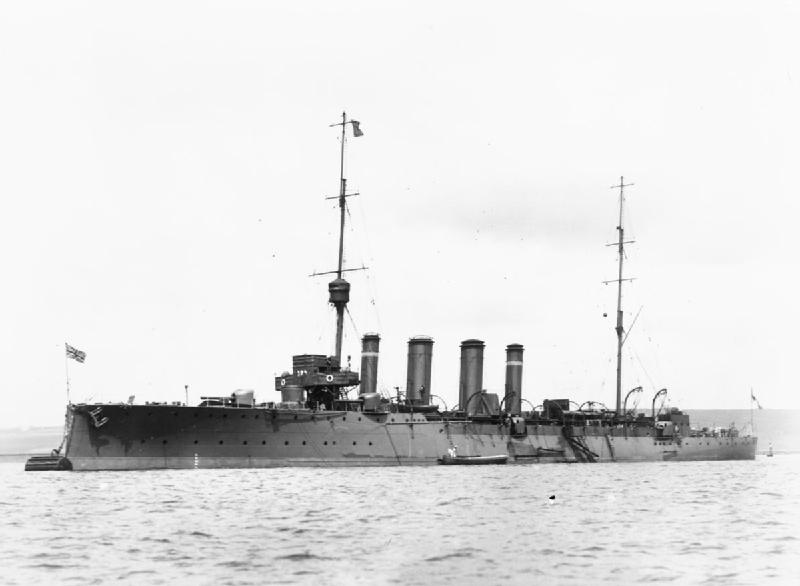

History

United Kingdom
- Name: Dartmouth
- Namesake: Dartmouth, Devon
- Builder: Vickers
- Laid down: 19 February 1910
- Launched: 14 February 1911
- Commissioned: 16 October 1911
- Fate: Sold for scrap, 13 December 1930

General characteristics (as built)
- Class & type: Town-class light cruiser
- Displacement: 5,275 long tons (5,360 t)
- Length: 430 ft (131.1 m) p/p; 453 ft (138.1 m) o/a
- Beam: 47 ft 6 in (14.5 m)
- Draught: 15 ft 6 in (4.72 m) (mean)
- Installed power: 12 × Yarrow boilers; 22,000 shp (16,000 kW)
- Propulsion: 2 × shafts; 2 × steam turbines
- Speed: 25 knots (46 km/h; 29 mph)
- Range: 5,610 nmi (10,390 km; 6,460 mi) at 10 knots (19 km/h; 12 mph)
- Complement: 475
- Armament: 8 × single 6 in (152 mm) guns; 4 × single 3 pdr (47 mm (1.9 in)) guns; 2 × 21 in (533 mm) torpedo tubes
- Armour: Deck: .75–2 in (19–51 mm); Conning tower: 4 in (102 mm)

HMS Dartmouth was a Town-class light cruiser built for the Royal Navy in the 1910s. She was one of the Weymouth sub-class of the Town class. The ship survived the First World War and was sold for scrap on 13 December 1930.

== Construction and design ==
Dartmouth was laid down by Vickers at their Barrow shipyard on 19 February 1910, one of four Town-class protected cruisers ordered under the 1909–1910 Naval Estimates. The four 1909–10 ships, also known as the Weymouth class, were an improved version of five similar Town-class ships laid down under the 1908–1909 Estimates, known as the Bristol class, with a heavier main armament of eight 6 inch (152 mm) Mk XI guns, compared with the two 6 inch and ten 4 inch of the earlier ships. The ships had a secondary armament of four Vickers 3-pounder (47 mm) guns, with two submerged 21 inch (533 mm) torpedo tubes mounted on the ships' beams.

Dartmouth was 453 feet (138.07 m) long overall, with a beam of 48 feet 6 inches (14.78 m) and a draught of 15 feet 6 inches (4.72 m). She displaced 5,250 long tons (5,330 t) normal and 5,800 long tons (5,900 t) deep load. Machinery was the same as in the Bristol class, with 12 Yarrow boilers feeding Parsons steam turbines, driving four shafts. The turbines were laid out in three separate engine rooms, with high pressure turbines, located in wing compartments, driving the outer shafts and low pressure turbines in a central compartment. The engines were rated at 22,000 shaft horsepower (16,000 kW), giving a design speed of 25 knots (46 km/h; 29 mph). The ship had four funnels.

Dartmouth was launched on 14 February 1911, (Note: Preston and Dittmar and Colledge state a launch date of 14 December 1910, while Lyon says Dartmouth was launched on 13 February.) reaching a speed of 25.9 knots (48.0 km/h; 29.8 mph) during sea trials. She was completed in October 1911, at a cost of £320,406.

== Service history ==
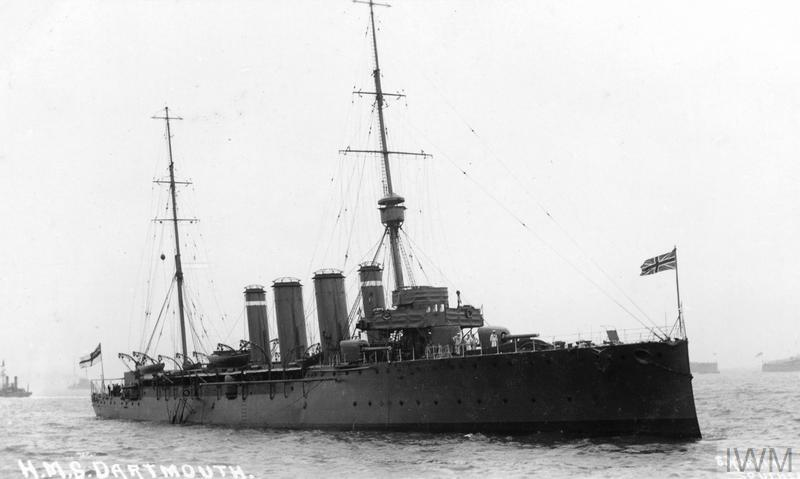
Cruiser HMS Dartmouth

On commissioning, Dartmouth joined the Atlantic Fleet, being attached to the Third Battle Squadron from 1912 to 1913. After a 1913 cruise to the Mediterranean Sea, she was briefly attached to the Second Light Cruiser Squadron at Devonport to participate in the 1913 Naval Manoeuvres before leaving to join the East Indies Squadron of the Eastern Fleet.

On the outbreak of the First World War, Dartmouth was docked at Bombay, but was soon returned to sea, escorting a troop convoy from Karachi to Mombasa in Kenya and then taking part in the search for the German cruiser Königsberg. On 9 October that year she captured the German tug Adjutant in the Mozambique Channel. On 30 October, the cruiser HMS Chatham spotted Königsberg moored up the Rufiji delta, and on 2 November, Dartmouth attempted to engage Königsberg or the supporting steamer Somali but the German ships were too far upstream to be successfully engaged. On 10 November, the British scuttled the collier Newbridge in the Rufiji River as a blockship to prevent Königsberg from escaping, and on 11 November, Dartmouth left to reinforce the Cape of Good Hope Station in the aftermath of the Battle of Coronel. In January 1915, Dartmouth was reassigned to the 2nd Light Cruiser Squadron of the Grand Fleet but was detached to operate in the South Atlantic in the search for the commerce raider SMS Karlsruhe. (Unknown to the Royal Navy, Karlsruhe had already been lost, sunk by an internal explosion on 4 November 1914 near Barbados.)

In February 1915, Dartmouth was sent to join the forces operating off the Dardanelles in support of the Gallipoli Campaign. On 15 March she suffered a boiler explosion that killed 15 of her crew. Despite this damage, Dartmouth continued operations, and on 18 March Dartmouth patrolled off the West coast of the Gallipoli peninsula while a final attempt was made by the battleships of the fleet to force the straits during daylight. The attack was a failure, with three battleships sunk by mines, and several more ships heavily damages by mines or by Turkish gunfire. Dartmouth escorted the battlecruiser HMS Inflexible, badly damaged by striking a mine, to Tenedos. On 25 April, the Allies landed troops at Anzac Cove and Cape Helles on the Gallipoli peninsula, with Dartmouth taking part in a diversionary simulated landing further north, at Bulair.

In May 1915, Dartmouth was reassigned to the 8th Light Cruiser Squadron at Brindisi, supporting Italian forces in the Adriatic Sea. Dartmouth's speed had been reduced to 21 knots (39 km/h; 24 mph) by the boiler explosion in March, and further boiler problems had reduced her speed to 16 knots (30 km/h; 18 mph) by June 1915. As a result, on 30 June Dartmouth paid off at Malta for a refit, not recommissioning until 1 October. On 28 December 1915, an Austrian force of cruisers and destroyers raided the port of Durazzo in Albania, and Dartmouth, together with the Italian cruiser Quarto and several French destroyers, set off to intercept the returning Austrian force, later being joined by Dartmouth's sister ship Weymouth and the Italian cruiser Nino Bixio. In the resulting Battle off Durazzo, Dartmouth scored several hits on the Austrian cruiser SMS Helgoland.

On 14/15 May 1917, Dartmouth took part in the Battle of the Otranto Straits. A force of three Austro-Hungarian cruisers (Helgoland, Novara and Saida carried out an attack on the drifters of the Otranto Barrage, while two destroyers Csepel and Warasdiner carried out a diversionary attack against merchant shipping off Albania. The two destroyers attacked an Italian convoy at about 03:30 Central European Time (CET), sinking the Italian destroyer Borea and the freighter Carrocio, with the main cruiser attack on the drifter line starting at about 04:20 CET, with 14 of the lightly armed drifters sunk and four more damaged. Dartmouth, with the Italian Admiral Alfredo Acton, the overall commander of the Allied naval response aboard, left Brindisi at 05:36 CET in company with the Italian destroyers Simone Schiaffino and Giovanni Acerbi, and was joined in the pursuit of the Austro-Hungarian cruisers by the Italian scout Aquila and the British cruiser Bristol. Dartmouth was hit several times by shellfire from Austro-Hungarian cruisers which she was pursuing, and had to heave to. Returning to port she was hit by a torpedo from the German submarine UC-25 and began sinking. The order to abandon ship was given but a small team volunteered to remain on board manning the pumps while the Dartmouth was towed to port.

Dartmouth was drydocked and repaired and went on to survive the war, following which she was assigned to the America and West Indies Station, based at the Royal Naval Dockyard, on Ireland Island in the Imperial fortress colony of Bermuda, where she was damaged by a hurricane in 1922, while simultaneously fighting a fire.

She was sold for scrapping on 13 December 1930 to Alloa Ship Breaking Company of Rosyth.

== Bibliography ==
- "Action of May 15, 1917 in the Adriatic; and the Torpedoing of the Dartmouth" (PDF). The Naval Review. 7 (3): 379–384. 1919. Archived from the original (PDF) on 1 April 2015.
- Brown, David K. (2010). The Grand Fleet: Warship Design and Development 1906–1922. Seaforth Publishing. ISBN 978-1-84832-085-7.
- Colledge, J. J.; Warlow, Ben & Bush, Steve (2020). Ships of the Royal Navy: The Complete Record of all Fighting Ships of the Royal Navy from the 15th Century to the Present (5th revised and updated ed.). Seaforth Publishing. ISBN 978-1-5267-9327-0.
- Corbett, Julian. Naval Operations to the Battle of the Falklands. History of the Great War: Based on Official Documents. Vol. I (2nd ed.). Imperial War Museum and Battery Press. ISBN 0-89839-256-X.
- Corbett, Julian (1997) [1929]. Naval Operations. History of the Great War: Based on Official Documents. Vol. II (Second ed.). Imperial War Museum in association with the Battery Press. ISBN 1-870423-74-7.
- Dittmar, F. J.; Colledge, J. J. (1972). British Warships 1914–1919. Ian Allan. ISBN 0-7110-0380-7.
- Friedman, Norman (2010). British Cruisers: Two World Wars and After. Naval Institute Press. ISBN 978-1-59114-078-8.
- Halpern, Paul G. (1987). The Naval War in the Mediterranean 1914–1918. Naval Institute Press. ISBN 0-87021-448-9.
- Halpern, Paul G. (2004). The Battle of the Otranto Straits: Controlling the Gateway to the Adriatic in WWI. Indiana University Press. ISBN 0-253-34379-8.
- "H.M. Cruiser Dartmouth" (PDF). The Engineer. Vol. 111. 17 February 1911. p. 174.
- Hythe, Thomas, ed. (1912). The Naval Annual. J. Griffin & Co.
- Monograph No. 21: The Mediterranean 1914–1915 (PDF). Naval Staff Monographs (Historical). Vol. VIII. The Naval Staff, Training and Staff Duties Division. 1923.
- "Narrative of Proceedings of H.M.S. Chatham" (PDF). The Naval Review. 3 (3): 471–487. 1915. Archived from the original (PDF) on 6 October 2014.
- Lyon, David (1977). "The First Town Class 1908–31: Part 2". Warship. 1 (2): 54–61. ISBN 0-85177-132-7.
- Lyon, David (1977). "The First Town Class 1908–31: Part 3". Warship. 1 (3): 46–51. ISBN 0-85177-132-7.
- Massie, Robert K. (2007). Castles of Steel: Britain, Germany and the Winning of the Great War at Sea. Vintage Books. ISBN 978-0-099-52378-9.
- Newbolt, Henry (1996) [1931]. Naval Operations. History of the Great War Based on Official Documents. Vol. V. Battery Press. ISBN 0-89839-255-1.
- Preston, Antony (1985). "Great Britain and Empire Forces". In Gray, Randal (ed.). Conway's All the World's Fighting Ships 1906–1921. Naval Institute Press. pp. 1–104. ISBN 0-85177-245-5.
