= SMS Helgoland (1912) =

Scout cruiser of the Austro-Hungarian Navy

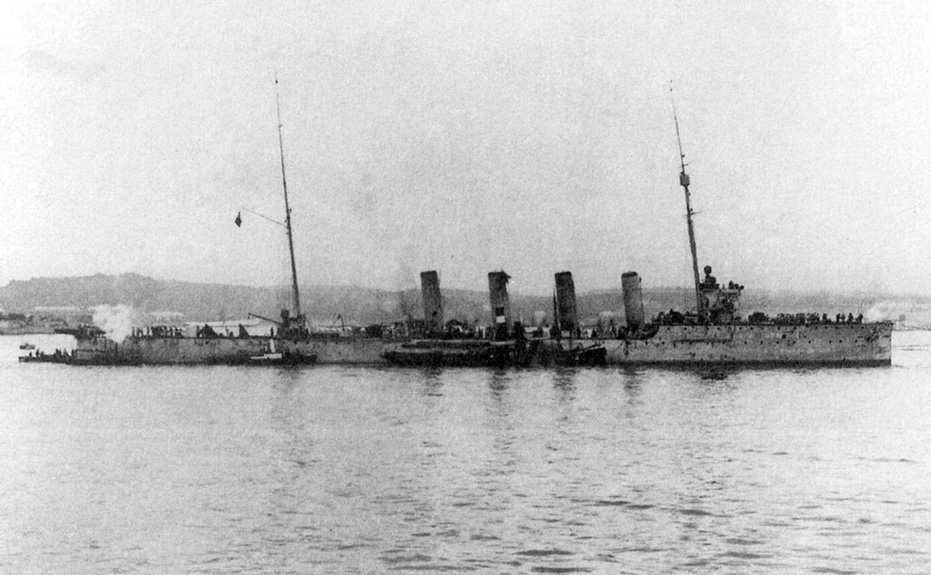
- SMS Helgoland

History

Austria-Hungary
- Name: SMS Helgoland
- Namesake: Battle of Heligoland (1864)
- Builder: Ganz-Danubius, Fiume, Kingdom of Hungary, Austro-Hungarian Empire
- Laid down: 28 October 1911
- Launched: 23 November 1912
- Completed: 5 September 1914
- Fate: Ceded to Italy, 19 September 1920

Italy
- Name: Brindisi
- Namesake: Brindisi, Italy
- Acquired: 19 September 1920
- Reclassified: as depot ship, 26 November 1929
- Stricken: 11 March 1937
- Fate: Scrapped, 1937

General characteristics (as built)
- Class & type: Novara-class scout cruiser
- Displacement: 3,500 metric tons (3,400 long tons)
- Length: 130.64 m (428 ft 7 in)
- Beam: 12.79 m (42 ft 0 in)
- Draft: 4.6 m (15 ft 1 in)
- Installed power: 25,600 shp (19,100 kW); 16 Yarrow boilers
- Propulsion: 2 shafts; 2 AEG-Curtis steam turbines
- Speed: 27 knots (50 km/h; 31 mph)
- Range: 1,600 nmi (3,000 km; 1,800 mi) at 24 knots (44 km/h; 28 mph)
- Complement: 340
- Armament: 9 × single 10 cm (3.9 in) guns; 1 × 7 cm (2.8 in) anti-aircraft gun; 1 × 47 mm (1.9 in) SFK L/44 gun; 6 x twin 53.3 cm (21.0 in) torpedo tubes
- Armor: Waterline belt: 60 mm (2.4 in); Deck: 20 mm (0.8 in)

SMS Helgoland (Note: In German, "SMS" means "Seiner Majestät Schiff" (in English: "His Majesty's Ship").) was a Novara-class scout cruiser built for the Austro-Hungarian Navy right before World War I. Helgoland participated in several raids on the ships defending the Strait of Otranto, including the Battle of the Strait of Otranto in May 1917. She was transferred to Italy in 1920 in accordance with the peace treaties ending World War I and renamed Brindisi. After modifications, the ship was assigned to the squadron responsible for the Eastern Mediterranean until 1924. She spent the next five years based in Libya and Italy before Brindisi was disarmed and turned into a depot ship in 1929. The ship was stricken from the Navy List in 1937 and later broken up.

== Design and description ==
The ship measured 130.64 meters (428 ft 7 in) overall, with a beam of 12.79 meters (42 ft 0 in). Helgoland had a mean draft of 4.6 meters (15 ft 1 in) and displaced 3,500 metric tons (3,400 long tons) at normal load. At deep load, she displaced 4,017 metric tons (3,954 long tons). Her propulsion system consisted of two sets of AEG-Curtis steam turbines driving two propeller shafts. They were designed to provide 25,600 shaft horsepower (19,100 kW) and were powered by 16 Yarrow water-tube boilers. These gave the ship a top speed of 27 knots (50 km/h; 31 mph). Helgoland carried about 710 metric tons (700 long tons) of coal that gave her a range of approximately 1,600 nautical miles (3,000 km; 1,800 mi) at 24 knots (44 km/h; 28 mph). The ship had a crew of 340 officers and men.

Helgoland was armed with nine 50-caliber 10 cm (3.9 in) guns in single pedestal mounts. Three were placed forward on the forecastle, four were located amidships, two on either side, and two were side by side on the quarterdeck. A Škoda 7 cm (2.8 in)/50 K10 anti-aircraft gun and six 53.3 cm (21.0 in) torpedo tubes in twin mounts were added in 1917. The navy planned to remove the guns on the forecastle and quarterdeck and replace them with 15-centimeter (5.9 in) guns fore and aft, but nothing was done before the end of the war.

The ship was protected by a waterline armored belt that was 60 mm (2.4 in) thick amidships. The conning tower had 60 mm thick sides, and the deck was 20 mm (0.79 in) thick.

== Service history ==
Helgoland was laid down at the Ganz-Danubius shipyard in Fiume on 28 October 1911 and was launched on 23 November 1912. The ship was completed on 5 September 1914, a month after the start of World War I.

One day after Italy declared war on Austria-Hungary on 23 May 1915, Helgoland and two destroyers engaged and sank the Italian destroyer Turbine. On 17 August 1915, Helgoland, her sister ship Saida, and four destroyers bombarded Italian forces on the island of Pelagosa which had recently been occupied by the Italians.

In late 1915, the Austro-Hungarian Navy began a series of raids against the merchant ships supplying Allied forces in Serbia and Montenegro. On the night of 22/23 November 1915, Helgoland, Saida, and the 1st Torpedo Division raided the Albanian coast and sank a pair of Italian transports carrying flour. To facilitate these raids, Helgoland, her sister Novara, six modern Tátra-class destroyers, six 250t-class T-group torpedo boats and an oiler were transferred to Cattaro to facilitate further raids on 29 November. Helgoland, together with five destroyers, participated in another of these raids at the end of December. On the night of 28/29 December 1915, while making her sortie, Helgoland rammed and sank the French submarine Monge between Brindisi and the Albanian port of Durazzo. Helgoland and the destroyers attacked shipping in Durazzo the following morning. Two of the destroyers struck mines after sinking several ships in the port and had to be abandoned. The Austro-Hungarians managed to evade the Allied pursuit only when darkness fell. On the night of 31 May/1 June 1916, the ship covered a raid by two destroyers and three torpedo boats on the drifters defending the Strait of Otranto against submarines trying to exit the Adriatic Sea, sinking one.

=== Battle of the Strait of Otranto ===
Erich Heyssler assumed command of Helgoland in April 1917 and Miklós Horthy planned another raid on the drifters using a force composed of the three Novara-class cruisers. The three cruisers were to attack separately while two destroyers made a diversionary attack on the drifters near the Albanian coast. On the night of 14 May, the ships departed port and managed to pass through the line of drifters in the darkness without being identified. As the sounds from the diversionary attack were heard, the drifters released their nets and began to head towards Otranto. Helgoland turned around and attacked the westernmost group of drifters as dawn began on the morning of 15 May. Between the three cruisers, they sank 14 drifters and badly damaged an additional four. The skipper of the drifter Gowan Lea, Joseph Watt, refused to surrender and abandon ship when demanded by Helgoland, despite the cruiser only being 100 yards (91 m) away. Watt's crew only managed to fire one shot before their single 57 mm (2.2 in) six-pounder gun was disabled. Watt's refusal to surrender in the face of overwhelming odds was recognized after the battle by the award of the Victoria Cross.

Helgoland did not linger to ensure that Gowan Lea was sunk, but proceeded to attack other drifters. She did, however, pause briefly to rescue 18 survivors from other drifters before turning for home. The Austro-Hungarian ships were first contacted during their retreat by a group of three French destroyers led by a small Italian scout cruiser, Carlo Mirabello, but the heavier guns of the Austro-Hungarian ships dissuaded the Allied commander from closing the range. They were intercepted shortly afterward by a stronger group of two British protected cruisers, Bristol and Dartmouth, escorted by four Italian destroyers. Dartmouth opened fire with her 6-inch (152 mm) guns at a range of 10,600 yards (9,700 m) and Horthy ordered his ships to make smoke several minutes later. This nearly caused the three Austro-Hungarian cruisers to collide in the dense smoke, but covered them against the fire from the British ships as they closed the range. When they emerged, the Austro-Hungarian ships were only about 4,900 yards (4,500 m) from the British, a range much more suitable for the smaller Austro-Hungarian guns.

The three cruisers were gradually drawing away from their pursuers when Novara, leading the Austro-Hungarian ships, was hit several times; most critically in the engine room that knocked out half her boilers. Helgoland was also hit five times, but not seriously, aside from one gun disabled. One crewman had been killed and 16 were wounded. The British ships turned away, around the time that Novara had to extinguish her remaining boilers and went dead in the water, upon learning that more Austro-Hungarian ships were approaching. Saida was preparing to take Novara under tow when several Italian destroyers attacked in succession. The weight of fire from the three cruisers prevented them from closing to torpedo range and they scored no hits. The Allied ship returned to Brindisi and the Austro-Hungarians slowly proceeded back to base. Helgoland had fired 1052 shells from her 10 cm guns. Heyssler received the Order of Leopold with crossed swords in recognition of his leadership during the battle.

Helgoland and six destroyers attempted to duplicate the success of the earlier raid on 18–19 October 1917, but they were spotted by Italian aircraft and turned back in the face of substantial Allied reinforcements alerted by the aircraft. She was caught under the guns of several mutinous armored cruisers during the Cattaro Mutiny in February 1918, but managed to escape without damage. The ship was tasked to participate in a major attack on the Allied ships defending the Strait of Otranto on 11 June, but it was called off after the dreadnought SMS Szent István was sunk by Italian motor torpedo boats en route to the rendezvous for the operation. Following the Armistice of Villa Giusti between Italy and Austria-Hungary on 3 November, the entire Austro-Hungarian fleet was transferred to the newly formed Kingdom of Serbs, Croats, and Slovenes, although most of these ships were soon transferred to the major Entente powers.

=== Italian service ===
Italy received Helgoland from Austria-Hungary on 19 September 1920 as part of the Treaty of Saint-Germain-en-Laye that ended the country's participation in World War I. Renamed Brindisi and anchored at Bizerte, Tunisia, when the transfer was made, the ship was rated as an esploratore (scout cruiser) by Italy, and reached La Spezia on 26 October where she was assigned to the Scouting Group (Gruppo Esploratori). The ship was modified to suit the Italians at La Spezia from 6 April to 16 June 1921 before she entered service. She became the flagship of Rear Admiral Massimiliano Lovatelli, commander of the Light Squadron, upon recommissioning. Brindisi sailed for Istanbul on 3 July, visiting a number of ports in Italy, Greece, and Turkey en route. She relieved the armored cruiser San Giorgio as flagship of the Eastern Squadron upon her arrival on 16 July. The ship was replaced as flagship on 6 October and remained assigned to the Eastern Squadron until she returned to Italy on 7 January 1924.

Brindisi hosted King Victor Emmanuel III aboard during the ceremonies that transferred Fiume to Italian control in accordance with the Treaty of Rome in February–March 1924. The ship was then transferred to Libya, where she spent the next year. Brindisi returned to Italy the following year and was briefly assigned to the Scout Squadron on 1 April 1926 before she was placed in reserve on 26 July. The ship was reactivated on 1 June 1927 when she was assigned as the flagship of the 1st Destroyer Squadron under the command of Rear Admiral Enrico Cuturi. Six months later, she was relieved as flagship and was transferred to the Special Squadron where she became flagship of Rear Admiral Antonio Foschini on 6 June 1928. In May–June 1929, Brindisi made a cruise in the Eastern Mediterranean where she visited ports in Greece and the Dodecanese Islands. Rear Admiral Salvatore Denti relieved Foschini on 15 October and the ship was disarmed on 26 November. She was used as a depot ship at Ancona, Pula, and Trieste until she was stricken from the Navy List on 11 March 1937.
