= HMS Bristol (1910) =

1910 light cruiser of the Royal Navy

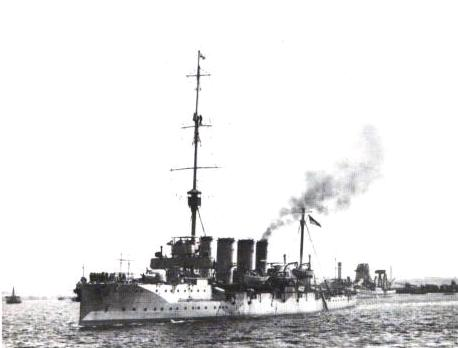
- Bristol underway

History

United Kingdom
- Name: Bristol
- Namesake: Bristol
- Builder: John Brown & Company, Clydebank
- Laid down: 23 March 1909
- Launched: 23 February 1910
- Commissioned: December 1910
- Decommissioned: 30 May 1919
- Fate: Sold for scrap, 9 May 1921

General characteristics (as built)
- Class & type: Town-class light cruiser
- Displacement: 4,800 long tons (4,900 t)
- Length: 430 ft (131.1 m) p/p; 453 ft (138.1 m) o/a
- Beam: 47 ft (14.3 m)
- Draught: 15 ft 3 in (4.65 m) (mean)
- Installed power: 12 × Yarrow boilers; 22,000 shp (16,000 kW)
- Propulsion: 2 × shafts; 2 × steam turbines
- Speed: 25 knots (46 km/h; 29 mph)
- Range: 5,830 nmi (10,800 km; 6,710 mi) at 10 knots (19 km/h; 12 mph)
- Complement: 410
- Armament: 2 × single 6 in (152 mm) guns; 10 × single 4 in (102 mm) guns; 4 × single 3 pdr (47 mm (1.9 in)) guns; 2 × 18 in (450 mm) torpedo tubes
- Armour: Deck: .75–2 in (19–51 mm); Conning tower: 6 in (150 mm)

HMS Bristol was a Town-class light cruiser built for the Royal Navy in the first decade of the 20th century. She was the lead ship of the five in her sub-class and was completed in late 1910. The ship spent part of her early career in reserve before she was transferred to the 4th Cruiser Squadron (4th CS) of the North America and West Indies Station in mid-1914. Bristol was briefly deployed to Mexico during the Mexican Revolution to protect British interests there.

The ship was tasked to protect Allied shipping off the coasts of North and South America from German commerce raiders after World War I began in August 1914. She briefly encountered a German light cruiser in the West Indies a few days after the war began, but the battle was inconclusive. A few months later, Bristol played a minor role in the Battle of the Falkland Islands in December by sinking some of the colliers belonging to the German East Asia Squadron. After a lengthy refit in mid-1915, the ship was transferred to the Adriatic Force, where she participated in the Battle of the Strait of Otranto in 1917. Bristol returned to her former task of patrolling off the east coast of South America, after a brief time escorting convoys off West Africa in early 1918, and continued to do so after the end of the war. She was placed in reserve in mid-1919, listed for sale in 1920 and was sold for scrap in 1921.

== Design and description ==
The Bristol sub-class (Note: Sometimes known as the Glasgow class.) was intended for a variety of roles including both trade protection and duties with the fleet. They were 453 feet (138.1 m) long overall, with a beam of 47 feet (14.3 m) and a draught of 15 feet 6 inches (4.7 m). Displacement was 4,800 long tons (4,900 t) normal and 5,300 long tons (5,400 t) at full load. Twelve Yarrow boilers fed Bristol's Brown-Curtis steam turbines, driving two propeller shafts, that were rated at 22,000 shaft horsepower (16,000 kW) for a design speed of 25 knots (46 km/h; 29 mph). The ship reached 27 knots (50 km/h; 31 mph) during her sea trials from 28,711 shp (21,410 kW). The ship's experimental two-shaft layout was very successful, giving greater efficiency, especially at lower speeds, than the four-shaft arrangement of her sister ships. The boilers used both fuel oil and coal, with 1,353 long tons (1,375 t) of coal and 256 long tons (260 t) tons of oil carried, which gave a range of 5,830 nautical miles (10,800 km; 6,710 mi) at 10 knots (19 km/h; 12 mph). In 1912 Bristol became the first warship to run on superheated steam from her twelve boilers, enabling even greater speeds as well as fuel economies.

The main armament of the Bristol class was two BL 6-inch (152 mm) Mk XI guns that were mounted on the centreline fore and aft of the superstructure and ten BL 4-inch Mk VII guns in waist mountings. All these guns were fitted with gun shields. Four Vickers 3-pounder (47 mm) saluting guns were fitted, while two submerged 18-inch (450 mm) torpedo tubes were fitted. This armament was considered rather too light for ships of this size, while the waist guns were subject to immersion in a high sea, making them difficult to work.

The Bristols were considered protected cruisers, with an armoured deck providing protection for the ships' vitals. The armoured deck was 2 inches (51 mm) thick over the magazines and machinery, 1 inch (25 mm) over the steering gear and 3/4 inch (19 mm) elsewhere. The conning tower was protected by 6 inches (152 mm) of armour, with the gun shields having 3 inches (76 mm) armour, as did the ammunition hoists. As the protective deck was at waterline, the ships were given a large metacentric height so that they would remain stable in the event of flooding above the armoured deck. This, however, resulted in the ships rolling badly making them poor gun platforms. One problem with the armour of the Bristols which was shared with the other Town-class ships was the sizeable gap between the bottom of the gun shields and the deck, which allowed shell splinters to pass through the gap, giving large numbers of leg injuries in the ships' gun crews.

== Construction and career ==
Bristol, the fifth ship of her name to serve in the Royal Navy, was named after the eponymous city. She was laid down on 23 March 1909 at John Brown & Company's Clydebank shipyard, launched on 23 February 1910 and completed on 17 December 1910. As of 18 February 1913, the ship was assigned to the 5th Battle Squadron of the reserve Second Fleet at Devonport. On 1 July, Bristol was transferred to the 2nd Light Cruiser Squadron of the Second Fleet. Almost six months later, some of her crewmen helped to put out a fire in Portsmouth Dockyard on 20 December; two men were killed fighting the fire.

On 18 May 1914, the ship was reassigned to the 4th CS of the North America and West Indies Station and sailed that day to join the squadron. She arrived at Jamaica on the 31st and was ordered to depart for Mexico after recoaling to protect British interests during the ongoing Mexican Revolution. Bristol spent most of June in Tampico, but sailed for Veracruz at the end of the month where Rear-Admiral Christopher Craddock, the squadron commander, inspected the ship and her crew on 1 July. The ship departed for Puerto México (present day Coatzacoalcos) on the 15th and served as temporary refuge for members of the family of ex-president Victoriano Huerta for a few days as they were fleeing the country at the time of the United States occupation of Veracruz. Bristol sailed for Jamaica on the 31st as tensions with Germany rose.

=== World War I ===
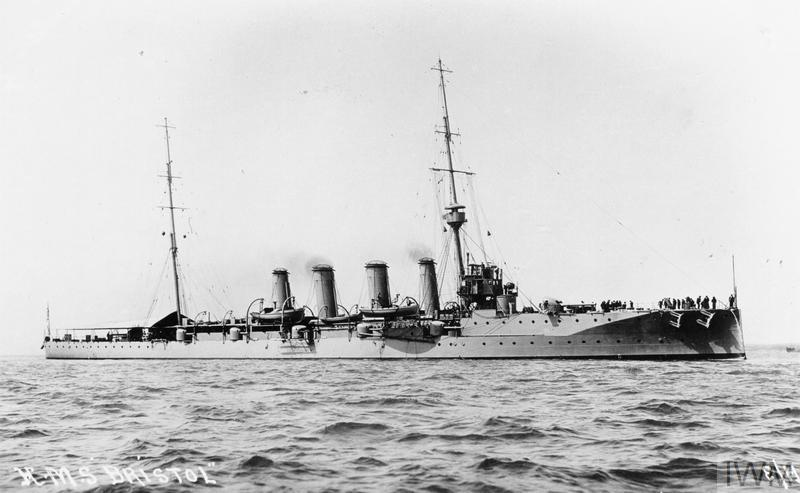
Cruiser HMS Bristol

The 4th Cruiser Squadron (formerly the North America and West Indies Station), with its main base the Royal Naval Dockyard at Bermuda, was tasked to protect Allied merchant shipping from commerce raiders in the Caribbean and along the East Coast of North America and Craddock dispersed his ships shortly before the war began on 4 August 1914 in a futile search for the two German warships known to be in the area. In the early evening of 6 August, Bristol spotted the German light cruiser Karlsruhe, but failed to inflict any significant damage before engine problems allowed the German ship to disengage behind her own smoke. Later in the month, Bristol began patrolling off the northern coast of Brazil in an unsuccessful attempt to find the German ships. The ship was detached to continue to patrol the Brazilian coast and did not join Craddock's ships as they searched for the East Asia Squadron off the Chilean coast in October.

In mid-October, Bristol, together with the armoured cruiser Cornwall and two armed merchant cruisers was assigned to a new squadron commanded by Rear Admiral Archibald Stoddart that was tasked to patrol the South American coast north of Montevideo, Uruguay. After Craddock's squadron was destroyed in the Battle of Coronel on 1 November, the ship rendezvoused at the Abrolhos Archipelago on 26 November with the reinforcements commanded by Vice-Admiral Doveton Sturdee. The ships then proceeded to the Falkland Islands where they arrived on 7 December.

==== Battle of the Falklands ====
Upon arrival at Port Stanley on 7 December, Sturdee gave permission for Bristol to put out her fires to clean her boilers and repair both engines. He planned to recoal the entire squadron the following day from the two available colliers and to begin the search for the East Asia Squadron the day after. Vice-Admiral Maximilian von Spee, commander of the German squadron, had other plans and intended to destroy the radio station at Port Stanley on the morning of 8 December. The appearance of two German ships at 07:30 caught Sturdee's ships by surprise although they were driven off by 12-inch (305 mm) shells fired by the predreadnought battleship Canopus when they came within range around 09:20. This gave time for Bristol to reassemble her engines and raise steam. As the ship was leaving harbour around 10:45, she received reports of German ships about 30 miles (48 km) south and Sturdee ordered her to intercept and destroy them, together with the armed merchant cruiser SS Macedonia. The British ships were able to capture two of the three German colliers and sank them after taking off their crews.

The light cruiser SMS Dresden was the only German ship able to disengage from the battle and Sturdee ordered Bristol to Puntas Arenas, Chile, after the ship was reported coaling there on 13 December. She arrived there the next day, but Dresden had left the night before. Bristol spent the next several months hunting for the German cruiser along the Argentinian and Chilean coasts and in the innumerable bays and inlets of Tierra del Fuego. During this time, she struck a shoal and seriously damaged her rudder on 22 February 1915. In late April, the ship began patrolling off the Brazilian coast. Bristol began a major refit at Gibraltar on 27 May that lasted until 5 August. Upon its completion, she was transferred to the British Adriatic Force to help contain the Austro-Hungarian Fleet and defend the Otranto Barrage. She then spent most of the next several months patrolling the lower reaches of the Adriatic Sea and the Strait of Otranto. On 3 October, her crew was inspected by Rear-Admiral Cecil Thursby. On 26 November, Bristol sailed for Gibraltar en route to a refit at William Beardmore and Company's shipyard in Dalmuir that began on 17 December.

==== Battle of the Strait of Otranto ====
On the early morning of 15 May 1917, the Austro-Hungarians made their most serious attack of the war on the naval drifters controlling the barrage. Bristol was the "ready ship" at Brindisi and was at a half-hour's notice for sea; she departed at 04:50, escorted by two Italian destroyers, in an attempt to intercept the three Austrian light cruisers that had conducted the attack. Contrammiraglio (Rear-Admiral) Alfredo Acton, commander of the ships at Brindisi, ordered that her speed be limited to 20 knots (37 km/h; 23 mph) to prevent her from getting too far ahead of the other ships now raising steam. One of these was Bristol's half-sister Dartmouth, which departed at 05:36, also escorted by a pair of Italian destroyers. The Dartmouth group overtook Bristol and her consorts by 07:12 and were joined by the Italian scout cruiser Aquila around 07:40. Acton deployed his cruisers in line abreast with Aquila leading them and the destroyers guarding the flanks. Bristol's bottom was foul, however, and limited the group to a speed of 24 knots (44 km/h; 28 mph).

Five minutes later, the Allied ships spotted clouds of smoke on the horizon and Acton ordered the Italian ships to attack shortly afterwards while the two British cruisers turned to cut off the two Austrian destroyers. Aquila opened fire at 08:15 at long range, but inflicted no damage before she was immobilised by a hit at 08:32 that detonated inside her central boiler room and severed her main steam pipe. The Austrian ships managed to disengage before the cruisers could close the distance.

The main Austro-Hungarian force of three light cruisers trailed the leading destroyers by a considerable distance and Commander Miklós Horthy spotted the Allied force around 09:05. Acton spotted them about five minutes later and manoeuvred his ships to cover the disabled Aquila rather than crossing the Austrians' T. The British ships opened fire about 09:30, although Horthy's ships quickly laid a smoke screen and turned away through it. Both sides settled on parallel courses to the north-northwest and Bristol gradually began to fall behind and could eventually only use her bow gun at very long range before ceasing fire at 10:15. The British fire was moderately effective, but the Austrian ships concentrated their fire on Dartmouth which was hit three times, although not significantly damaged. Acton reduced his speed around 10:45 to allow Bristol to catch up. At 10:58 he ordered speed to be increased and turned two minutes later in an unsuccessful attempt to cut off the trailing Austrian cruiser. At 11:04, the British cruisers ceased fire and turned away on Acton's order, presumably to avoid encountering Austro-Hungarian reinforcements which Acton knew were en route. During the battle the British cruisers were repeatedly attacked by Austro-Hungarian aircraft, but they inflicted no significant damage or casualties.

==== Subsequent operations ====
On 1 January 1918, Bristol was briefly based at the port of Kalloni, Lesbos, before sailing to Gibraltar for a long refit. She arrived on 17 January and departed on 2 April, bound for Sierra Leone, West Africa, to begin convoy escort duties there despite being assigned to the East Coast of South America Station. On 1 May, Bristol departed Dakar, French West Africa, bound for the Brazilian coast, arriving at Rio de Janeiro on the 15th. At the end of the month, she spent a few days salvaging ammunition from the wreck of the cargo liner SS Highland Scot. The ship patrolled the coasts of Brazil and Uruguay for the rest of the war and visited Port Stanley at the end of the year where she remained until 11 January 1919. Bristol sailed for the Cape Verde Islands in late April and then to Gibraltar where she arrived on 13 May. En route, three sailors died from influenza. A few days later, she departed for the UK and arrived at Portsmouth on the 21st. Bristol was paid off on 30 May and reduced to reserve the same day. The ship was listed for disposal in May 1920 and was sold for scrap on 9 May 1921 to Thos. W. Ward of Hayle.

== Bibliography ==
- Brown, David K. (2010). The Grand Fleet: Warship Design and Development 1906–1922. Seaforth Publishing. ISBN 978-1-84832-085-7.
- Colledge, J. J.; Warlow, Ben & Bush, Steve (2020). Ships of the Royal Navy: The Complete Record of all Fighting Ships of the Royal Navy from the 15th Century to the Present (5th revised and updated ed.). Seaforth Publishing. ISBN 978-1-5267-9327-0.
- Corbett, Julian. Naval Operations to the Battle of the Falklands. History of the Great War: Based on Official Documents. Vol. I (2nd ed.). Imperial War Museum and Battery Press. ISBN 0-89839-256-X.
- Corbett, Julian (1997) [1929]. Naval Operations. History of the Great War: Based on Official Documents. Vol. II (Second ed.). Imperial War Museum in association with the Battery Press. ISBN 1-870423-74-7.
- Friedman, Norman (2010). British Cruisers: Two World Wars and After. Naval Institute Press. ISBN 978-1-59114-078-8.
- Halpern, Paul (2004). The Battle of the Otranto Straits: Controlling the Gateway to the Adriatic in World War I. Indiana University Press. ISBN 0-253-34379-8.
- Lyon, David (1977). "The First Town Class 1908–31: Part 1". Warship. 1 (1). Conway Maritime Press: 48–58. ISBN 0-85177-132-7.
- Lyon, David (1977). "The First Town Class 1908–31: Part 2". Warship. 1 (2). Conway Maritime Press: 54–61. ISBN 0-85177-132-7.
- Lyon, David (1977). "The First Town Class 1908–31: Part 3". Warship. 1 (3). Conway Maritime Press: 46–51. ISBN 0-85177-132-7.
- Newbolt, Henry (1996) [1931]. Naval Operations. History of the Great War Based on Official Documents. Vol. V. Battery Press. ISBN 0-89839-255-1.
- Massie, Robert K. (2004). Castles of Steel: Britain, Germany, and the Winning of the Great War at Sea. Jonathan Cape. ISBN 0-224-04092-8.
- "HMS BRISTOL – July 1913 to May 1919, UK home, West Indies, South America, Battle of the Falklands, Mediterranean, South American Station, Convoy escort, UK home". Royal Navy Log Books of the World War 1 Era. Naval-History.net.
- Preston, Antony (1985). "Great Britain and Empire Forces". In Gray, Randal (ed.). Conway's All the World's Fighting Ships 1906–1921. Naval Institute Press. pp. 1–104. ISBN 0-85177-245-5.
