= Armistice of Mudros =

1918 truce between Ottoman Empire and Allied powers

Mondros Mütarekesi موندروس متارکه‌نامه‌سی
- Type: Armistice
- Signed: 30 October 1918
- Location: HMS Agamemnon
- Effective: 31 October 1918
- Signatories: (Ottoman Empire) Rauf Orbay; (United Kingdom of Great Britain and Ireland) Somerset Arthur Gough-Calthorpe

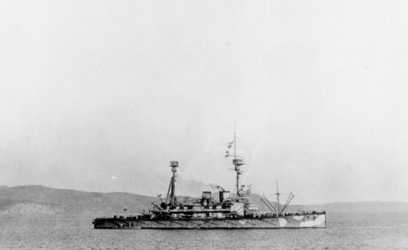
HMS Agamemnon on an earlier visit to Mudros during the Dardanelles campaign in 1915.

The Armistice of Mudros (Ottoman Turkish: موندروس متارکه‌نامه‌سی; Turkish: Mondros Mütarekesi) ended hostilities in the Middle Eastern theatre between Ottoman Empire and the Allies of World War I. It was signed on 30 October 1918 by the Ottoman Minister of Marine Affairs Rauf Orbay and British Admiral Somerset Arthur Gough-Calthorpe, Commander-in-Chief of the British Mediterranean Fleet, on board HMS Agamemnon (1906) in Moudros harbor on the Greek island of Lemnos. It took effect at noon the next day. The table it was signed on is now on board HMS Belfast in London Bridge, though it is not accessible to the public.

Among its conditions, the Ottomans surrendered their remaining garrisons outside Anatolia, and granted the Allies the right to occupy forts controlling the Straits of the Dardanelles and the Bosporus and any Ottoman territory "in case of disorder" threatening their security. The Ottoman Army (including the Ottoman Air Force and Ottoman Navy) was demobilized; and all ports, railways and other strategic points were made available for use by the Allies. In the Caucasus, the Ottomans had to retreat to within the pre-war borders between the Ottoman and the Russian Empires.

The armistice was followed by the occupation of Istanbul and the subsequent partitioning of the Ottoman Empire. The Treaty of Sèvres (10 August 1920), which was signed in the aftermath of World War I, imposed harsh terms on the Ottoman Empire, but it was never ratified by the Ottoman Parliament in Istanbul. The Ottoman Parliament was officially disbanded by the Allies on 11 April 1920 due to the overwhelming opposition of the Ottoman MPs to the provisions discussed in Sèvres. This was followed by the Turkish War of Independence which continued until 1923. The Grand National Assembly of Turkey, established in Ankara on 23 April 1920 by Mustafa Kemal Pasha and his followers (including former MPs of the closed Ottoman Parliament), became the new de facto government of Turkey. The Armistice of Mudros was superseded by the Treaty of Lausanne, signed on 24 July 1923, following the Turkish victory in the War of Independence.

== Background ==
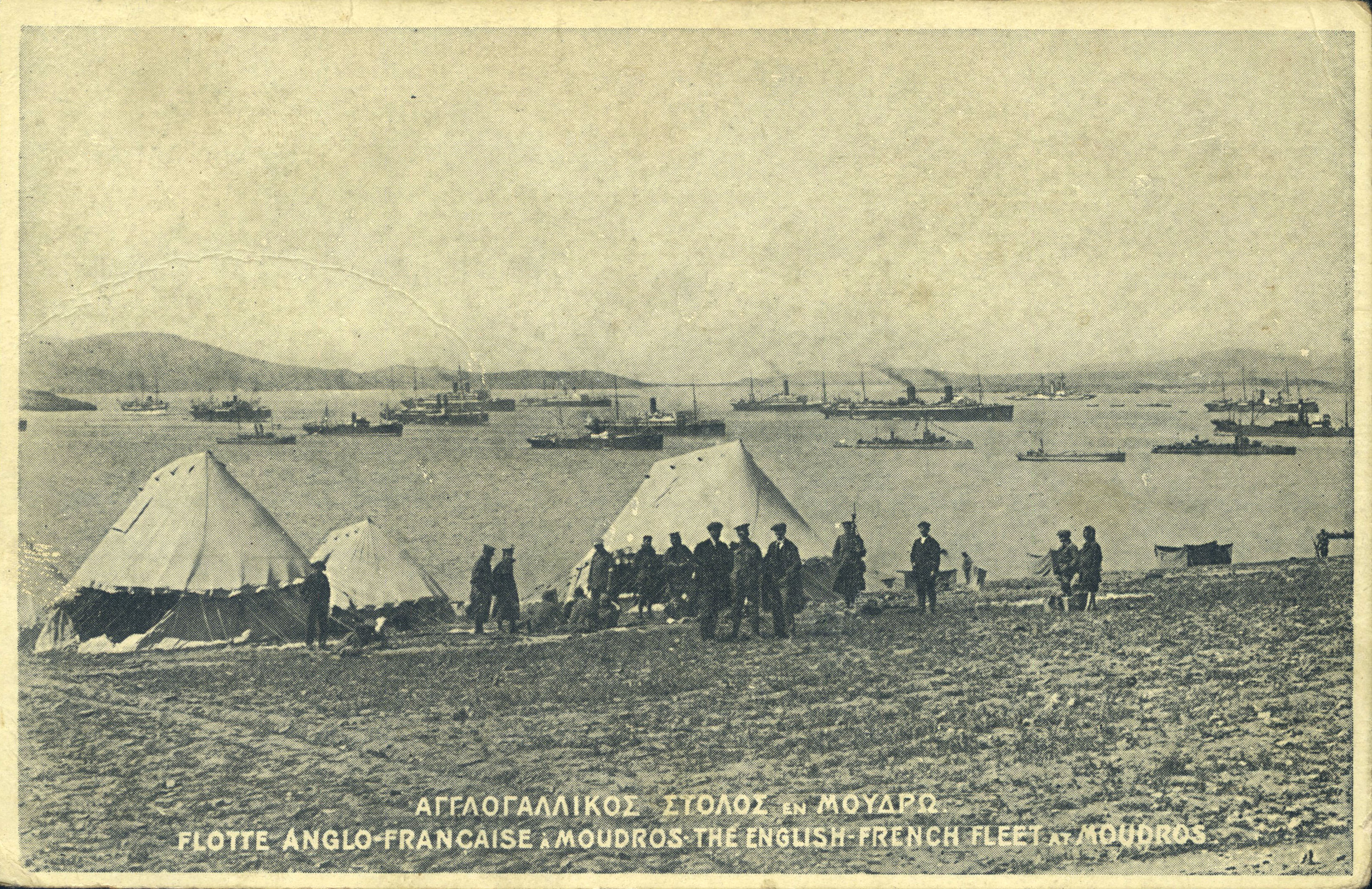
The English-French fleet at the bay of Moudros

World War I took a chaotic turn in 1918 for the Ottoman Empire. With Yudenich's Russian Caucasus Army deserting after the collapse of the Russian Empire, the Ottomans regained ground in Armenia and even pushed into formerly Russian-controlled Caucasus with, at first, Vehip Pasha's Ottoman 3rd Army and, later beginning in June 1918, with Nuri Pasha's Army of Islam which excluded German officers and men. The Caucasus Campaign put the Ottomans at odds with their ally, Germany, which had been hoping to purchase Caucasus oil from the Bolshevik government in Moscow, (Note: The Bolsheviks had support only in Petrograd and Moscow in 1917 and 1918. After allowing both Trotsky and Lenin to return to Russia by train from Switzerland and lead the October Revolution, Germany considered the Bolshevik government a puppet state under its power. After the signing of the Treaty of Brest-Litovsk, most Russians disliked the terms of the Bolshevik signed treaty and believed that the Bolsheviks were a puppet under German interests, too.) while the Ottomans wanted to establish their eastern borders. (Note: Under the terms of the Treaty of Brest-Litovsk, the Trabzon peace conference convened but failed to define the borders between the Ottoman Empire and the Transcaucasian Democratic Federative Republic. This led to the recognition that a state of war exists between Tiflis and Constantinople in April 1918.) The Ottoman armies advanced far into Caucasus, gathering supporters as far away as Tashkent, on the eastern side of the Caspian Sea. Additionally, with the Bolsheviks in power in Moscow, chaos spread in Persia, as the Russo-British favoring government of Ahmad Shah Qajar lost authority outside of the capital. In contrast, in Syria, the Ottomans were steadily pushed back by British forces, culminating in the fall of Damascus in October 1918. Hopes were initially high for the Ottomans that their losses in Syria might be compensated with successes in the Caucasus. Enver Pasha, one of the most influential members of the Ottoman government, maintained an optimistic stance, hid information that made the Ottoman position appear weak, and led most of the Ottoman elite to believe that the war was still winnable.

Developments in Southeast Europe quashed the Ottoman government's hopes. The Macedonian front, also known as the Salonika campaign, had been largely stable since 1916. In September 1918 the Allied forces (under the command of Louis Franchet d'Espèrey) mounted a sudden offensive which proved quite successful. The Bulgarian army was defeated, and Bulgaria was forced to sue for peace in the Armistice of Salonica. That undermined both the German and Ottoman cause simultaneously, as the Germans had no troops to spare to defend Austria-Hungary from the newly formed vulnerability in Southeastern Europe after the losses it had suffered in France, and the Ottomans suddenly faced having to defend Constantinople against an overland European siege without help from the Bulgarians.

Grand Vizier Talaat Pasha visited Berlin, Germany, and Sofia, Bulgaria in September 1918. He came away with the understanding that the war was no longer winnable. With Germany likely seeking a separate peace, the Ottomans would be forced to do so as well. Talaat convinced the other members of the ruling party that they must resign, as the Allies would impose far harsher terms if they thought the people who started the war were still in power. He also sought out the United States to see if he could surrender to them and gain the benefits of the Fourteen Points despite the Ottoman Empire and the United States not being at war; however, the Americans never responded, as they were waiting on British advice as to how to respond that never came. On 13 October Talaat and the rest of his ministry resigned. Ahmed Izzet Pasha replaced Talaat as Grand Vizier. Two days after taking office he sent the captured British General Charles Vere Ferrers Townshend to the Allies to seek terms on an armistice.

== Negotiations ==
The British cabinet received word of the offer and were eager to negotiate a deal. The standing terms of the alliance were that the first member that was approached for an armistice should conduct the negotiations; the British government interpreted that to mean that Britain conduct the negotiations alone. The motives for this are not entirely clear, whether it was the sincere British interpretation of the alliance terms, fears that the French would insist on overly harsh demands and foil a treaty, or a desire to cut the French out of territorial "spoils" promised to them in the Sykes–Picot Agreement. Townshend also indicated that the Ottomans preferred to deal with the British; he did not know about the American contact or that Talaat had sent an emissary to the French as well but that emissary had been slower to respond back. The British cabinet empowered Admiral Calthorpe to conduct the negotiations with an explicit exclusion of the French from them. They also suggested an armistice rather than a full peace treaty, in the belief that a peace treaty would require the approval of all of the Allied nations and be too slow.

The negotiations began on Sunday, 27 October on HMS Agamemnon, a British battleship. The British refused to admit French Vice-Admiral Jean Amet, the senior French naval officer in the area, despite his desire to join; the Ottoman delegation, headed by Minister of Marine Affairs Rauf Bey, indicated that it was acceptable as they were accredited only to the British, not the French.

Both sides did not know that the other was actually quite eager to sign a deal and willing to give up some of their objectives to do so. The British delegation had been given a list of 24 demands, but were told to concede on any of them if pressed, except occupation of the forts on the Dardanelles and free passage through the Bosphorus; the British desired access to the Black Sea for the Romanian front. Prime Minister David Lloyd George also wanted to make a deal quickly before the United States could step in; according to the diary of Maurice Hankey:

[Lloyd George] was also very contemptuous of President Wilson and anxious to arrange the division of Turkey between France, Italy, and the United Kingdom before speaking to the USA. He also thought it would attract less attention to our enormous gains during the war if we swallowed our share of Turkey now, and the German colonies later.

The Ottoman authorities, for their part, believed the war to be lost and would have accepted almost any demands placed on them. As a result, the initial draft prepared by the British was accepted largely unchanged; the Ottoman side did not know it could have pushed back on most of the clauses, and the British did not know they could have demanded even more. Still, the terms were largely pro-British and close to an outright surrender; the Ottoman Empire ceded the rights to the Allies to occupy "in case of disorder" any Ottoman territory, a vague and broad clause.

The French were displeased with the precedent; French Premier Georges Clemenceau disliked the British making unilateral decisions in so important a matter. Lloyd George countered that the French had concluded a similar armistice on short notice in the Armistice of Salonica with Bulgaria, which had been negotiated by French General Franchet d'Espèrey, and that Great Britain (and Tsarist Russia) had committed the vast majority of troops to the campaign against the Ottoman Empire. The French agreed to accept the matter as closed. The Ottoman educated public, however, was given misleadingly positive impressions of the severity of the terms of the Armistice. They thought its terms were considerably more lenient than they actually were, a source of discontent later when it seemed that the Allies had violated the offered terms during the Turkish War of Independence.

== Aftermath ==
The Armistice of Mudros officially brought hostilities to an end between the Allies and the Ottoman Empire. However, incursions by the Italians and Greeks into Anatolia in the name of "restoring order" soon came close to an outright partition of the country. The Treaty of Sèvres in 1920 officially partitioned the Ottoman Empire into zones of influence; however, the Turkish War of Independence (1919–23) saw the rejection of the treaty by Turkish nationalist forces based in Ankara, who eventually took control of the Anatolian Peninsula. Ottoman territory in Syria, Palestine, and Arabia stayed as distributed by the Treaty of Sèvres while the borders of the Turkish nation-state were set by the Treaty of Lausanne in 1923.

== See also ==
- Armistice of Salonica
- Armistice of Villa Giusti
- Armistice of 11 November 1918
- Anglo-French Declaration
- Armistices of 1918 on the Eastern and Italian fronts

== Literature ==
- Laura M. Adkisson Great Britain and the Kemalist Movement for Turkish Independence, 1919–1923, Michigan 1958.
- Paul C. Helmreich From Paris to Sèvres. The Partition of the Ottoman Empire at the Peace Conference of 1919–1920, Ohio 1974, S. 3–5, the text can be found at pp. 341f.
- Patrick Balfour Kinross Atatürk: A Biography of Mustafa Kemal, father of modern Turkey, New York 1965.
- Sir Frederick B. Maurice The Armistices of 1918, London 1943.
- Ata, Ferudun (2018). The Relocation Trials in Occupied Istanbul. Offenbach am Main: Manzara Verlag. p. 357. ISBN 9783939795926.
- Uluç, Gürkan (2024). Understanding the Armenian Question: Malta Tribunal (1919–1921). Offenbach am Main: Manzara Verlag. p. 304. ISBN 9783911130004.
