= Armistices of 1918 on the Eastern and Italian fronts =

Armistices by Germany's allies in WW1

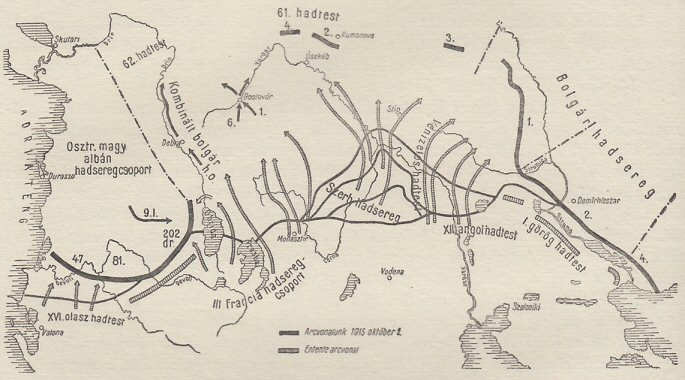
Hungarian Map of the Balkan Front 1918

The Armistices of 1918 on the Eastern and Italian fronts are a series of agreements concluded in the autumn of 1918 by Germany’s allies. At that time, the Central Powers were severely weakened by prolonged warfare and its effects on civilian populations. The failure of German and allied offensives and the success of Entente counteroffensives on the Western Front led their political and military leaders to conclude that defeat was inevitable. The armistices concluded in the autumn of 1918 by Germany’s allies—Bulgaria, the Ottoman Empire, and Austria-Hungary—ended the fighting on the Balkan, Near Eastern, and Italian fronts. These agreements left Germany isolated and contributed to its surrender on 11 November 1918. The armistices resulted in the collapse of the German, Austro-Hungarian, and Ottoman empires and led to a major political reconfiguration of Central Europe and the Near East in favor of the victorious powers. This outcome was accompanied by significant postwar political, economic, and social challenges.

== Central powers in the autumn of 1918 ==
After the failure of the German offensives in France and the Austro-Hungarian offensive on the Piave, the arrival of American reinforcements on the Western Front, and the exhaustion of their manpower, the Central Empires concluded that they could no longer win the war. Nevertheless, the conflict continued for several months due to the inability of their leaders to reach a political solution. Bulgaria, the Ottoman Empire, and Austria-Hungary were concerned about both Germany’s reaction and that of their own populations.

As Reich Chancellor Hertling candidly admitted to the Prussian cabinet on 3 September 1918, the Reich had exhausted its reserves by the end of the summer of 1918.

In Austria, Emperor Charles sought to initiate peace negotiations following the failure of earlier overtures, aiming to prevent the disintegration of the Dual Monarchy, at a time when the army was showing signs of weakening. After the collapse of Bulgaria, Charles faced representatives of the empire’s nationalities, who were advocating for independence with support from the Social Democrats and the German Christian Socials. He proposed a reform of Cisleithania, while in Hungary, statesmen opposed measures that would challenge Magyar supremacy. Following a note from President Wilson on 21 October 1918 reaffirming the right of the peoples of the Dual Monarchy to self-determination, Charles appointed Heinrich Lammasch to lead efforts to preserve a federal structure. In Hungary, Sándor Wekerle resigned, and Mihály Károlyi, who opposed the continuation of the monarchy, formed a government. On 24 October, the Italian army launched a final offensive against Austria-Hungary, which was already undergoing political disintegration.

In Germany, the following weeks saw the implementation of institutional reforms transferring power to the Reichstag.

== Bulgarian armistice ==
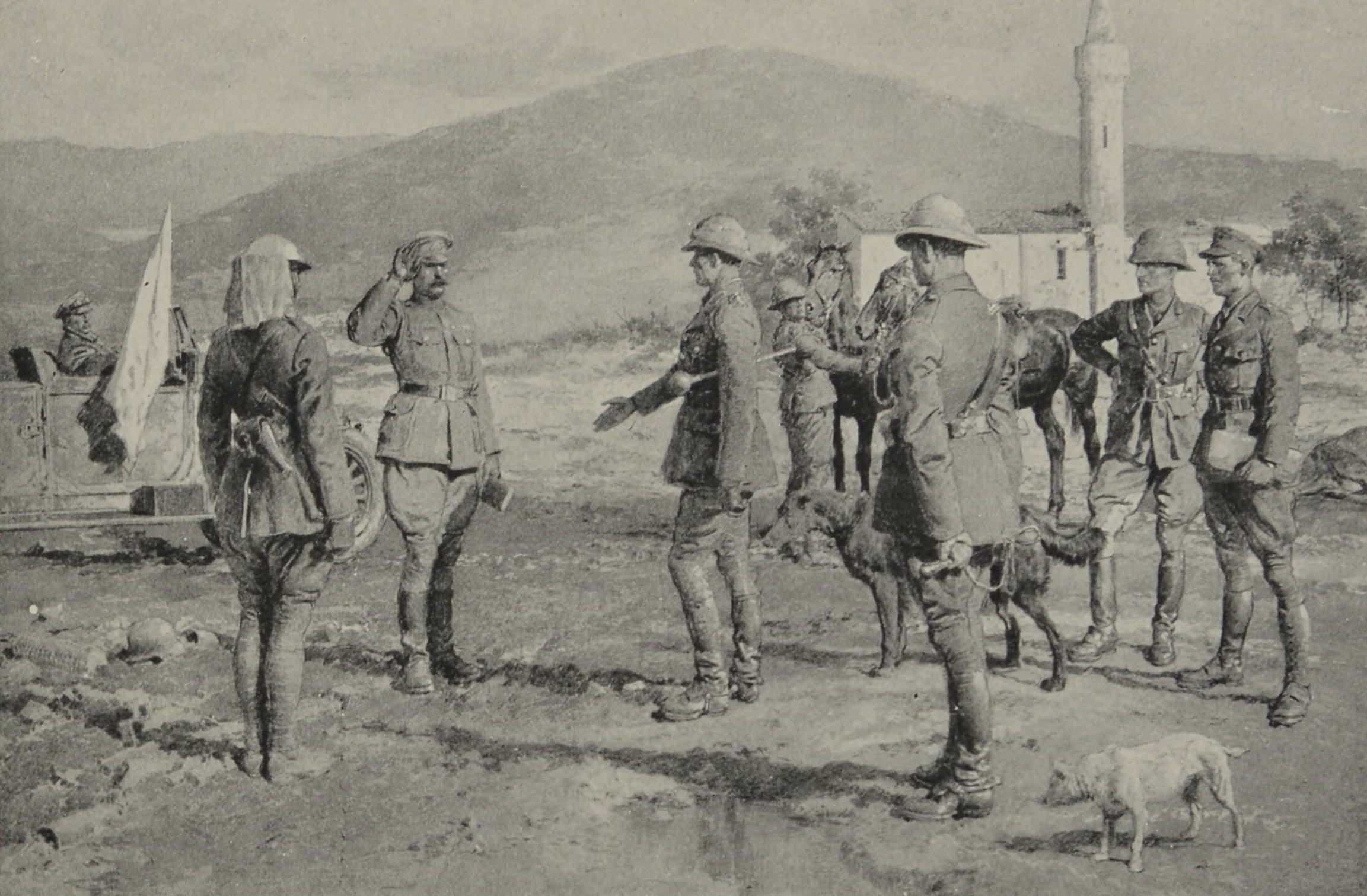
Arrival of Bulgaria’s white flag of Surrender at a British army Headquarters

The Entente offensive at Dobro Pole in September 1918 resulted in the collapse of the Bulgarian army, amid declining morale and dissatisfaction within Bulgaria’s ruling circles toward Germany. Poor living and supply conditions contributed to unrest, and mutinies occurred among military units. The Bulgarian Agrarian National Union, the main opposition party, attempted to organize the mutinous soldiers and declare a republic on 27 September, but the effort, lacking support from socialists, was suppressed by royal forces with German assistance. On 3 October, King Ferdinand abdicated in favor of his son, Boris III.

The collapse of the Macedonian front in September 1918 led the Bulgarian king and high command to request an armistice on 26 September from French commander-in-chief Franchet d’Espèrey. Despite initial reservations from Germany, the Bulgarian representatives accepted the terms proposed on 28 September, which were not submitted to the Allied Supreme Council. The armistice required the demobilization of the Bulgarian army to three divisions, the evacuation of Greek and Serbian territories occupied by Bulgarian forces, and the surrender of military equipment located in those areas. To ensure compliance, the Army of the Orient occupied several strategic locations, without entering Sofia.

In response, the Central Powers deployed ten divisions—four German and six Austro-Hungarian—under the command of Hermann Kövess to the Balkans in an attempt to establish a defensive line on the southern flank of the Austro-Hungarian Empire. From his headquarters in Belgrade, established on 8 October, Kövess organized a front in Serbia. Although he succeeded in assembling his forces, the relatively weak units were unable to stop the advance of Franco-Serbian troops, who captured Niš and Mitrovica on 22 October.

Hindenburg and Ludendorff, heads of the German high command, recognized the futility of these countermeasures on the evening of 28 September.

The collapse of the Macedonian front facilitated Romania's re-entry into the war, isolated the Ottoman Empire geographically, and enabled advances toward the Austro-Hungarian frontier.

Serbian forces reoccupied Macedonia, previously occupied by Bulgaria in 1915. Franco-Serbian troops advanced to the Danube, while British and Greek forces moved through Bulgarian territory, posing a threat to Constantinople.

== Ottoman armistice ==
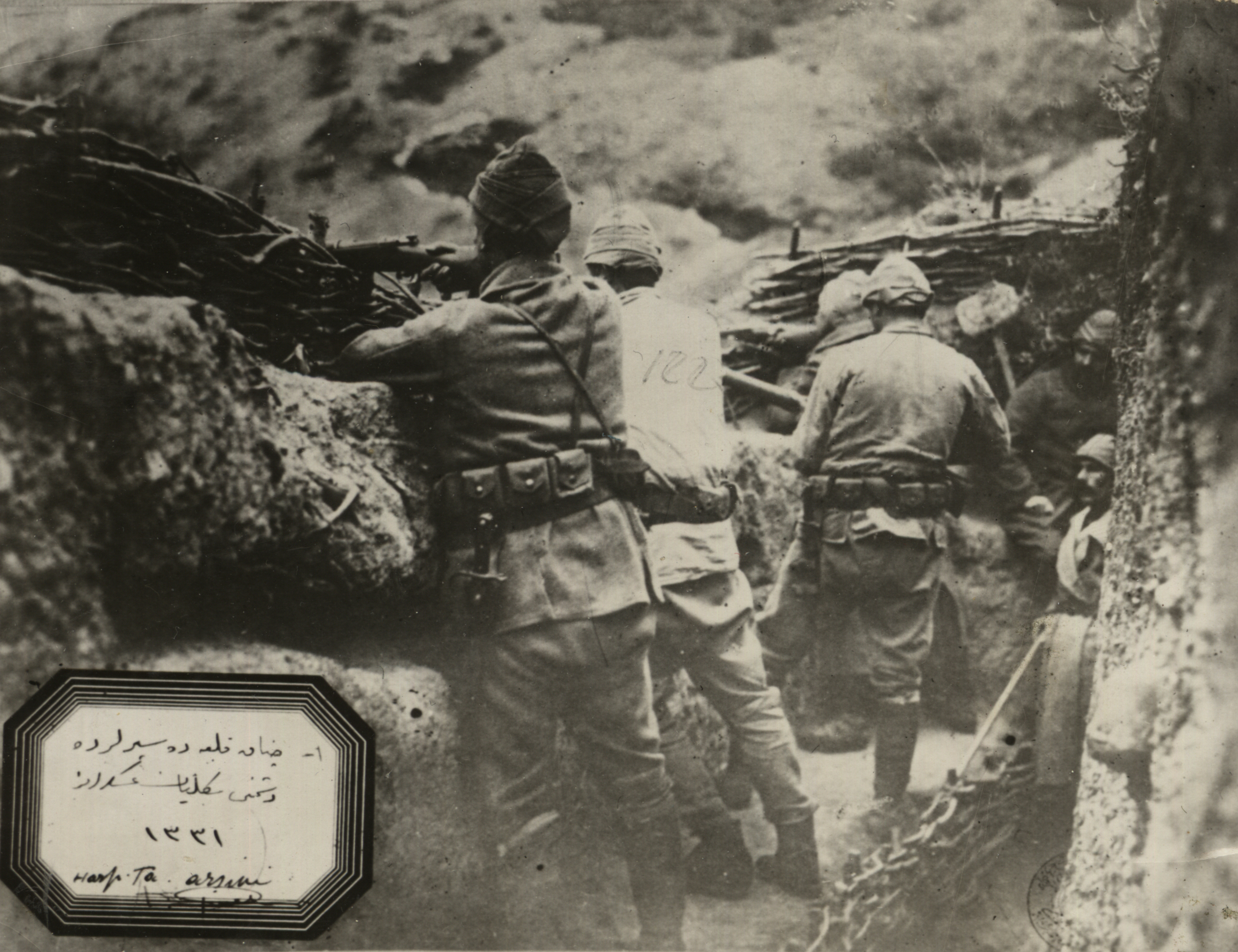
Ottoman troops during WW1

Ottoman forces, weakened by defeats in Syria–Palestine and Iraq and affected by the Arab Revolt in their rear, were unable to respond to the threat to their capital from Thrace.

By early October, the Ottoman General Staff had only eight divisions available, while German divisions previously deployed in the region were recalled by Ludendorff. The government, from 7 October onward, sought to negotiate an armistice and initiated discussions with the Allies. Through the intermediary of British General Townshend, a prisoner since 1916, negotiations between the Ottoman Empire and the United Kingdom were opened, and on 30 October the United Kingdom informed its allies, including France, of the armistice agreement.

The armistice clauses stipulated the disarmament of the Ottoman Empire, the occupation of the Dardanelles, the Bosphorus, and other strategic lines of communication, and, on the diplomatic level, required the sultan’s government to sever all relations with Germany.

Sultan Mehmed VI accepted the armistice, which was signed at Mudros on 30 October between his Minister of the Navy, Rauf Orbay, and British Admiral Somerset Gough-Calthorpe. The agreement placed a significant portion of Ottoman territory under Entente occupation. Similar to the approach of Franchet d’Espèrey with Bulgaria, Admiral Calthorpe did not consult his allies before concluding hostilities with the Ottoman Empire. Following the armistice, the Allied fleet entered the Bosphorus on 13 November, and the British Mesopotamian army reached Baku on 16 November to oversee the evacuation of Ottoman troops.

Unlike other leaders, Mehmed VI retained his throne by attributing responsibility for the war and associated atrocities, including the Armenian genocide, to the military leaders of the Committee of Union and Progress. Enver Pasha and other members of the committee had left for Berlin several days before the armistice.

== Austro-Hungarian armistice ==
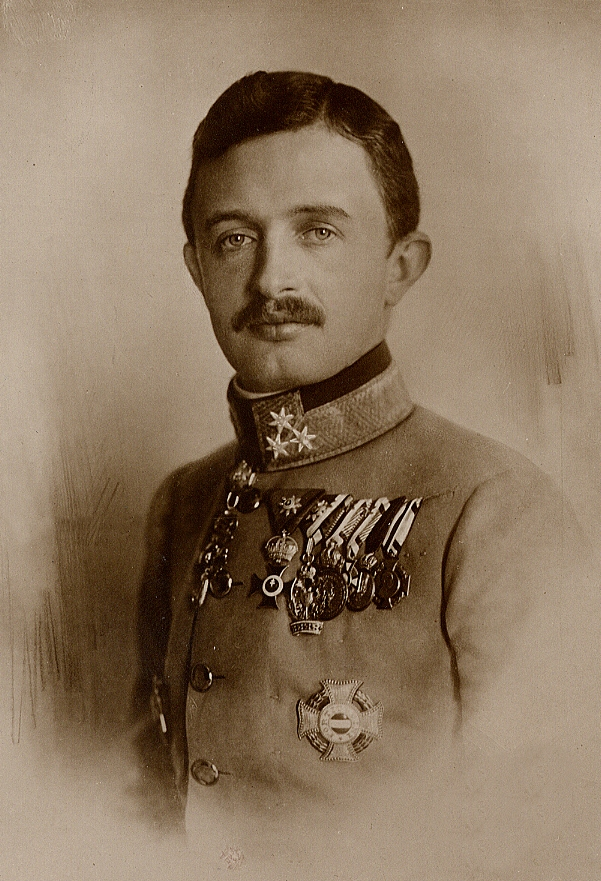
Emperor Charles I, last ruler of the Austro-Hungarian empire

Emperor Charles I, after unsuccessful attempts to negotiate a separate peace, was unable to distance Austria-Hungary from its German allies. Following the reopening of the Austrian parliament, he faced representatives of the empire’s nationalities, who were advocating for independence with support from the Social Democrats and the German Christian Socials. On 17 October, Charles proposed a system of autonomy for the subject peoples. The proposal was opposed by German conservatives and Hungarian leaders, who resisted measures that would challenge Magyar supremacy, while it did not fully address the demands of the Slavic and Latin populations. Earlier, in September, the collapse of the Bulgarian front had raised concerns about a potential invasion from the south, and national committees were established by the Czechs and, subsequently, by the South Slavs.

On 21 October, U.S. President Woodrow Wilson issued a statement supporting the right to self-determination for the peoples of Central Europe, which contributed to the acceleration of the empire’s disintegration. Hungary acted as an independent state, recalling its troops from the Italian front in response to threats to its borders from the advance of Franco-Serbian forces on the Danube and Romania's re-entry into the war.

On 27 October, Emperor Charles appointed the jurist Heinrich Lammasch, a former opponent of the war in the Upper House of the Reichsrat, as head of government. Lammasch’s authority was largely nominal, as the Cisleithanian government acknowledged its inability to govern while remaining in office, alongside the emperor.

On 28 October, the Czechs declared independence in Prague, with the emperor’s representative not opposing the proclamation in accordance with his instructions. On 29 October, the Croats, Slovenes, and Serbs within Austria-Hungary announced their intention to join Serbia in the creation of the “Kingdom of Serbs, Croats, and Slovenes,” later known as Yugoslavia. On 30 October, the Slovaks declared separation from Hungary and requested union with the Czechs. On 31 October, the Ukrainians of Galicia proclaimed their independence.

In Hungary, on 30 October, Sándor Wekerle resigned, and Count Mihály Károlyi, who opposed the political system established in 1867, formed a government. Magyar troops on the Italian front were concerned by reports of developments at home, as Hungary faced potential threats from Romanian forces and the advance of Franco-Serbian troops under Franchet d’Espèrey in Serbia.

The Italian offensive at Vittorio Veneto, from 24 to 31 October, resulted in the defeat of the Austro-Hungarian army. Approximately 350,000 Austro-Hungarian soldiers surrendered, believing that an armistice had already been signed. The armistice was formally concluded on 3 November at Villa Giusti near Padua between the Austrian delegation led by General von Webenau and the Italian delegation representing the king, led by General Pietro Badoglio. Following the armistice, Italian forces occupied Trento, Trieste, Istria, and the border regions of Slovenia.

The armistice deferred the resolution of territorial disputes between Serbs and Italians in the Balkans to the subsequent peace negotiations, requiring only the evacuation of the areas specified in the Treaty of London. It established strict conditions for disarmament and allowed Allied troops to transit through Austrian territory toward southern Germany. The provision permitting Allied troop movements created uncertainty within the Austrian command, as Emperor Charles had assured the German Kaiser that he would oppose such crossings, while military leaders advocated for an immediate armistice.

Without formally abdicating, Charles I renounced on 11 November “all participation in the affairs of the state.” He withdrew first to a residence in Lower Austria and later to Switzerland, while the Republic of German Austria was proclaimed in Vienna on 12 November.

Following this, Romania denounced the Treaty of Bucharest, signed with Austria-Hungary and Germany on 7 May 1918, and re-entered the war against the Central Powers. Romanian forces expelled Austrian troops from their territory and entered Bukovina on 27 November and Transylvania on 1 December, after the armistice.

== Consequences ==
The armistices on the eastern fronts, while less widely known than the armistice of Rethondes, had significant consequences for Europe and the Near East.

They contributed to Germany’s defeat by isolating it from its allies and depriving it of substantial supplies of grain and raw materials, while leaving its eastern borders vulnerable.

The armistices also reshaped the political landscape of the region, creating divisions between the defeated states (Germany, Austria-Hungary, Hungary, Bulgaria, and the Ottoman Empire), the victorious states (Czechoslovakia, Serbia, Romania, and Poland), and those entities that joined the Allies later and did not achieve immediate independence (including Ukrainians, Slovaks, smaller groups in the future Yugoslavia, and Arab populations).

== See also ==
- Armistice of Villa Giusti
- Armistice of Mudros
- Armistice of Salonica
- History of Austria-Hungary during World War I
- Ottoman Empire in World War I
- Bulgaria during World War I

== Bibliography ==
- Fischer, Fritz (1970). Les Buts de guerre de l'Allemagne impériale (1914-1918) [The War Aims of Imperial Germany (1914–1918)] (in French). Paris: Éditions de Trévise.
- Renouvin, Pierre (1934). La Crise européenne et la Première Guerre mondiale [The European Crisis and World War I]. Peuples et civilisations (in French). Paris: Presses universitaires de France.
- Schiavon, Max (2011). L'Autriche-Hongrie la Première Guerre mondiale : La fin d'un empire [Austria-Hungary in World War I: The End of an Empire]. Les Nations dans la Grande Guerre (in French). Paris: Éditions SOTECA. ISBN 978-2-916385-59-4.
