= Armistice of Salonica =

1918 surrender of Bulgaria to the Allies of World War I

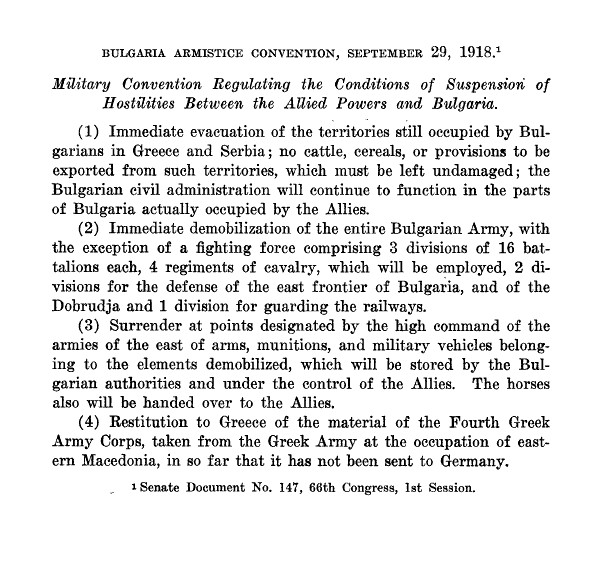
The official terms of the armistice with Bulgaria.

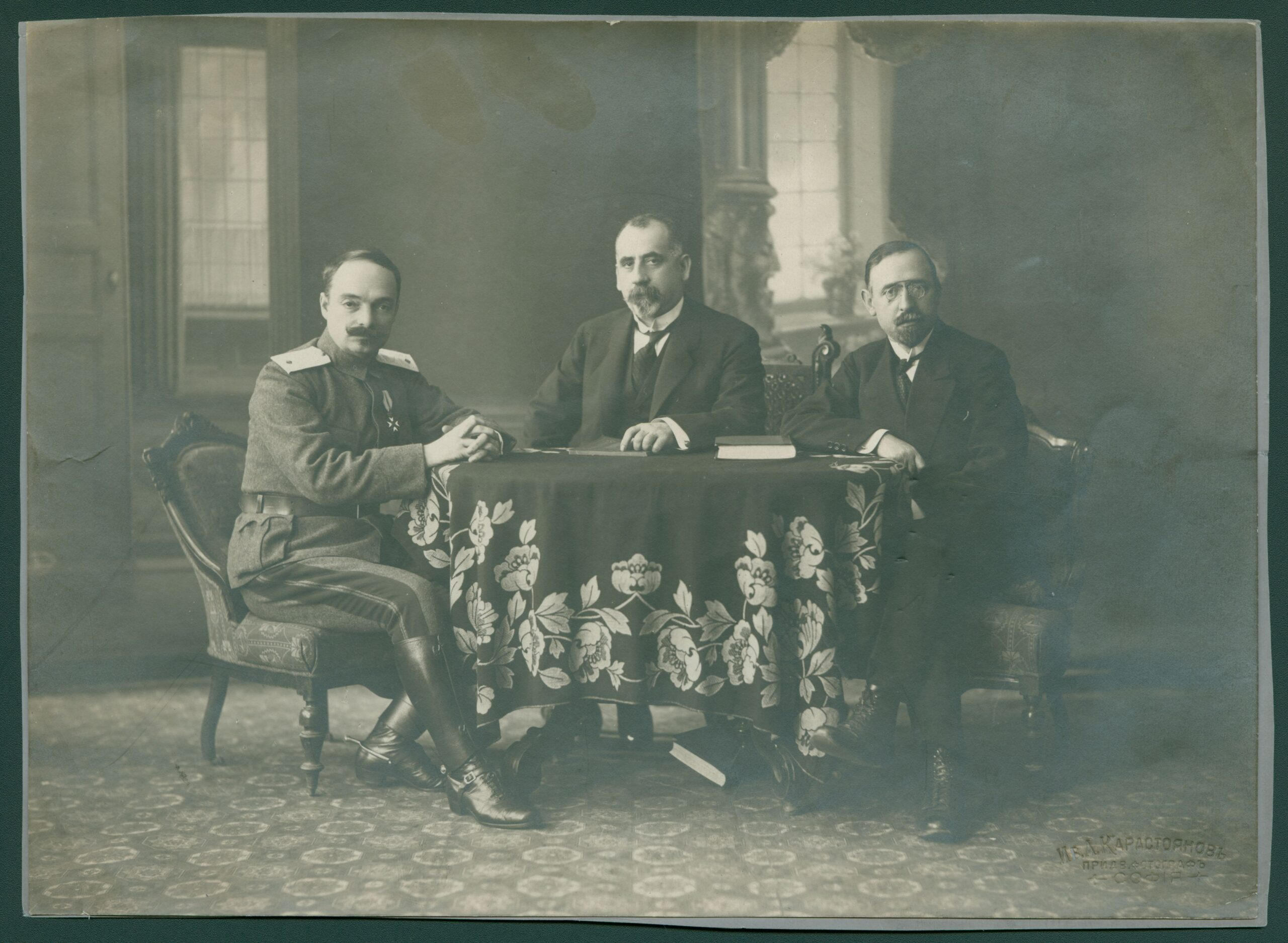
The Bulgarian delegates: Major General Ivan Lukov, Andrey Lyapchev and Simeon Radev.

The Armistice of Salonica (also known as the Armistice of Thessalonica) was the armistice signed at 10:50 p.m. on 29 September 1918 between Bulgaria and the Allied Powers at the General Headquarters of the Allied Army of the Orient in Thessaloniki. The armistice came into force at noon on 30 September 1918. The armistice would remain in effect until the conclusion of the Treaty of Neuilly-sur-Seine, the final general peace treaty, in November 1919.

The Kingdom of Bulgaria entered World War I on the side of the Central Powers on 14 October 1915, invading and occupying parts of Serbia. However, Bulgarian forces would struggle against the Vardar offensive launched by the Allies in September 1918, causing part of the Bulgarian Army to collapse, and an open mutiny of rebellious troops who proclaimed a republic at Radomir. The Bulgarian government then requested a ceasefire on 24 September. The terms included the withdrawal of Bulgarian forces in occupied areas and the demobilization of most of Bulgaria's army.

== Surrender ==
The armistice effectively ended Bulgaria's participation in World War I on the side of the Central Powers and came into effect on the Bulgarian Front at noon on 30 September. The armistice regulated the demobilization and the disarmament of the Bulgarian armed forces.

The signatories were, for the Allies, French General Louis Franchet d'Espérey, commander of the Allied Army of the Orient, and a commission appointed by the Bulgarian government, which was composed of General Ivan Lukov (member of the Bulgarian Army headquarters), Andrey Lyapchev (cabinet member) and Simeon Radev (diplomat).

Its importance was described by German Emperor Wilhelm II in his telegram to Bulgarian Tsar Ferdinand I: "Disgraceful! 62,000 Serbs decided the war!"

On 29 September 1918, the Oberste Heeresleitung (German Supreme Army Command) informed Wilhelm and the German Chancellor, Count Georg von Hertling, that Germany's military situation was hopeless. On 14 October 1918, the Austro-Hungarian Empire asked for an armistice, and on 15 October 1918 Turkish Grand Vizier Ahmed Izzet Pasha sent a captured British general, Charles Vere Ferrers Townshend, to the Allies to seek terms for an armistice.

== Terms ==
The terms called for the immediate demobilization of all Bulgarian military activities. It ordered the evacuation of Bulgarian-occupied Greek and Serbian territories, placed limits and restrictions to the size of Bulgaria's military employment and required Bulgaria to return military equipment that had been taken from the Greek Fourth Army Corps during the Bulgarian occupation of Eastern Macedonia in 1916. German and Austro-Hungarian troops were to leave Bulgaria within four weeks. Bulgaria and especially Sofia were not to be occupied, but the Allies had the right to occupy some strategic points temporarily and to transfer troops over Bulgarian territory.

According to Article 5, about 150,000 Bulgarian soldiers to the west of the Skopje meridian were to be delivered to the Entente as hostages.

The French would send troops to Romania and the British and Greeks to European Turkey, which was still at war with the Allies.

The armistice would remain in effect until the conclusion of the Treaty of Neuilly-sur-Seine, the final general peace treaty, in November 1919.

== Sources ==
- (1919) "Bulgaria Armistice Convention, September 29th, 1918". The American Journal of International Law Vol. 13 No.4 Supplement: Official Documents, 402-404.
- Axelrod, Alan (2018). How America Won World War I. Rowman & Littlefield. ISBN 978-1493031924.

== See also ==
- Battle of Dobro Pole
- Serbian Campaign of World War I
- Macedonian front
- Armistices of 1918 on the Eastern and Italian fronts
