= Villa Giusti =

Villa outside of Padua, northern Italy

Coordinates: 45°22′15″N 11°50′34″E

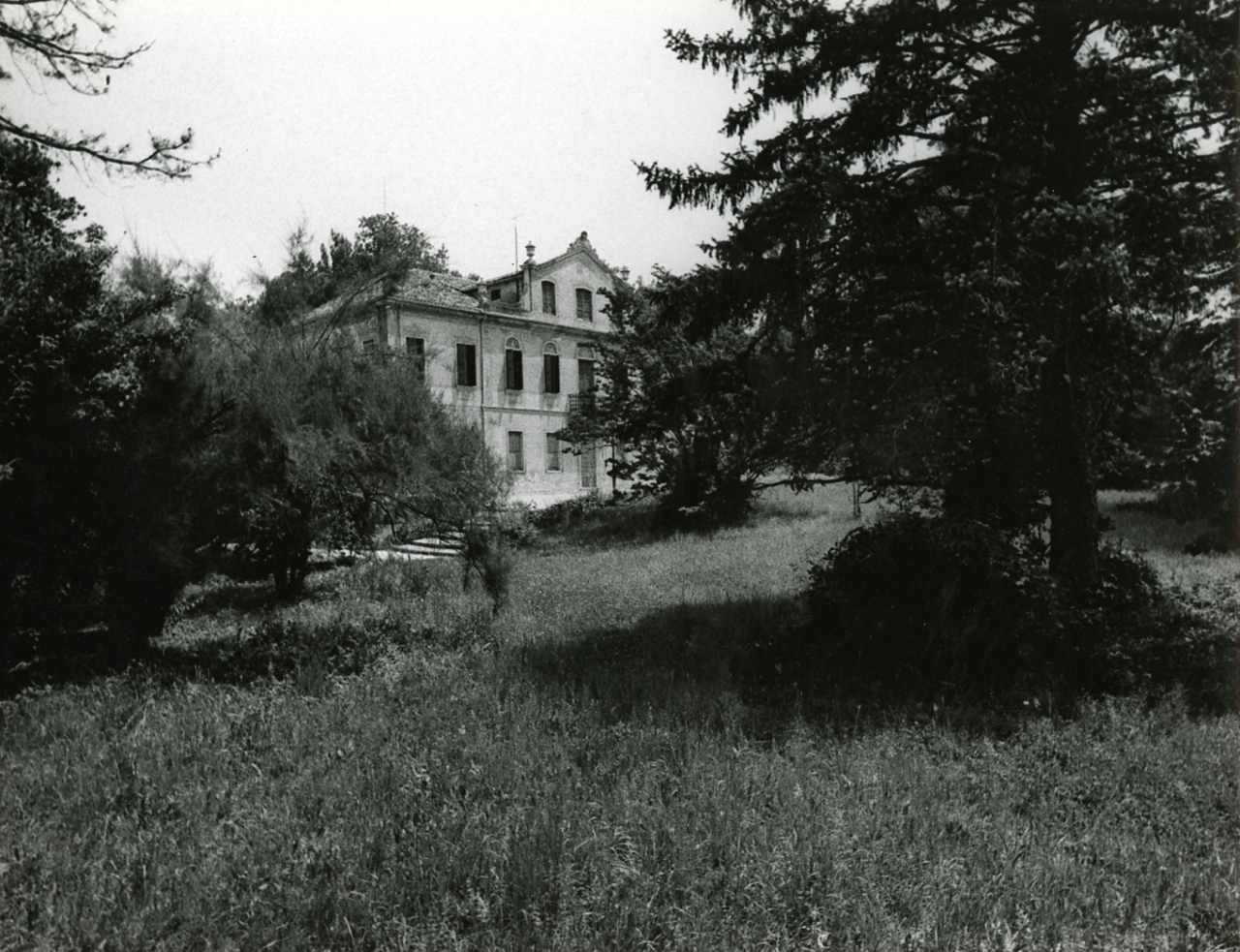
- Villa Giusti in 1967, photo by Paolo Monti
- Interactive map of the Villa Giusti area

General information
- Status: Completed
- Type: Villa
- Location: Armistice Street 277/A, Mandria, Padua
- Renovated: 1875
- Owner: Lanfranchi family

Technical details
- Floor count: 2

Design and construction
- Known for: Site of the signing of the Armistice of Villa Giusti

Website
- villagiusti.it

Villa Giusti or Villa Giusti del Giardino is a villa in Mandria, outside of Padua in Northern Italy. It is notable for being the site of the signing of the Armistice of Villa Giusti that ended the First World War on the Italian Front.

Fully restored in the nineteenth century, the villa was owned at the time of the armistice by the Count Vettor Giusti del Giardino, of a Veneto noble family. Giusti del Giardino was the mayor of Padua in the 1890s and a senator of the Kingdom of Italy from 1915.

Before the armistice, the villa was the temporary residence of King Victor Emmanuel III, who came back from the front and wanted to avoid the aerial bombardment of Padua's city centre. He established his command and stayed there from November 1917 until January 1918.

The Armistice of Villa Giusti ended warfare between Italy and Austria-Hungary on the Italian Front during the First World War. The armistice was signed on 3 November 1918 and took effect 24 hours later. In the room where the negotiations were conducted and the armistice was signed, the furniture remains just as it was on that day.

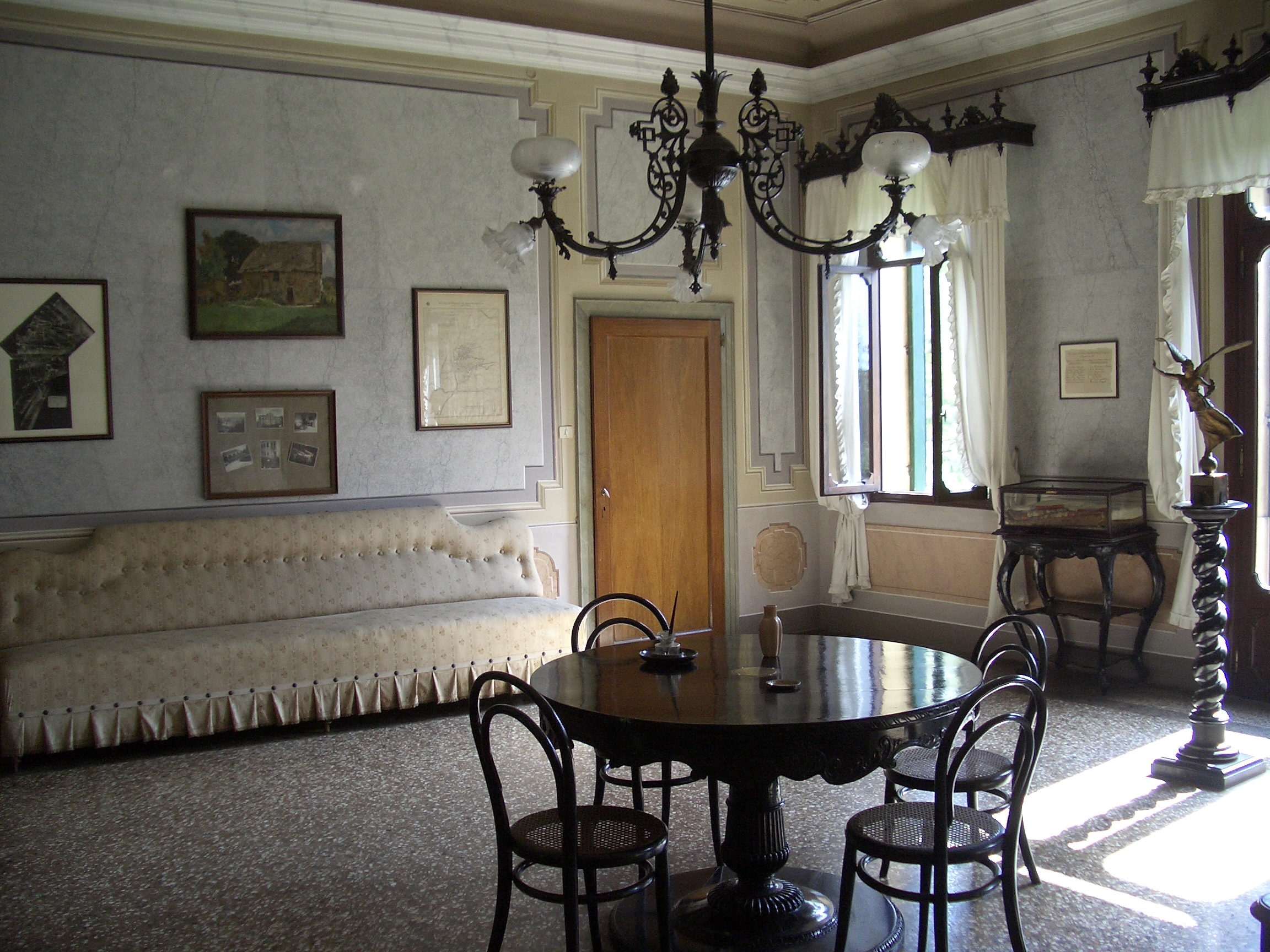
The table in Villa Giusti where the Armistice of Villa Giusti was signed

== See also ==
- Villa Molin, nearby site of preliminary negotiations for the Armistice of Villa Giusti
