= Armistice of Villa Giusti =

1918 convention between the Allies and Austria-Hungary

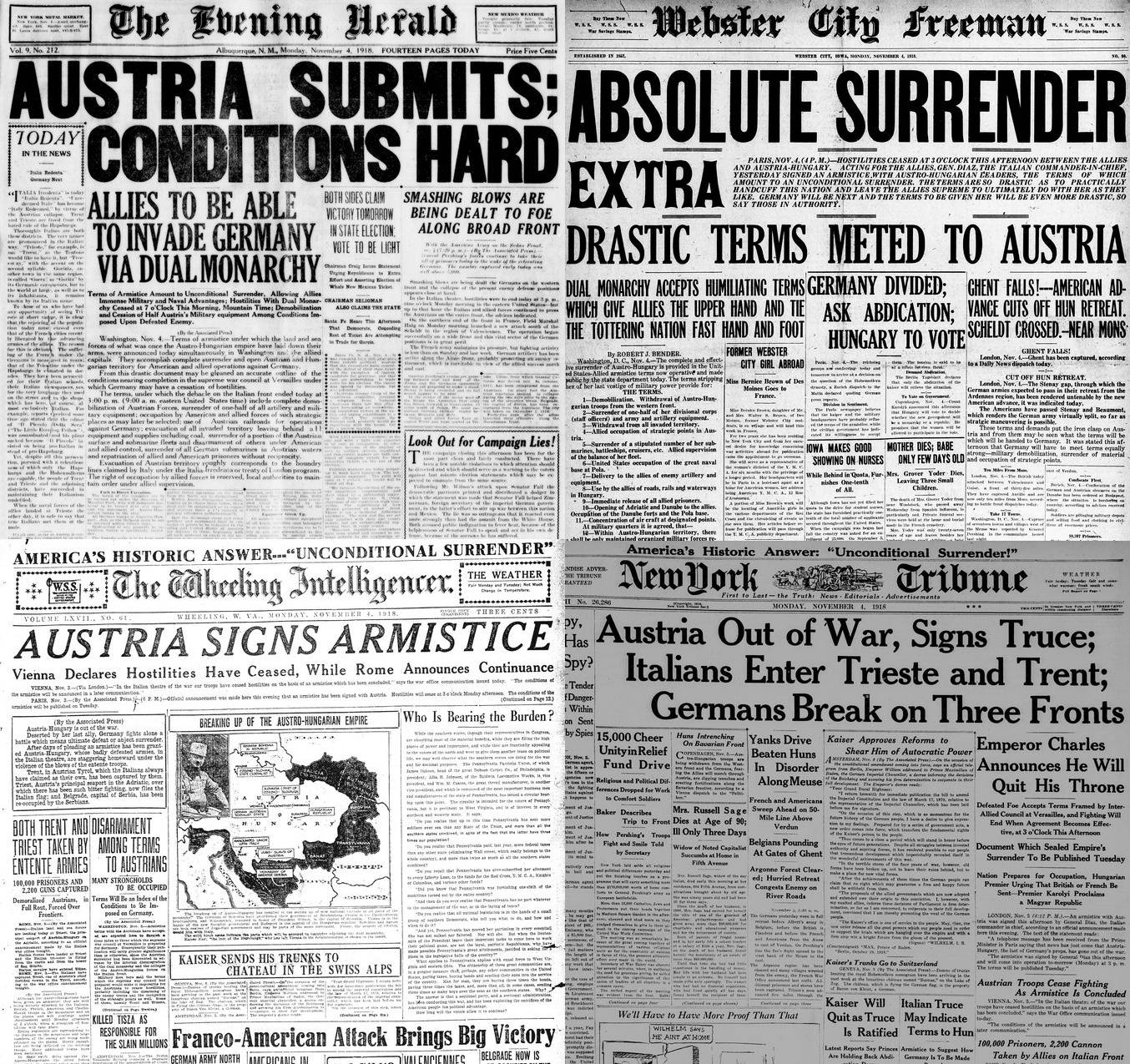
Nov 4, 1918, US media coverage of Austria-Hungary exiting WWI

The Armistice of Villa Giusti or Padua Armistice was an armistice convention with Austria-Hungary which de facto ended warfare between Allies and Associated Powers and Austria-Hungary during World War I. Italy represented the Allies and Associated Powers. The armistice protocol, together with a supplementary protocol, was signed on 3 November 1918 in the Villa Giusti, outside Padua in the Veneto, Northern Italy, and took effect 24 hours later. This armistice applied only to Austria because Hungary later signed the separate Belgrade armistice.

== Background ==
By the end of October 1918, the Austro-Hungarian Army was so fatigued that its commanders sought a ceasefire. By 1918, the Austro-Hungarian Empire was tearing itself apart under ethnic lines, and if the Dual Monarchy were to survive, it needed to withdraw from the war.

In the final stage of the Battle of Vittorio Veneto, a stalemate was reached, and the troops of Austria-Hungary started a chaotic withdrawal. On 28 October, Austria-Hungary asked Italy for an armistice They hesitated to sign the text of the armistice. Italy demanded Austria accept it by 3 November at 00:00 o'clock, and they did so. It entered into force the next day.

In the meantime, the Italians reached Trento and Udine, landed in Trieste, and aimed at making as many prisoners of war (POWs) as possible. They seized approximately 380,000 Austro-Hungarian POWs, and 30,000 of them died during their captivity.

== Terms ==
The ceasefire was to start at 15:00 on 4 November. Austrian commander General Weber had asked Italians to cease combat immediately and to stop any further Italian advance. The proposal was sharply rejected by the Italian General Pietro Badoglio, who threatened to stop all negotiations and to continue the war.

The armistice required Austria-Hungary's forces to evacuate not only all territory occupied since August 1914 but also South Tirol, Tarvisio, the Isonzo Valley, Gorizia, Trieste, Istria, western Carniola, and part of Dalmatia. All German forces would be expelled from Austria-Hungary within 15 days or interned, and the Allies were to have the unrestricted use of Austria-Hungary's internal communications. Austria-Hungary was also to allow the transit of the Triple Entente armies to reach Germany from the South. In November 1918, the Italian Army, with 20,000 to 22,000 soldiers, began to occupy Innsbruck and all North Tyrol.

After the war, Italy annexed Southern Tyrol (now Trentino-Alto Adige/Südtirol), according to the secret Treaty of London, as well as Trieste, Austrian Littoral and part of Dalmatia (Zadar, Lastovo, Palagruža).

== Signatories ==
=== Italy ===
- Tenente Generale Pietro Badoglio
- Maggior Generale Scipione Scipioni
- Colonnello Tullio Marchetti
- Colonnello Pietro Gazzera
- Colonnello Pietro Maravigna
- Colonnello Alberto Pariani
- Capitano di Vascello Francesco Accinni

=== Austria-Hungary ===
- General Viktor Weber Edler von Webenau
- Oberst Karl Schneller
- Fregattenkapitän Johannes Prinz von und zu Liechtenstein
- Oberstleutnant J.V. Nyékhegyi
- Korvettenkapitän Georg Ritter von Zwierkowski
- Oberstleutnant i.G. Victor Freiherr von Seiller
- Hauptmann i.G. Camillo Ruggera

== See also ==
- Bollettino della Vittoria, Italian General Armando Diaz's victory speech
- Treaty of Saint-Germain-en-Laye (1919), the resulting treaty
- Treaty of Trianon, the peace treaty for Hungary
- Armistices of 1918 on the Eastern and Italian fronts
