= Yugoslav torpedo boat T5 =

Sea-going torpedo boat

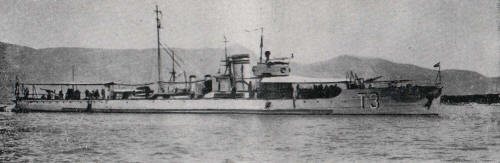
- T5's sister ship, T3, the only significant external difference was that T5 had two funnels

History

Austria-Hungary
- Name: 87 F then 87
- Builder: Ganz & Danubius
- Laid down: 5 March 1914
- Launched: 20 March 1915
- Commissioned: 28 September 1915
- Out of service: November 1918
- Fate: Assigned to the Kingdom of Serbs, Croats and Slovenes

Kingdom of Yugoslavia
- Name: T5
- Acquired: March 1921
- Out of service: April 1941
- Fate: Captured by Italy

Italy
- Name: T5
- Acquired: April 1941
- Out of service: September 1943
- Fate: Returned to Yugoslavia

Kingdom of Yugoslavia
- Name: T5
- Acquired: December 1943
- Out of service: May 1945

Yugoslavia
- Name: Cer (Цер)
- Namesake: Battle of Cer (1914)
- Acquired: May 1945
- Out of service: 1963
- Fate: Broken up

General characteristics
- Class & type: 250t-class, F-group sea-going torpedo boat
- Displacement: 243.9 t (240 long tons); 267 t (263 long tons) (full load)
- Length: 58.76 m (192 ft 9 in)
- Beam: 5.84 m (19 ft 2 in)
- Draught: 1.5 m (4 ft 11 in)
- Installed power: 5,000–6,000 shp (3,700–4,500 kW); 2 × Yarrow water-tube boilers
- Propulsion: 2 × shafts; 2 × AEG-Curtis steam turbines
- Speed: 28–29 kn (52–54 km/h; 32–33 mph)
- Range: 1,200 nmi (2,200 km; 1,400 mi) at 16 kn (30 km/h; 18 mph)
- Complement: 41
- Armament: 2 × Škoda 66 mm (2.6 in) L/30 guns; 4 × 450 mm (17.7 in) torpedo tubes; 1 × 8 mm (0.31 in) machine gun; 10–12 naval mines

T5 was a sea-going torpedo boat operated by the Royal Yugoslav Navy between 1921 and 1941. Originally 87 F, a 250t-class torpedo boat of the Austro-Hungarian Navy built in 1914–1915, she was armed with two 66 mm (2.6 in) guns and four 450 mm (17.7 in) torpedo tubes, and could carry 10–12 naval mines. She saw active service during World War I, performing convoy, patrol, escort and minesweeping tasks, anti-submarine operations and shore bombardment missions. In 1917 the suffixes of all Austro-Hungarian torpedo boats were removed, and thereafter she was referred to as 87. She was part of the escort force for the Austro-Hungarian dreadnought Szent István during the action that resulted in the sinking of that ship by Italian torpedo boats in June 1918, and rescued many of her crew.

Following Austria-Hungary's defeat in 1918, 87 was allocated to the Navy of the Kingdom of Serbs, Croats and Slovenes, which later became the Royal Yugoslav Navy, and was renamed T5. At the time, she and the seven other 250t-class boats were the only modern sea-going vessels of the fledgling maritime force. During the interwar period, T5 and the rest of the navy were involved in exercises of training and cruises to friendly ports, but activity was limited by reduced naval budgets. The boat was captured by the Italians during the German-led Axis invasion of Yugoslavia in April 1941. After her main armament was modernised, she served with the Royal Italian Navy under her Yugoslav designation, conducting coastal and second-line escort duties in the Adriatic Sea. Following the Italian capitulation in September 1943, she was returned to the Royal Yugoslav Navy-in-exile and continued serving as T5. At the end of the war, she was transferred to the new Yugoslav Navy and served as Cer in guard ship, patrol ship and training ship roles until she was stricken off the naval register in 1963 and scrapped soon after.

== Background ==
In 1910, the Austria-Hungary Naval Technical Committee initiated the design and development of a 275-tonne (271-long-ton) coastal torpedo boat, specifying that it should be capable of sustaining 30 knots (56 km/h; 35 mph) for 10 hours. At the same time, the committee issued design parameters for a high seas or fleet torpedo boat of 500–550 t (490–540 long tons), top speed of 30 kn and endurance of 480 nautical miles (890 km; 550 mi). This design would have been a larger and better-armed vessel than the existing Austro-Hungarian 400-tonne (390-long-ton) Huszár-class destroyers. The specification for the high seas torpedo boat was based on an expectation that the Strait of Otranto, where the Adriatic Sea meets the Ionian Sea, would be blockaded by hostile forces during a future conflict. In such circumstances, there would be a need for a torpedo boat that could sail from the Austro-Hungarian Navy (German: kaiserliche und königliche Kriegsmarine, Hungarian: Császári és Királyi Haditengerészet) base at the Bocche di Cattaro (the Bocche or Bay of Kotor) to the strait during the night, locate and attack blockading ships and return to port before morning. Steam turbine power was selected for propulsion, as diesels with the necessary power were not available, and the Austro-Hungarian Navy did not have the practical experience to run turbo-electric boats. Despite having developed these ideas, the Austro-Hungarian Navy then asked shipyards to submit proposals for a 250 t (250-long-ton) boat with a maximum speed of 28 kn (52 km/h; 32 mph). Stabilimento Tecnico Triestino (STT) of Trieste was selected for the contract to build the first eight vessels, designated as the T-group. Another tender was requested for four more boats, but when Ganz & Danubius reduced their price by ten per cent, a total of sixteen boats were ordered from them, designated the F-group. The F-group designation signified the location of Ganz & Danubius' main shipyard at Fiume.

== Description and construction ==
The 250t-class F-group boats had short raised forecastles and an open bridge, and were fast and agile, well designed for service in the Adriatic. They had a waterline length of 58.76 metres (192 ft 9 in), a beam of 5.84 m (19 ft 2 in), and a normal draught of 1.5 m (4 ft 11 in). While their designed displacement was 243.9 t (240 long tons), they displaced 267 tonnes (263 long tons) fully loaded. The boats were powered by two AEG-Curtis steam turbines driving two propellers, using steam generated by two Yarrow water-tube boilers, one of which burned fuel oil and the other coal. There were two boiler rooms, one behind the other. The turbines were rated at 5,000 shaft horsepower (3,700 kW) with a maximum output of 6,000 shp (4,500 kW) and were designed to propel the boats to a top speed of 28–29 kn (52–54 km/h; 32–33 mph). They carried 20.2 tonnes (19.9 long tons) of coal and 31 tonnes (30.5 long tons) of fuel oil, which gave them a range of 1,200 nautical miles (2,200 km; 1,400 mi) at 16 kn (30 km/h; 18 mph). The F-group had two funnels rather than the single funnel of the T-group. 79 T and the rest of the 250t class were classified as high seas torpedo boats by the Austro-Hungarian Navy, despite being smaller than the original concept for a coastal torpedo boat. The naval historian Zvonimir Freivogel states that this type of situation was common due to the parsimony of the Austro-Hungarian Navy. They were the first small Austro-Hungarian Navy boats to use turbines, and this contributed to ongoing problems with them, which had to be progressively solved once they were in service. The crew consisted of three officers and thirty-eight enlisted men. The vessel carried one 4 m (13 ft) yawl as a ship's boat.

The boats were armed with two Škoda 66 mm (2.6 in) L/30 (Note: L/30 denotes the length of the gun's barrel. In this case, the L/30 gun is 30 calibre, meaning that the barrel was 30 times as long as the diameter of its bore.) guns, with the forward gun mounted on the forecastle, and the aft gun on the quarterdeck. A 40 cm (16 in) searchlight was mounted above the bridge. They were also armed with four 450 mm (17.7 in) torpedo tubes mounted in pairs, with one pair mounted between the forecastle and bridge, and the other aft of the mainmast. They could also carry 10–12 naval mines.

The first of the F-group to be completed at Ganz-Danubius' main shipyard at Fiume, 87 F was laid down on 5 March 1914, launched on 20 March 1915, and commissioned on 28 September. Prior to her commissioning, one 8 mm (0.31 in) Schwarzlose M.7/12 machine gun was included in the armament of all boats of the class for anti-aircraft work. Four mounting points were installed so that the machine gun could be mounted in the most effective position depending on the expected direction of attack.

== Career ==
=== World War I ===
The original concept of operation for the 250t-class boats was that they would sail in a flotilla at the rear of a cruising battle formation, and were to intervene in fighting only if the battleships around which the formation was established were disabled, or in order to attack damaged enemy battleships. When a torpedo attack was ordered, it was to be led by a scout cruiser, supported by two destroyers to repel any enemy torpedo boats. A group of four to six torpedo boats would deliver the attack under the direction of the flotilla commander. On 9 December 1915, 87 F, two other 250t-class boats, two Kaiman-class torpedo boats and three destroyers accompanied the protected cruiser Szigetvár to escort Austro-Hungarian seaplanes attacking Ancona. Five days later, Szigetvár led a similar seaplane raid on Rimini, escorted by two destroyers, two Kaiman-class boats, and three 250t-class boats including 87 F.

On 14 January 1916, 87 F laid mines in the Gulf of Triest. On 2 February 87 F, two other 250t-class boats and the Huszár-class destroyer Wildfang were sent from the main Austro-Hungarian naval base at Pola – in the northern Adriatic – to the Bocche escorting the armoured cruiser Sankt Georg and the scout cruiser Helgoland. The following day this group of vessels conducted a shore bombardment operation against the Italian coast near San Vito Chietino, including the railway line between Ortona and Tollo. During this operation, Sankt Georg exchanged fire with an Italian armed train operated by the Royal Italian Navy (Italian: Regia Marina), equipped with 4.7 in (12 cm) guns. On 6 February, Helgoland, 87 F and five other 250t-class boats were sent to intercept the British light cruiser HMS Liverpool and Italian Rosolino Pilo-class destroyer Pilade Bronzetti which had attacked Wildfang while she was escorting a seaplane raid. Instead of meeting the pair that had forced Wildfang to retreat, the Austro-Hungarian force encountered the British light cruiser HMS Weymouth and French Bouclier-class destroyer Bouclier – which had since relieved them – north of Durazzo in Albania. The torpedo boats manoeuvred into two groups of three for the attack, but in one of the groups two leading boats collided, with one sustaining damage, forcing that group to retreat to the port of Budva in Austro-Hungarian-occupied Montenegro, and the other group pressed their attack unsuccessfully. The entire Austro-Hungarian force then returned to the Bocche, having lost an opportunity to interdict significant convoy traffic further south between Albania and Italy.

On 4/5 July 1916, Helgoland led an unproductive raid on the Otranto Barrage, the Allied naval blockade of the Strait of Otranto, escorted by three destroyers, 87 F, and 85 F. On the night of 8/9 July, the scout cruiser Novara led 87 F and two Kaiman-class boats in a more successful raid on the barrage which resulted in the sinking of two drifters, damage to two more, and the capture of nine crew as prisoners of war. The force was chased by Italian destroyers, but escaped with the assistance of Austro-Hungarian seaplanes from the Bocche that attacked the Italian ships. On 15 August, 87 F joined 85 F and two destroyers to search for the missing seaplane L 87, which was located and towed to the Bocche the following day. On 28 August, a large force led by Sankt Georg, the armoured cruiser Kaiser Karl VI, Novara and Helgoland, escorted by five destroyers, 87 F and three other 250t-class boats, steamed to the Italian coast in an attempt to draw Italian ships into a trap set with four Austro-Hungarian u-boats. The Italians did not detect the Austro-Hungarian ships due to fog, and the operation was a failure. On 23 September, 87 along with two other 250t-class boats and a Kaiman-class boat laid mines outside the port of Durazzo. On the night of 4/5 October, 87 F and two other 250t-class boats steamed to the barrage but located no targets. On 4 November 1916, three Italian destroyers and three torpedo boats were involved in a brief encounter in the northern Adriatic with two Austro-Hungarian destroyers accompanied by 87 F and two other 250t-class boats. The following day, the same three torpedo boats conducted a shore bombardment of Sant'Elpidio a Mare while en route to Pola which resulted in an artillery duel with an Italian armoured train.

In 1917, one of 87 F's 66 mm guns may have been placed on an anti-aircraft mount. According to the naval historian Zvonimir Freivogel, sources vary on whether these mounts were added to all boats of the class, and on whether these mounts were added to the forward or aft gun. On 21 May 1917, the suffix of all Austro-Hungarian torpedo boats was removed, and thereafter they were referred to only by the numeral. On 25 May, as part of a force that included six destroyers and five other torpedo boats, 87 undertook a scouting mission along the Italian coast without meeting any Allied vessels. On 18 October, 87 and five of her 250t-class sisters joined three destroyers and three seaplanes in escorting three steamers towing 32 boats from Pola to Pirano to reinforce Austro-Hungarian forces on the Italian front ahead of the forthcoming Battle of Caporetto in which the Italian forces were routed. On 28 October, 87 and four other 250t-class boats escorted the scout cruiser Admiral Spaun from Đenovići in the Bocche to Triest. The following day she was tasked to sweep mines between Sistiana – a village northwest of Triest – and the mouth of the Sdobba River which discharges the Isonzo into the Adriatic. The next day, 87 along with other 250t-class boats she escorted the Admiral Spaun in an attack on the harbour of Grado between Venice and Triest. The next day, along with the Admiral Spaun and five other 250t-class boats, 87 supported the landing of the "Young Riflemen" from Triest at newly captured Grado. With cover from two destroyers, 87 and seven other torpedo boats were laying mines between Venice and Ancona – to disrupt the Italian withdrawal from the Isonzo Front – on 19 November when they were intercepted by four Italian destroyers, but managed to escape. On 28 November, a number of 250t-class boats were involved in two shore bombardment missions. In the second mission, 87 joined seven other 250t-class boats and six destroyers for the bombardment of Porto Corsini, Marotta and Cesenatico. On 7 December, 87 and 78 were part of a patrol alongside four destroyers when they were tasked to retrieve the seaplane K219 which had undergone a forced landing in waters off Ancona, but while under tow by 87 the seaplane capsized and had to be scuttled. During 1917, 87 conducted a further seven support missions for seaplane raids, three minesweeping tasks, and escorted ten convoys.

On 4 February 1918, 87 and two of her sisters accompanied four destroyers on a mission supporting seaplanes attacking the air station at Venice. 87 retrieved the seaplane K210 which had been forced landed off the west Istrian town of Umago on 1 May. By 1918, the Allies had strengthened their ongoing blockade on the Strait of Otranto, as foreseen by the Austro-Hungarian Navy. As a result, it was becoming more difficult for the German and Austro-Hungarian U-boats to get through the strait and into the Mediterranean Sea. In response to these blockades, the new commander of the Austro-Hungarian Navy, Konteradmiral Miklós Horthy, decided to launch an attack on the Allied defenders with battleships, scout cruisers, and destroyers. During the night of 8 June, Horthy left Pola in the upper Adriatic with the dreadnought battleships Viribus Unitis and Prinz Eugen. At about 23:00 on 9 June 1918, after some difficulties getting the harbour defence barrage opened, the dreadnoughts Szent István and Tegetthoff, escorted by one destroyer and six torpedo boats, including 87, also departed Pola and set course for Slano, north of Ragusa, to rendezvous with Horthy in preparation for a coordinated attack on the Otranto Barrage. About 03:15 on 10 June, (Note: Sources differ on what the exact time was when the attack took place. Sieche states that the time was 3:15 am when the Szent István was hit, while Sokol claims that the time was 3:30 am.) while returning from an uneventful patrol off the Dalmatian coast, two Royal Italian Navy (Italian: Regia Marina) MAS boats, MAS 15 and MAS 21, spotted the smoke from the Austrian ships. Both boats successfully penetrated the escort screen and split to engage the dreadnoughts individually. MAS 21 attacked Tegetthoff, but her torpedoes missed. Under the command of Luigi Rizzo, MAS 15 fired two torpedoes at 03:25, both of which hit Szent István. Both boats evaded pursuit. The torpedo hits on Szent István were abreast her boiler rooms, which flooded, knocking out power to the pumps. Szent István capsized less than three hours after being torpedoed. In the aftermath of the sinking, 87 rescued 113 of Szent István's crew. This disaster essentially ended major Austro-Hungarian fleet operations in the Adriatic for the remaining months of the war.

On 18 July, conducted an anti-submarine mission near the islet of Porer south of the Istrian peninsula, and on 12 August she was sent south to the Bocche. On 26 September, 87 was one of four 250t-class boats that assisted two destroyers escorting three steamers when they were attacked off Cape Menders (current day Cape Mendra near Ulcinj, Montenegro) by the British submarine H1. Three days later, 87 along with 82, 93, 96 and the Ersatz Triglav-class destroyers Lika, Dukla and Uzsok laid mines in the Bay of Drim off northern Albania. On 2 October, 87 was at Durazzo in Albania when the port was bombarded by a multinational Allied naval force. The only other Austro-Hungarian warships in port were the destroyers Dinara and Scharfschutze, and they were seriously outnumbered and outgunned by the Allied force, which included seven cruisers and eleven destroyers. 87 escaped with minor damage when she was struck by a torpedo that failed to detonate, but damaged her hull and caused her to start taking on water. The Allied force withdrew after the Austro-Hungarian submarine SM U-31 hit and damaged Weymouth with a torpedo. 87 was withdrawn to Pola for repairs. This was the last major action involving the Austro-Hungarian Navy. During 1918, 87 conducted a further six minesweeping tasks, 49 convoy escorts and several anti-submarine patrols.

=== Interwar period ===
87 survived the war intact. In 1920, under the terms of the previous year's Treaty of Saint-Germain-en-Laye by which rump Austria officially ended World War I, she was allocated to the Kingdom of Serbs, Croats and Slovenes (KSCS, later Yugoslavia). Along with three other 250t-class F-group boats, 93, 96 and 97, and four 250t-class T-group boats, she served with the Royal Yugoslav Navy (Serbo-Croatian Latin: Kraljevska Mornarica, KM; Краљевска Морнарица). Transferred in March 1921, in KM service, 87 was renamed T5. When the navy was formed, she and the other seven 250t-class boats were the only modern sea-going vessels in the KM. During the French occupation of Cattaro, the original torpedo tubes were destroyed or damaged, and new ones of the same size were ordered from the Nejedil factory in Czechoslovakia. In KM service it was intended to replace one or both guns on each boat of the 250t class with a longer Škoda 66 mm (2.6 in) L/45 gun, and it is believed that this included the forward gun on T5. She was also fitted with two Zbrojovka 15 mm (0.59 in) machine guns. In KM service, the crew increased to 52, and she was commissioned in 1923.

In 1925, exercises were conducted off the Dalmatian coast, involving the majority of the navy. In May and June 1929, six of the eight 250t-class torpedo boats – including T5 – accompanied the light cruiser Dalmacija, the submarine tender Hvar and the submarines Hrabri and Nebojša, on a cruise to Malta, the Greek island of Corfu in the Ionian Sea, and Bizerte in the French protectorate of Tunisia. The ships and crews made a very good impression while visiting Malta. In 1932, the British naval attaché reported that Yugoslav ships engaged in few exercises, manoeuvres or gunnery training due to reduced budgets. By 1939, the maximum speed achieved by the 250t class in Yugoslav service had declined to 24 kn (44 km/h; 28 mph).

=== World War II and post-war service ===
In April 1941, Yugoslavia entered World War II when it was invaded by the German-led Axis powers. At the time of the invasion, T5 was assigned to the 3rd Torpedo Division located at Šibenik, which also included her sisters T3, T6 and T7. On the first day of the invasion, 6 April, they were anchored across the entrance of the St. Anthony Channel that links Šibenik Bay to the Adriatic, on a line between Jadrija on the northern side of the channel and Zablaće on the southern side, when aircraft of the Regia Aeronautica (Italian Royal Air Force) attacked Šibenik. On the same day, Kapetan bojnog broda (Note: Kapetan bojnog broda in the KM was equivalent to a contemporary British Royal Navy captain.) Ivan Kern arrived to take command of the division, and the four boats sailed up the channel towards Šibenik then north to Zaton where they were again attacked unsuccessfully by Italian bombers. T3 incurred boiler damage and was sent south to Primošten for repairs to be undertaken.

On 8 April more unsuccessful Italian air attacks on the three boats occurred, and the only effective anti-aircraft gun between them – the 40 mm (1.6 in) gun on T6 – malfunctioned. The three vessels then sailed east across Lake Prokljan to Skradin where the population begged them to leave the harbour to avoid the town being bombed by the Italians. Their request was rebuffed, and during an Italian bombing raid some of the boats along with the water carrier Perun were slightly damaged. On the following morning, Italian aircraft attempted to sink Perun using aerial torpedoes, but all missed. In response, Kern ordered T6 to escort Perun to the Bay of Kotor, and the two vessels arrived there the next day without incident, where T6's malfunctioning gun was repaired and she was loaded with weapons, supplies and extra men and sent to Šibenik. On the return journey she stopped at Makarska and learned of the declaration of the creation of the Axis puppet fascist state, the Independent State of Croatia (NDH). On the same day, the division, along with other vessels, were tasked to support an attack on the Italian enclave of Zara on the Dalmatian coast, which was quickly cancelled as soon as the establishment of the NDH was declared. On the evening of 11 April, T6 met with T5 and the rest of the division near Šibenik. Kern ordered her to deliver her load to Šibenik then meet the rest of the division at Milna on the island of Brač, which she did on 12 April. Kern was unable to obtain orders from Šibenik Command by telephone, so took the Uskok-class torpedo boat Uskok to try to obtain some. His second-in-command was unable to maintain order, and a third of the crews deserted. When Kern returned, he gave orders to sail to the Bay of Kotor, but the crews of the division refused to follow his orders. He retrieved his personal gear from T7 and taking command of Uskok, sailed to the Bay of Kotor. Eventually Kern fled into exile with other KM vessels. On 13 April, the Orjen-class torpedo boat Triglav arrived with orders that the division should return to Šibenik to evacuate the staff of Šibenik Command. The first order was complied with, but upon arrival at Šibenik the boat crews were given the choice of returning to their homes or sailing to Split to join the NDH navy. The boats then sailed to nearby Divulje, to follow through on an intention to join NDH navy, but all four boats of the division were then captured by the Italians.

T5 was then operated by the Italians under her Yugoslav designation, conducting coastal, second-line escort, and anti-Partisan duties in the Adriatic. Her main guns were replaced by two 76.2 mm (3.00 in) L/30 anti-aircraft guns, she was fitted with one or two Breda 20 mm (0.79 in) L/65 anti-aircraft guns, her bridge was enclosed, and one pair of torpedo tubes may have also been removed. She was also painted in a camouflage pattern. According to Italian records, in February 1942, T5 and her sister T6 (ex-93 F then 93) chased an Allied submarine between Split and the island of Mulo near Primošten, but there is no record of this incident in British records. On 8 October 1942, T5 was escorting the coastal steamship Giuseppe Magliulo when they were unsuccessfully attacked by the British submarine HMS Safari near Cape Planka. On 28 December 1942, the Partisans established their first naval station at Podgora on the Dalmatian coast. From this base, the fledgling Partisan Navy attacked and captured five coastal steamships over the next few days. On 1 January 1943, T5, along with two captured Yugoslav Arbe-class minelayers, a patrol vessel and an armed tug, attacked Podgora from the sea, and an Italian landing party was put ashore. The Italian troops were repelled by the Partisan 4th Dalmatian Brigade. The operation was repeated three days later, with the addition of air support, but a planned second landing was cancelled. On 12 February, T5 was escorting a convoy of four coastal steamers near Cape Planka when HMS Thunderbolt unsuccessfully attacked the group.

About 18:00 on 10 September 1943, at the time of the Italian capitulation, T5, the sub-chaser Ernesto Giovannini, and several smaller vessels escaped from Split. The commander of Maridalmazia (the maritime command of Dalmatia), Ammiraglio di divisione (Note: Ammiraglio di divisione in the Regia Marina was equivalent to a contemporary British Royal Navy vice admiral.) Antonio Bobbiese, along with his staff, escaped from Split on board a motor boat and when he arrived at the island of Susak off the northern Adriatic coast, he took overT5. The boat reached the island of Lastovo west of Dubrovnik and on the evening of 13 September sailed in a convoy to Brindisi in Italy, docking there at midday the following day. Bobbiese was strongly reprimanded for leaving his command prematurely. T5 was sent to Malta and returned to the KM-in-exile on 7 December, but was not considered operational and thus survived the war.

T5 was commissioned as Cer by the new Yugoslav Navy after the war, initially as a stražarski brod (guard ship) with the designation SBR 92. She was later reclassified as a patrolni brod (patrol ship) with the designation PBR 92. Her post-war fit-out included replacing her guns with two semi-automatic Škoda 40 mm L/67 anti-aircraft guns on single mounts, one quadruple and one twin mount of Flakvierling 38 20 mm (0.79 in) guns, and one set of torpedo tubes were removed. She was fitted with two depth charge racks. In JRM service her maximum speed was 22 kn (41 km/h; 25 mph), her range amounted to 1,100 nmi (2,000 km; 1,300 mi) at 12 kn (22 km/h; 14 mph), and she had a crew of 52. Cer was allocated to the JRM's 6th Division, which largely consisted of escort destroyers, and was also employed in a training role, until she was stricken off the naval register in 1963. She was then towed to the Brodospas scrapyard at Split to be broken up.

== See also ==
- List of ships of the Royal Yugoslav Navy
- List of ships of the Yugoslav Navy
