= Yugoslav torpedo boat T7 =

Sea-going torpedo boat operated by the Royal Yugoslav Navy

T7
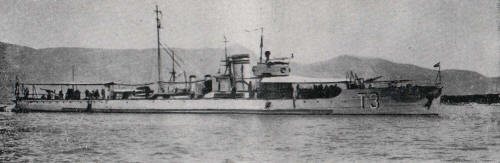
- T7's sister ship, T3. The only significant external difference was that T7 had two funnels.

History

Austria-Hungary
- Name: 96 F then 96
- Builder: Ganz & Danubius
- Laid down: 24 February 1915
- Launched: 8 July 1916
- Commissioned: 10 November 1916
- Out of service: 1918
- Fate: Assigned to the Kingdom of Serbs, Croats and Slovenes

Kingdom of Yugoslavia
- Name: T7
- Acquired: March 1921
- Out of service: April 1941
- Fate: Captured by Italian Royal Navy

Italy
- Name: T7
- Acquired: April 1941
- Out of service: September 1943

Independent State of Croatia
- Name: T7
- Acquired: early 1944
- Fate: Run aground by British MTB/MGBs on 24 June 1944 and then destroyed

General characteristics
- Class & type: 250t-class, F-group sea-going torpedo boat
- Displacement: 243.9 t (240 long tons); 267 t (263 long tons) (full load)
- Length: 58.76 m (192 ft 9 in)
- Beam: 5.84 m (19 ft 2 in)
- Draught: 1.5 m (4 ft 11 in)
- Installed power: 5,000–6,000 shp (3,700–4,500 kW); 2 × Yarrow water-tube boilers
- Propulsion: 2 × shafts; 2 × AEG-Curtis steam turbines
- Speed: 28–29 kn (52–54 km/h; 32–33 mph)
- Range: 1,200 nmi (2,200 km; 1,400 mi) at 16 kn (30 km/h; 18 mph)
- Complement: 41
- Armament: 2 × Škoda 66 mm (2.6 in) L/30 guns; 4 × 450 mm (17.7 in) torpedo tubes; 1 × 8 mm (0.31 in) machine gun; 10–12 naval mines

T7 was a sea-going torpedo boat operated by the Royal Yugoslav Navy between 1921 and 1941. Originally 96 F, a 250t-class torpedo boat of the Austro-Hungarian Navy built in 1915–1916, she was armed with two 66 mm (2.6 in) guns and four 450 mm (17.7 in) torpedo tubes, and could carry 10–12 naval mines. She saw active service during World War I, performing convoy escort, patrol, and minesweeping tasks, and anti-submarine operations. In 1917 the suffixes of all Austro-Hungarian torpedo boats were removed, and thereafter she was referred to as 96.

Following Austria-Hungary's defeat in 1918, 96 was allocated to the Navy of the Kingdom of Serbs, Croats and Slovenes, which later became the Royal Yugoslav Navy, and was renamed T7. At the time, she and the seven other 250t-class boats were the only modern sea-going vessels of the fledgling maritime force. During the interwar period, T7 and the rest of the navy were involved in training exercises and cruises to friendly ports, but activity was limited by reduced naval budgets. The boat was captured by the Italians during the German-led Axis invasion of Yugoslavia in April 1941. After her main armament was modernised, she served with the Royal Italian Navy under her Yugoslav designation, conducting coastal and second-line escort duties in the Adriatic Sea. Following the Italian capitulation in September 1943, she was handed over by the Germans to the Navy of the Independent State of Croatia. While sailing to Rijeka for a refit, she was attacked and driven aground by British Royal Navy small high-speed craft in June 1944 and then destroyed by the British Army to prevent her salvage. She was broken up in situ in 1953.

== Background ==
In 1910, the Austria-Hungary Naval Technical Committee initiated the design and development of a 275-tonne (271-long-ton) coastal torpedo boat, specifying that it should be capable of sustaining 30 knots (56 km/h; 35 mph) for 10 hours. At the same time, the committee issued design parameters for a high seas or fleet torpedo boat of 500–550 t (490–540 long tons), top speed of 30 kn and endurance of 480 nautical miles (890 km; 550 mi). This design would have been a larger and better-armed vessel than the existing Austro-Hungarian 400-tonne (390-long-ton) Huszár-class destroyers. The specification for the high seas torpedo boat was based on an expectation that the Strait of Otranto, where the Adriatic Sea meets the Ionian Sea, would be blockaded by hostile forces during a future conflict. In such circumstances, there would be a need for a torpedo boat that could sail from the Austro-Hungarian Navy (German: kaiserliche und königliche Kriegsmarine, Hungarian: Császári és Királyi Haditengerészet) base at the Bocche di Cattaro (the Bocche or Bay of Kotor) to the strait during the night, locate and attack blockading ships and return to port before morning. Steam turbine power was selected for propulsion, as diesels with the necessary power were not available, and the Austro-Hungarian Navy did not have the practical experience to run turbo-electric boats. Despite having developed these ideas, the Austro-Hungarian Navy then asked shipyards to submit proposals for a 250 t (250-long-ton) boat with a maximum speed of 28 kn (52 km/h; 32 mph). Stabilimento Tecnico Triestino (STT) of Trieste was selected for the contract to build the first eight vessels, designated as the T-group. Another tender was requested for four more boats, but when Ganz & Danubius reduced their price by ten per cent, a total of sixteen boats were ordered from them, designated the F-group. The F-group designation signified the location of Ganz & Danubius' main shipyard at Fiume.

== Description and construction ==
The 250t-class F-group boats had short raised forecastles and an open bridge, and were fast and agile, well designed for service in the Adriatic. They had a waterline length of 58.76 metres (192 ft 9 in), a beam of 5.84 m (19 ft 2 in), and a normal draught of 1.5 m (4 ft 11 in). While their designed displacement was 243.9 t (240 long tons), they displaced 267 tonnes (263 long tons) fully loaded. The boats were powered by two AEG-Curtis steam turbines driving two propellers, using steam generated by two Yarrow water-tube boilers, one of which burned fuel oil and the other coal. There were two boiler rooms, one behind the other. The turbines were rated at 5,000 shaft horsepower (3,700 kW) with a maximum output of 6,000 shp (4,500 kW) and were designed to propel the boats to a top speed of 28–29 kn (52–54 km/h; 32–33 mph). They carried 20.2 tonnes (19.9 long tons) of coal and 31 tonnes (30.5 long tons) of fuel oil, which gave them a range of 1,200 nautical miles (2,200 km; 1,400 mi) at 16 kn (30 km/h; 18 mph). The F-group had two funnels rather than the single funnel of the T-group. 79 T and the rest of the 250t class were classified as high seas torpedo boats by the Austro-Hungarian Navy, despite being smaller than the original concept for a coastal torpedo boat. The naval historian Zvonimir Freivogel states that this type of situation was common due to the parsimony of the Austro-Hungarian Navy. They were the first small Austro-Hungarian Navy boats to use turbines, and this contributed to ongoing problems with them, which had to be progressively solved once they were in service. The crew consisted of three officers and thirty-eight enlisted men. The vessel carried one 4 m (13 ft) yawl as a ship's boat.

The boats were armed with two Škoda 66 mm (2.6 in) L/30 (Note: L/30 denotes the length of the gun's barrel. In this case, the L/30 gun is 30 calibre, meaning that the barrel was 30 times as long as the diameter of its bore.) guns, with the forward gun mounted on the forecastle, and the aft gun on the quarterdeck. A 40 cm (16 in) searchlight was mounted above the bridge. They were also armed with four 450 mm (17.7 in) torpedo tubes mounted in pairs, with one pair mounted between the forecastle and bridge, and the other aft of the mainmast. One 8 mm (0.31 in) Schwarzlose M.7/12 machine gun was carried for anti-aircraft work. Four mounting points were installed so that the machine gun could be mounted in the most effective position depending on the expected direction of attack. The boat could also carry 10–12 naval mines.

96 F was the second-to-last of the F-group to be completed, and was laid down at Ganz-Danubius' shipyard at Porto Re on 24 February 1915, launched on 8 July 1916 and commissioned at Ganz-Danubius' main shipyard at Fiume on 10 November of that year.

== Career ==
=== World War I ===
The original concept of operation for the 250t-class boats was that they would sail in a flotilla at the rear of a cruising battle formation, and were to intervene in fighting only if the battleships around which the formation was established were disabled, or in order to attack damaged enemy battleships. When a torpedo attack was ordered, it was to be led by a scout cruiser, supported by two destroyers to repel any enemy torpedo boats. A group of four to six torpedo boats would deliver the attack under the direction of the flotilla commander.

In 1917, one of 96 F's 66 mm guns may have been placed on an anti-aircraft mount. According to the naval historian Zvonimir Freivogel, sources vary on whether these mounts were added to all boats of the class, and on whether these mounts were added to the forward or aft gun. On 12–13 March, 96 F conducted an anti-submarine patrol between the islands of Olib and Silba off the northern Dalmatian coast. She escorted the armoured cruiser Kaiser Karl VI from the Bay of Telašćica on the island of Isola Lunga to the main Austro-Hungarian Navy base at Pola in the northern Adriatic on 1 May. On 11 May, the British submarine HMS H1 stalked 96 F's T-group sister ship 78 T off Pola, firing two torpedoes at her. The British captain had kept his submarine's periscope extended too far and for too long, and the tell-tale "feather" had alerted the crew of 78 T, allowing her crew to avoid the incoming torpedoes. 96 F, 78 T and 93 F, accompanied by the Huszár-class destroyer Csikós, unsuccessfully pursued the British submarine. That night, Csikós, 96 F, 78 T and 93 F were pursued and briefly engaged in the northern Adriatic by a force of Italian destroyers consisting of Animoso, Audace, Ardito, Ardente and Giuseppe Cesare Abba but the Austro-Hungarian force was able to retire to safety behind a minefield. On 21 May, the suffix of all Austro-Hungarian torpedo boats was removed, and thereafter they were referred to only by the numeral. From 19 to 24 May, 96 provided cover for the salvage of the Austro-Hungarian submarine SM U-5 after it had been sunk by a mine. On 3 June, the Huszár-class destroyers Wildfang and Csikós, along with 96 and another 250t-class boat, had a brief encounter with three Italian MAS boats off the mouth of the Tagliamento river in the far north of the Adriatic.

On 3–4 June, 96, along with 93, and Csikós, Wildfang and their sister ship Velebit were returning from a seaplane support mission when Wildfang struck a mine and sank about 30 nmi (56 km; 35 mi) southwest of the Pinida lighthouse on the eastern coast of Istria, with 96 assisting with the rescue of 25 of her 74 surviving crew. In June and July, Austro-Hungarian aircraft were constantly in action bombing various targets along the east coast of Italy. On a twenty-one seaplane raid targeting the harbour at Grado between Venice and Triest, and the main railway hub in the same area at Cervignano, 96 was part of the covering force which also included the Huszár-class destroyers Scharfschutze, Turul and Dinara, and the 250t-class boats 76, 80 and 92. Turul was targeted by an enemy submarine, but evaded the torpedo. From 18 August, 96 was based at Đenovići in the Bocche. On 29 November, 96, 83, 97 and Csikós were escorting the steamer Dalmatia when the convoy was attacked by a submarine just west of the mouth of the Bojana river, which forms the border between Montenegro and Albania. All four torpedoes missed.

On 1 February 1918, a mutiny broke out among the sailors of some vessels of the Austro-Hungarian Navy at the Đenovići anchorage within the Bocche, largely over poor food, lack of replacement uniforms and supplies, and insufficient leave, although the poor state of the Austro-Hungarian economy and its impact on their families was also a factor. 96 was based at Đenovići at the time, and initially her crew was indecisive about joining the revolt, which was suppressed the following day. On 17 March, 96 was supporting a seaplane reconnaissance mission, when the seaplane A87 was forced to land off Muzil near Venice, and 96 towed the aircraft to Pola. On 4 April, 96 towed a launch carrying a detachment of sailors from Pola to near Ancona, with the mission of landing and capturing one or more Italian MAS motor torpedo boats, but the sailors were landed too far north of Ancona, their beached launch was discovered by an Italian airship and towed to Ancona, and two of the sailors defected. The mission failed and the sailors were captured.

By 1918, the Allies had strengthened their ongoing blockade on the Strait of Otranto, as foreseen by the Austro-Hungarian Navy. As a result, it was becoming more difficult for the German and Austro-Hungarian U-boats to get through the strait and into the Mediterranean Sea. In response to these blockades, the new commander of the Austro-Hungarian Navy, Konteradmiral Miklós Horthy, decided to launch an attack on the Allied defenders with battleships, scout cruisers, and destroyers. During the night of 8 June, Horthy left Pola in the upper Adriatic with the dreadnought battleships Viribus Unitis and Prinz Eugen, with an escort that included 96. At about 23:00 on 9 June 1918, after some difficulties getting the harbour defence barrage opened, the dreadnoughts Szent István and Tegetthoff, with an escort force, also departed Pola and set course for Slano, north of Ragusa, to rendezvous with Horthy in preparation for a coordinated attack on the Otranto Barrage. About 03:15 on 10 June, (Note: Sources differ on what the exact time was when the attack took place. Sieche states that the time was 3:15 am when the Szent István was hit, while Sokol claims that the time was 3:30 am.) while returning from an uneventful patrol off the Dalmatian coast, two Royal Italian Navy (Italian: Regia Marina) MAS boats, MAS 15 and MAS 21, spotted the smoke from the Austrian ships. Both boats successfully penetrated the escort screen and split to engage the dreadnoughts individually. MAS 21 attacked Tegetthoff, but her torpedoes missed. Under the command of Luigi Rizzo, MAS 15 fired two torpedoes at 03:25, both of which hit Szent István. Both boats evaded pursuit. The torpedo hits on Szent István were abreast her boiler rooms, which flooded, knocking out power to the pumps. Szent István capsized less than three hours after being torpedoed. This disaster essentially ended major Austro-Hungarian fleet operations in the Adriatic for the remaining months of the war. On 11 June, 96's sister 91 stranded on the Pelješac peninsula in southern Dalmatia, and 96 towed her to Pola.

On 15 September, 96 was transferred south to the Bocche. On 26 September, she escorted a convoy of three coastal steamers from the Bocche to Durazzo, accompanied by 79, 87, 89, Dinara, Scharfschutze and their sister Reka. The steamers were attacked by the British submarine H1 but it was driven off by the escorts. Three days later, 96 along with 93, 82, 87 and the Ersatz Triglav-class destroyers Lika, Dukla and Uzsok laid mines in the Bay of Drim off northern Albania. On 6 October, 96 laid mines off Durazzo. On 19 October, 96 escorted two coastal steamers to San Giovanni di Medua in Albania and Antivari in Montenegro, accompanied by 76, 87, 89 and the Huszár-class destroyer Pandur. As the end of the war approached and the Austro-Hungarian Empire broke apart, on 1 November 96 was ceded to the State of Slovenes, Croats and Serbs, which was a short-lived fragment of the empire which united with the Kingdom of Serbia and Kingdom of Montenegro on 1 December, becoming the Kingdom of Serbs, Croats and Slovenes (from 1929, the Kingdom of Yugoslavia).

=== Interwar period ===
The Austro-Hungarian Empire sued for peace in November 1918, and 96 survived the war intact. Immediately after the Austro-Hungarian capitulation, French troops occupied the Bocche, which was treated by the Allies as Austro-Hungarian territory. During the French occupation, the captured Austro-Hungarian Navy ships moored at the Bocche were neglected, and 96's original torpedo tubes were destroyed or damaged by French troops. In 1920, under the terms of the previous year's Treaty of Saint-Germain-en-Laye by which rump Austria officially ended World War I, 96 was allocated to the Kingdom of Serbs, Croats and Slovenes. Along with 87, 93 and 97, and four 250t-class T-group boats, she served with the Royal Yugoslav Navy (Serbo-Croatian Latin: Kraljevska Mornarica, KM; Краљевска Морнарица). Transferred in March 1921, in KM service, 96 was renamed T7. When the navy was formed, she and the other seven 250t-class boats were the only modern sea-going vessels in the KM. New torpedo tubes of the same size were ordered from the Strojne Tovarne factory in Ljubljana. In KM service it was intended to replace one or both guns on each boat of the 250t class with a longer Škoda 66 mm (2.6 in) L/45 gun, and it is believed that this included the forward gun on T7. She was also fitted with two Zbrojovka 15 mm (0.59 in) machine guns. In KM service, the crew increased to 52, and she was commissioned in 1923.

In 1925, exercises were conducted off the Dalmatian coast, involving the majority of the navy. In May and June 1929, six of the eight 250t-class torpedo boats – including T7 – accompanied the light cruiser Dalmacija, the submarine tender Hvar and the submarines Hrabri and Nebojša, on a cruise to Malta, the Greek island of Corfu in the Ionian Sea, and Bizerte in the French protectorate of Tunisia. The ships and crews made a very good impression while visiting Malta. In 1932, the British naval attaché reported that Yugoslav ships engaged in few exercises, manoeuvres or gunnery training due to reduced budgets. By 1939, the maximum speed achieved by the 250t class in Yugoslav service had declined to 24 kn (44 km/h; 28 mph).

=== World War II ===
In April 1941, Yugoslavia entered World War II when it was invaded by the German-led Axis powers. At the time of the invasion, T7 was assigned to the 3rd Torpedo Division located at Šibenik, which also included her sisters T3, T5 and T6. On the first day of the invasion, 6 April, they were anchored across the entrance of the St. Anthony Channel that links Šibenik Bay to the Adriatic, on a line between Jadrija on the northern side of the channel and Zablaće on the southern side, when aircraft of the Regia Aeronautica (Italian Royal Air Force) attacked Šibenik. On the same day, Kapetan bojnog broda (Note: Kapetan bojnog broda in the KM was equivalent to a contemporary British Royal Navy captain.) Ivan Kern arrived to take command of the division and chose T7 as his flagship. The four boats sailed up the channel towards Šibenik then north to Zaton where they were again attacked unsuccessfully by Italian bombers. T3 incurred boiler damage and was sent south to Primošten for repairs to be undertaken.

On 8 April more unsuccessful Italian air attacks on the three boats occurred, and the only effective anti-aircraft gun between them – the 40 mm (1.6 in) gun on T6 – malfunctioned. The three vessels then sailed east across Lake Prokljan to Skradin where the population begged them to leave the harbour to avoid the town being bombed by the Italians. Their request was rebuffed, and during an Italian bombing raid some of the boats along with the water carrier Perun were slightly damaged. On the following morning, Italian aircraft attempted to sink Perun using aerial torpedoes, but all missed. In response, Kern ordered T6 to escort Perun to the Bay of Kotor, and the two vessels arrived there the next day without incident, where T6's malfunctioning gun was repaired and she was loaded with weapons, supplies and extra men and sent to Šibenik. On the return journey she stopped at Makarska and learned of the declaration of the creation of the Axis puppet fascist state, the Independent State of Croatia (NDH). On the same day, the division, along with other vessels, were tasked to support an attack on the Italian enclave of Zara on the Dalmatian coast, which was quickly cancelled as soon as the establishment of the NDH was declared. On the evening of 11 April, T6 met with T7 and the rest of the division near Šibenik. Kern ordered T6 to deliver her load to Šibenik then meet the rest of the division at Milna on the island of Brač, which she did on 12 April. Kern was unable to obtain orders from Šibenik Command by telephone, so took the Uskok-class torpedo boat Uskok to try to obtain some. His second-in-command was unable to maintain order, and a third of the crews deserted. When Kern returned, he gave orders to sail to the Bay of Kotor, but the crews of the division refused to follow his orders. He retrieved his personal gear from T7 and taking command of Uskok, sailed to the Bay of Kotor. Eventually Kern fled into exile with other KM vessels. On 13 April, the Orjen-class torpedo boat Triglav arrived with orders that the division should return to Šibenik to evacuate the staff of Šibenik Command. The first order was complied with, but upon arrival at Šibenik the boat crews were given the choice of returning to their homes or sailing to Split to join the nascent Navy of the Independent State of Croatia. The boats then sailed to nearby Divulje, to follow through on an intention to join the NDH navy, but all four boats of the division were then captured by the Italians.

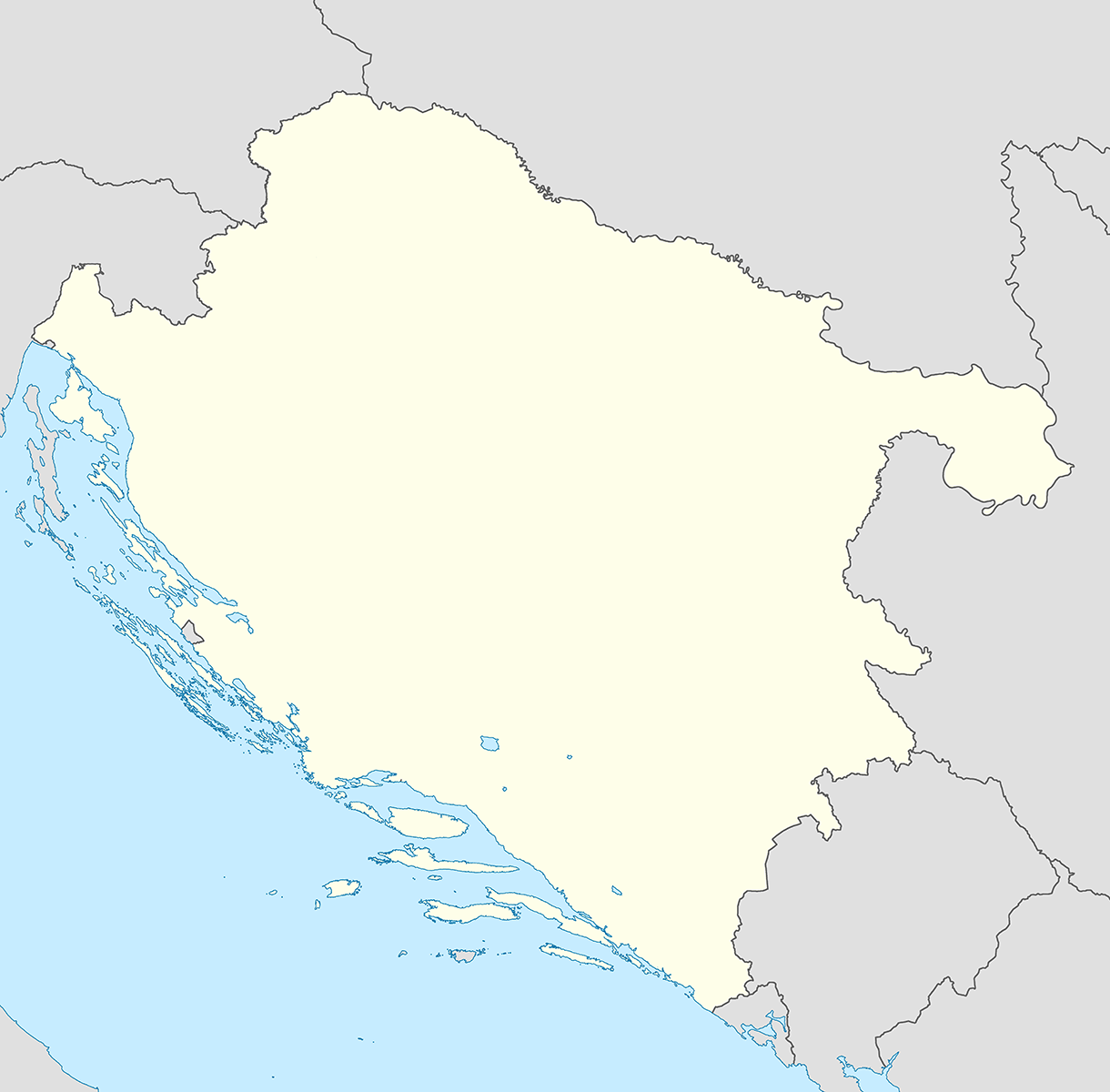
Map of the Independent State of Croatia showing the location of Murter Island

T7 was then operated by the Italians under her Yugoslav designation, conducting coastal, second-line escort, and anti-Partisan duties in the Adriatic. Her main guns were replaced by two 76.2 mm (3 in) L/30 anti-aircraft guns, she was fitted with one or two Breda 20 mm (0.79 in) L/65 anti-aircraft guns, her bridge was enclosed, and one pair of torpedo tubes may have also been removed. In Italian hands, her crew was increased to 64. She was allocated to Maridalmazia, the military maritime command of Dalmatia (Comando militare maritime della Dalmatia), which was responsible for the area from the northern Adriatic island of Premuda south to the port of Bar (formerly Antivari) in the Italian governorate of Montenegro. T7 was captured at Šibenik when the Italians capitulated in September 1943, and once under German control, it was initially intended for her to remain so with the new designation of TA34 (German: Torpedoboot Ausland 34), (Note: The term Ausland and prefix TA were used to denote that she was a captured vessel put into German service.) although this designation does not appear to have been formally applied and she continued to be referred to as T7. On 10 October, T7 was still located at Šibenik, was rated as "operational", and her maximum speed was recorded as 18 kn (33 km/h; 21 mph). In February 1944 it was decided that T7 would be transferred from Šibenik to Rijeka (formerly Fiume) for a refit. It was then decided that T7 would be handed over to the NDH navy and a Croatian crew was allocated prior to her transfer to Rijeka and the planned refit. It seems unlikely that her armament was modified before the handover, although one set of torpedo tubes may have been removed. On the night of 13/14 June, eleven crew members defected to the Partisans after their plan to take the boat with them was discovered. The remaining crew were detained, a fresh crew was brought aboard, and the voyage to Rijeka was set for the night of 24 June. The commander of the Šibenik Naval District, Kapetan fregate (Note: Kapetan fregate in the NDH navy was equivalent to a contemporary British Royal Navy commander.) Omer Azabagič, was a Partisan sympathiser and warned them of the date of the planned transfer. They passed this information on to British Royal Navy elements operating in the Adriatic.

In the evening of 24 June, T7 departed Šibenik with the German S-boats S 154 and S 157 of the 7th S-Boat Flotilla providing cover from a distance. T7 was intercepted by the Royal Navy Fairmile D motor torpedo boat MTB 670 and motor gunboats MGB 659 and MGB 662 near the island of Kukuljari, south of Murter Island. The British were accompanied by their Partisan liaison officer, retired KM Kontraadmiral (Note: Kontraadmiral in the KM was equivalent to a contemporary British Royal Navy rear admiral.) Ivan Preradović, now a Partisan colonel. Considering T7 was one of the few significant threats to British vessels in the region, the British commander ordered MTB 670 to launch a torpedo attack. The two torpedoes missed and exploded on the shore of Kukuljari, probably because their depth settings were too low, so the British boats pursued and approached the ship from abaft the beam. T7 opened fire at 150 yards (140 m). The British boats returned fire with their forward and port guns, and within 30 seconds they had disabled T7's weapons and set her ablaze. At a speed of about 12 knots (22 km/h; 14 mph), T7 suddenly veered to starboard, narrowly avoiding a collision with MGB 662 (it is not known whether her steering was damaged or if her crew was attempting to perform a ram) before running aground on Murter Island. The German S-boats were too far away to intervene. The British rescued and captured five crew members from T7 and learning that the S-boats were in the area, left the wreck to locate and attack them. The German S-boats withdrew, but returned later to rescue a few more crew. Of the crew of 35, 14 were killed or reported missing in action, including the boat's commander. The British later examined the wreck, capturing five more sailors and leaving her flooded and burning. A British Army demolition team destroyed the hulk to ensure it could not be salvaged. After the British intercepted T7, Azabagič defected to the Partisans. The boat was scrapped in situ in 1953.
