= Šepurine Military Barracks =

Base and airfield in Croatia until 2008

- Vojarna Šepurine i Aerodrom
- Zaton, Zadar County in Croatia

Site information
- Type: Military barracks and airfield
- Owner: Ministry of Defence (Croatia)
- Operator: Croatian Army (1991–2008)
- Controlled by: Yugoslav People's Army (until 1991); Croatian National Guard (1991); Croatian Army (1991–2008)
- Open to the public: No
- Condition: Abandoned

Location
- Location of Šepurine Military Barracks in Croatia
- Coordinates: 44.211°N 15.170°E
- Area: 1,000,000 square meters

Site history
- Built: 1995
- Built for: Yugoslav People's Army (JNA)
- In use: 1995–2008
- Materials: Concrete, steel
- Fate: Abandoned in 2008, proposed for redevelopment
- Battles/wars: Battle of the Barracks
- Events: Croatian War of Independence

Garrison information
- Past commanders: Milan Gligorič (JNA)
- Garrison: 550 soldiers (as of 1991)

Airfield information
- Identifiers: ICAO: LD57
Runways
Direction	Length and surface
02/20	1160 Asphalt

Šepurine Military Barracks (ICAO: LD57) is a former military base and airfield located in Zaton, Zadar County, Croatia. It was constructed by the Yugoslav National Army in 1995 and was the location of the Battle of the Barracks in 1991.

== History ==
Šepurine Military Barracks was initially constructed by the Yugoslav National Army in the mid-1960s as an anti-aircraft and rocket missile training base. The 271st Light Missile-Artillery Regiment and the 67th Self-Propelled Missile Regiment was stationed at the military base.

=== Battle of the Barracks ===
During the Croatian War of Independence in 1991, approximately 550 soldiers were stationed at the Šepurine barracks. The Croatian forces were interested to acquire control of the military base, but lacked sufficient strength for a direct takeover. Initial attempts to negotiate the barracks’ handover with its commander, Milan Gligorič, failed, leading to a blockade by the Croatian National Guard (ZNG) and police. Capturing the barracks was important, as its anti-aircraft weaponry would have hindered the Yugoslav People's Army's (JNA) ability to conduct air operations in the Dalmatia region. Many former soldiers from the Šepurine anti-aircraft missile regiment later joined the ZNG.

In early October 1991, two artillery regiments from the JNA stationed in Šepurine managed to pass through the blockade and later joined JNA's efforts to seize control of Zadar. After the acquisition, the military base became a center of education for special forces. In August 1995, the base was occupied by the United States Armed Forces during the planning of Operation Storm.

=== Closure and Redevelopment ===
In 2008, the Ministry of Defense abandoned the airfield and transferred ownership to the State Office for the Management of State Assets (DUUDI). Since its closure, the military base experienced heavy looting, destruction and vandalism. According to a county spatial plan, the former military airport was to be converted into a recreational sports airport, however it was not allowed. The agency in ownership (DUUDI) experienced criticism for the treatment of the military base. Today, the runway is used by Croat Bell OH-58D Kiowa helicopters for occasional training.
