= 250t-class torpedo boat =

Boat of the Austro-Hungarian Navy

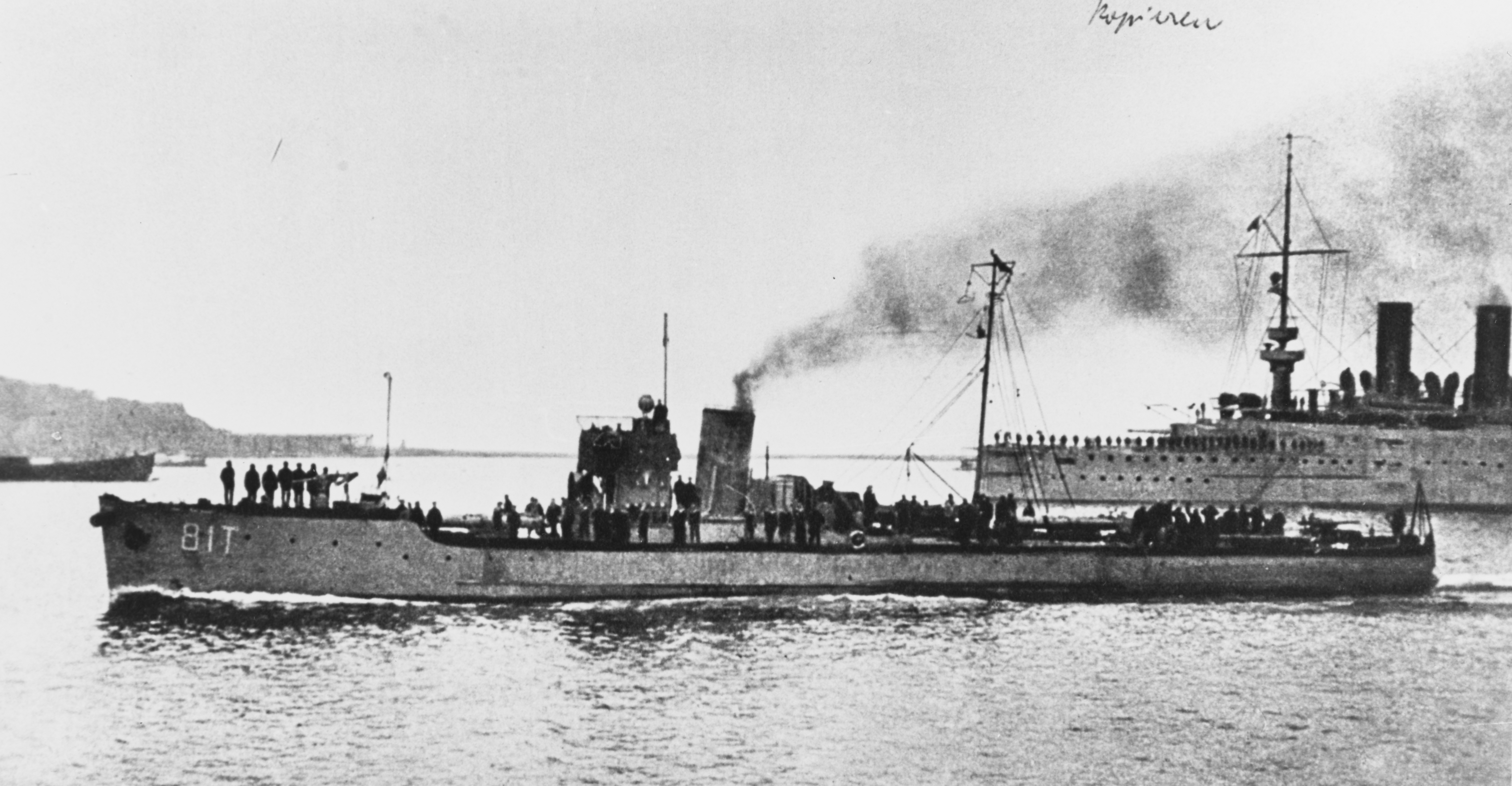
- One of the T-group boats of the 250t class, 81 T

Class overview
- Builders: T-group; Stabilimento Tecnico Triestino; F-group; Ganz & Danubius; M-group; Cantiere Navale Triestino
- Operators: Austro-Hungarian Navy; Navy of the Kingdom of Serbs, Croats and Slovenes; Romanian Naval Forces; Portuguese Navy; Hellenic Navy; Royal Yugoslav Navy; Regia Marina; Kriegsmarine; Navy of the Independent State of Croatia; Soviet Navy; Yugoslav Navy
- Preceded by: 110t-class torpedo boat
- Built: 1913–1916
- In commission: 1914–1963
- Completed: 27
- Lost: 15
- Scrapped: 12

General characteristics
- Type: Sea-going torpedo boat
- Displacement: 262–270 t (258–266 long tons); 320–330 t (315–325 long tons) (full load)
- Length: 58.2–60.5 m (190 ft 11 in – 198 ft 6 in)
- Beam: 5.6–5.8 m (18 ft 4 in – 19 ft 0 in)
- Draught: 1.5 m (4 ft 11 in) (all groups)
- Installed power: 2 × Yarrow boilers; 5,000–6,000 shp (3,700–4,500 kW)
- Propulsion: 2 × shafts; 2 × steam turbines
- Speed: 28–28.5 knots (51.9–52.8 km/h; 32.2–32.8 mph)
- Endurance: T-group; 980 nmi (1,810 km; 1,130 mi) at 16 knots (30 km/h; 18 mph); F-group and M-group; 1,200 nmi (2,200 km; 1,400 mi) at 16 knots (30 km/h; 18 mph)
- Complement: 38–39
- Armament: 2 × Škoda 66 mm (2.6 in) L/30 guns; 4 × 450 mm (17.7 in) torpedo tubes; 10–12 naval mines

The 250t class were high-seas torpedo boats built for the Austro-Hungarian Navy between 1913 and 1916. A total of 27 boats were built by three shipbuilding companies, with the letter after the boat number indicating the manufacturer. There were small variations between manufacturers, mainly in the steam turbines used, and whether they had one or two funnels. The eight boats of the T-group, designated 74 T – 81 T, were built by Stabilimento Tecnico Triestino, located at Triest. The sixteen boats of the F-group, 82 F – 97 F, were built by Ganz-Danubius at their shipyards at Fiume and Porto Re. The three M-group boats, 98 M – 100 M, were manufactured by Cantiere Navale Triestino at Monfalcone.

All 27 boats saw service in World War I, undertaking anti-submarine operations in the Adriatic Sea, shore bombardment missions along its Italian coastline, and convoy, escort and minesweeping tasks. Although widely used during the war, the class suffered no losses, despite taking hits during surface engagements and damage from accidents. In 1917, some of the 66 mm (2.6 in) guns on the boats were placed on anti-aircraft mounts. Under the terms of the post-war Treaty of Saint-Germain-en-Laye, the boats were transferred to various countries, including seven to Romania, six to Portugal, six to Greece, and eight to the newly created Kingdom of Serbs, Croats and Slovenes (later Yugoslavia). By 1940, thirteen boats of the class had been lost or scrapped, including all six Portuguese boats.

During World War II, the five remaining Greek boats were sunk by Axis aircraft during the German-led invasion of Greece in April 1941. One Romanian boat was lost during the war, while the two remaining Romanian boats performed escort tasks in the Black Sea before being taken over by the Soviet Navy, and serving in the Black Sea Fleet until the end of the war; they were finally stricken in late 1945.

The six surviving Yugoslav boats were captured by the Italians during the Axis invasion of Yugoslavia in April 1941, and were operated by the Regia Marina in a coastal and second-line escort role. Immediately following the Italian capitulation in September 1943, one ex-Yugoslav boat was sunk by German aircraft while attempting to escape to Allied-held southern Italy, another was scuttled by its Italian crew when it had insufficient fuel to escape, and two more escaped and were transferred back into Yugoslav hands a few months later. The remaining two were seized by the Germans. Of these, both were operated by Croatian crews or by the Navy of the Independent State of Croatia for some time before being recovered by the Germans. One was destroyed by Royal Navy Motor Torpedo Boats in June 1944, and the other was sunk by Royal Air Force aircraft in 1945. The two surviving boats were commissioned by the Yugoslav Navy after the war, one continuing in service until the early 1960s.

== Background ==
In 1910, the Austria-Hungary Naval Technical Committee initiated the design and development of a 275-tonne (271-long-ton) coastal torpedo boat, specifying that it should be capable of sustaining 30 knots (56 km/h; 35 mph) for 10 hours. At the same time, the committee issued design parameters for a high seas or fleet torpedo boat of 500–550 t (490–540 long tons), top speed of 30 kn and endurance of 480 nautical miles (890 km; 550 mi). This design would have been a larger and better-armed vessel than the existing Austro-Hungarian 400-tonne (390-long-ton) Huszár-class destroyers. The specification for the high seas torpedo boat was based on an expectation that the Strait of Otranto, where the Adriatic Sea meets the Ionian Sea, would be blockaded by hostile forces during a future conflict. In such circumstances, there would be a need for a torpedo boat that could sail from the Austro-Hungarian Navy (German: kaiserliche und königliche Kriegsmarine, Hungarian: Császári és Királyi Haditengerészet) base at the Bocche di Cattaro (the Bocche or Bay of Kotor) to the strait during the night, locate and attack blockading ships and return to port before morning. Steam turbine power was selected for propulsion, as diesels with the necessary power were not available, and the Austro-Hungarian Navy did not have the practical experience to run turbo-electric boats. Despite having developed these ideas, the Austro-Hungarian Navy then asked shipyards to submit proposals for a 250 t (250-long-ton) boat with a maximum speed of 28 kn (52 km/h; 32 mph).

== Description and construction ==
Stabilimento Tecnico Triestino (STT) of Triest was selected for the contract to build eight vessels, ahead of one other tenderer. The 250t class were classified as high seas torpedo boats by the Austro-Hungarian Navy, despite being smaller than the original concept for a coastal torpedo boat. The naval historian Zvonimir Freivogel states that this type of situation was common due to the parsimony of the Austro-Hungarian Navy. The STT boats used Parsons turbines driving two propeller shafts. Another tender was requested for four more boats, but when Ganz-Danubius reduced their price by ten percent, a total of sixteen boats were ordered from them. These boats were powered by AEG-Curtiss turbines, and had two funnels rather than the single funnel of the STT boats. The third contract went to Cantiere Navale Triestino (CNT), who used Melms-Pfenniger turbines, and their boats also had two funnels. The boats of all three groups used steam generated by two Yarrow water-tube boilers, one of which burned fuel oil and the other coal.

The boats of the class were fast and agile, well designed for service in the Adriatic. The M-group boats were longer overall and had a longer forecastle than the T- and F- group boats. All boats of the class had a slight flare at the bow, a straight stem and keel, and a rounded stern. Until October 1915, the boats were painted black, but from that point they were painted a light blue-grey. The hulls were built with a series of 13 transverse bulkheads dividing them into 14 watertight compartments. The forward collision compartment and anchor chain locker were in the fore, abaft of which were two larger accommodation compartments for the enlisted crew, then the forward and aft boiler rooms, the forward and aft turbine rooms, accommodation for officers and non-commissioned officers, and the equipment room was located in the stern. The first two groups had a semi-balanced rudder, whereas the M-group boats had a fully balanced rudder.

The T-group boats were originally to be armed with three 66 mm (2.6 in) guns, and three 450 mm (17.7 in) torpedo tubes – one twin and one single – but this was changed to two guns and four torpedo tubes – consisting of two twin mountings – before the first boat was completed, to standardise the armament with the F group to follow. When completed, all 27 boats were armed with two Škoda 66 mm (2.6 in) L/30 (Note: L/30 denotes the length of the gun. In this case, the L/30 gun is 30 calibre, meaning that the gun was 30 times as long as the diameter of its bore.) guns. They were installed on anti-torpedo boat (Torpedobootabwehrgeschütze or TAG) mounts – fore and aft – without gun shields, and fired a 5.78 kg (12.7 lb) shell at a muzzle velocity of 550 m/s (1,800 ft/s) to a maximum range of 7,000 m (4.3 mi) at an elevation of 25 degrees. A total of 216 shells were carried for each gun. On the T- and F- group boats, the forward torpedo tubes were mounted between the forecastle and bridge, and on the M-group boats, they were mounted on the aft section of the extended forecastle. On the T-group boats the aft torpedo tubes were located directly abaft the mainmast, and on the F-group boats they were mounted on the quarterdeck, abaft the ship's boat. On the M group boats, the aft torpedo tubes were mounted immediately forward of the aft mast. The torpedo tubes were manufactured by the Whitehead Torpedo Factory in Fiume, and fired the Whitehead 450 mm L/5 torpedo, which was 5.5 m (18 ft 1 in) long and weighed 772 kg (1,702 lb) with a 110 kg (240 lb) warhead. At a range of 1,000 m (3,300 ft) the torpedo could reach a maximum speed of 42 kn (78 km/h; 48 mph), and at a range of 6,000 m (20,000 ft) they could travel at 27 kn (50 km/h; 31 mph). A 40 cm (16 in) searchlight was mounted above the bridge. In July 1914, one 8 mm (0.31 in) Schwarzlose M.7/12 machine gun was included in the armament of all boats of the class for anti-aircraft work. Four mounting points were installed so that the machine gun could be mounted in the most effective position depending on the expected direction of attack. Each vessel could carry 10–12 naval mines.

=== T-group ===
The T-group were built by STT at the Port of Triest between April 1913 and December 1914. They had a waterline length of 57.84 m (189 ft 9 in), a beam of 5.75 m (18 ft 10 in), and a normal draught of 1.54 m (5 ft 1 in). While their designed displacement was 262 tonnes (258 long tons), they displaced about 267.3 tonnes (263.1 long tons) fully loaded. Their Parsons turbines were rated at 5,000–5,700 shp (3,700–4,300 kW) and designed to propel the boats to a top speed of 28 knots (52 km/h; 32 mph). They carried 18.2 tonnes (17.9 long tons) of coal and 24.3 tonnes (23.9 long tons) of fuel oil, which gave them a range of 1,000 nmi (1,900 km; 1,200 mi) at 16 knots (30 km/h; 18 mph).

The boats were originally to be armed with three 66 mm (2.6 in) guns, and three 450 mm (17.7 in) torpedo tubes – one twin and one single – but this was changed to two guns and four torpedo tubes – consisting of two twin mountings – before the first boat was completed, to standardise the armament with the F group to follow. The torpedo tubes were mounted in pairs, with one pair mounted between the forecastle and bridge, and the other on a section of raised superstructure above the aft machinery room.

Construction of T-group torpedo boats
Name	Laid down	Launched	Commissioned
74 T	16 April 1913	28 August 1913	17 June 1914
75 T	28 May 1913	20 November 1913	11 July 1914
76 T	24 August 1913	15 December 1913	20 July 1914
77 T	24 August 1913	30 January 1914	11 August 1914
78 T	22 October 1913	4 March 1914	23 August 1914
79 T	1 December 1913	30 April 1914	1 October 1914
80 T	19 December 1913	3 August 1914	8 November 1914
81 T	6 February 1914	6 August 1914	2 December 1914

When 74 T's turbines were initially installed, they suffered a major problem with heat expansion of the turbine blades, causing friction between the rotor and stator blades. The issue was so significant that her turbines had to be rebuilt, with additional space between the blades and improved fixing of the rotor blades. Having been first commissioned on 1 February 1914, 74 T was commissioned for a second time on 17 June. Likewise, the next two boats of the T-group had to have their turbines removed, modified and reinstalled due to these issues.

=== F-group ===
The F-group were built by Ganz & Danubius at Fiume and nearby Porto Re between October 1913 and December 1916. They had a waterline length of 58.5 m (191 ft 11 in), a beam of 5.8 m (19 ft 0 in), and a normal draught of 1.5 m (4 ft 11 in). While their designed displacement was 266 tonnes (262 long tons), they displaced about 330 tonnes (320 long tons) fully loaded. The crew consisted of 38 officers and enlisted men. Their AEG-Curtiss turbines were rated at 5,000 shp (3,700 kW) with a maximum output of 6,000 shp (4,500 kW), and the boats were designed to reach a top speed of 28 knots (52 km/h; 32 mph). During trials, 93 F produced 6,450 shp (4,810 kW), and reached a top speed of 29.7 knots (55.0 km/h; 34.2 mph). They carried 20 long tons (20.3 t) of coal and 34 long tons (34.5 t) of fuel oil, which gave them a range of 1,200 nmi (2,200 km; 1,400 mi) at 16 knots (30 km/h; 18 mph).

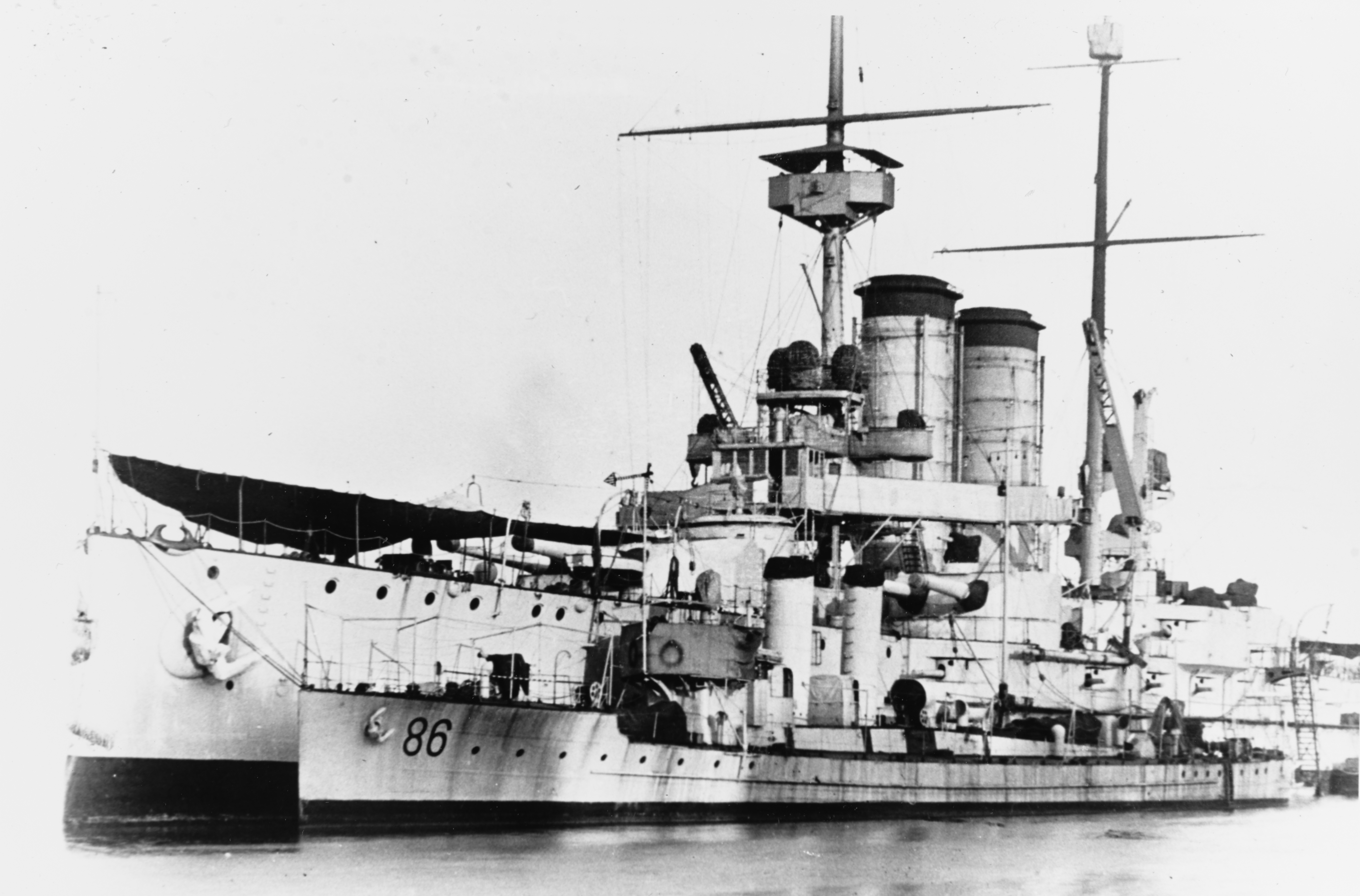
The F-group boat 86 F alongside the battleship SMS Erzherzog Franz Ferdinand

Construction of F-group torpedo boats
Name	Laid down	Launched	Completed
82 F	30 October 1913	11 August 1914	16 August 1916
83 F	17 November 1913	7 November 1914	7 August 1915
84 F	27 November 1913	21 November 1914	2 November 1916
85 F	7 January 1914	5 December 1914	19 December 1915
86 F	26 January 1914	19 December 1914	23 May 1916
87 F	5 March 1914	20 March 1915	25 October 1915
88 F	7 March 1914	24 April 1915	30 November 1915
89 F	13 May 1914	12 May 1915	1 March 1916
90 F	9 September 1914	28 May 1915	8 August 1916
91 F	24 November 1914	21 June 1916	11 July 1916
92 F	30 November 1914	29 September 1916	23 March 1916
93 F	9 January 1915	25 November 1915	16 April 1916
94 F	19 January 1915	8 March 1916	17 June 1916
95 F	9 February 1915	24 June 1916	27 September 1916
96 F	24 February 1915	7 July 1916	23 November 1916
97 F	5 March 1915	20 August 1916	22 December 1916

When Italy declared war on Austria-Hungary in May 1915, five incomplete F-group boats were towed to be completed in safety. 82 F, 83 F and 84 F were taken from Porto Re to Pola, and 90 F and 91 F were taken to Novigrad. This resulted in delays to the completion of these boats.

=== M-group ===
The M-group were built by CNT at Monfalcone between March 1914 and March 1916. They had a waterline length of 60.5 m (198 ft 6 in), a beam of 5.6 m (18 ft 4 in), and a normal draught of 1.5 m (4 ft 11 in). Their designed displacement was 270 tonnes (266 long tons), and they displaced about 330 tonnes (320 long tons) fully loaded. The crew consisted of 38 officers and enlisted men. Their Melms-Pfenniger turbines were rated at 5,000 shp (3,700 kW) with a maximum output of 6,000 shp (4,500 kW), and the boats were designed to reach a top speed of 28.5 knots (52.8 km/h; 32.8 mph). They carried enough coal and fuel oil to give them a range of 1,200 nmi (2,200 km; 1,400 mi) at 16 knots (30 km/h; 18 mph).

Construction of M-group torpedo boats
Name	Laid down	Launched	Completed
98 M	19 March 1914	18 November 1914	19 August 1915
99 M	22 March 1914	17 December 1914	29 October 1915
100 M	28 March 1914	15 January 1915	13 March 1916

== Service history ==
=== World War I ===
All 27 boats saw service, performing convoy, escort and minesweeping tasks, anti-submarine operations, and shore bombardment missions. They also conducted patrols and supported seaplane raids against the Italian coast. Due to inadequate funding, the 250t class were essentially coastal vessels, despite the original intention that they would be used for "high seas" operations.

==== 1914 ====
At the outbreak of World War I, 74 T – 77 T comprised the 1st Torpedo Group of the 3rd Torpedo Division of the Austro-Hungarian 1st Torpedo Flotilla, which was led by the scout cruiser Saida commanded by Linienschiffskapitän (Captain) Heinrich Seitz, and supported by the mother ship Gäa. The concept of operation for the 250t-class boats was that they would sail in a flotilla at the rear of a cruising battle formation, and were to intervene in fighting only if the battleships around which the formation was established were disabled, or in order to attack damaged enemy battleships. When a torpedo attack was ordered, it was to be led by a scout cruiser, supported by two destroyers to repel any enemy torpedo boats. A group of four to six torpedo boats would deliver the attack under the direction of the flotilla commander.

In early September 1914, intelligence was received by the Austro-Hungarian command that an Italian volunteer corps were planning to land on the Dalmatian or Istrian coast, and the 1st and 2nd Torpedo Flotillas were involved fruitless patrolling off Sebenico and Zara, and Istria, respectively, between 19 and 24 September. It appears that this was French disinformation intended to keep the Austro-Hungarian fleet engaged while they conducted operations in the southern Adriatic. On the evening of 3 November, the 1st Torpedo Flotilla left Sebenico to make a night torpedo attack on the French fleet, which had begun its seventh raid on the Adriatic on 31 October, but by the time they reached the threatened areas, the French had withdrawn as they were running low on coal.

==== 1915 ====
Italy declared war on Austria-Hungary on the afternoon of 23 May 1915, and almost the entire Austro-Hungarian fleet left Pola soon after to deliver an immediate response against Italian cities and towns along the Adriatic coast, aiming to interdict land and sea transport between southern Italy and the northern regions of that country which were expected to be a theatre of land operations. The fleet split into six groups with a range of targets up and down the coast. Group A included three dreadnought battleships, six pre-dreadnought battleships, and four destroyers, accompanied by 74 T – 77 T and 83 F, fourteen Kaiman-class torpedo boats and six seaplanes, and participated in the Bombardment of Ancona, a shore bombardment operation against the northern Adriatic coast of Italy. The bombardment began at 04:04 on 24 May, and caused significant damage in the shipyard, killing 68, 30 of them military personnel, and wounding 150. The destroyers entered the harbour and launched several torpedoes, sinking one steam ship and damaging two others. Group A withdrew after 05:00 when news was received of Italian submarines leaving Venice en route to Pola. Group E, formed by the light cruiser Novara, a destroyer and 78 T – 81 T, was involved in the shelling of Porto Corsini near Ravenna. In the latter action, an Italian 120 mm (4.7 in) shore battery returned fire, hitting Novara, killing six and wounding ten, and also damaging 80 T, which had not entered the harbour. 81 T joined Novara in shelling the semaphore station and a lighthouse, and then engaged in the duel with the coastal artillery.

The 250t-class torpedo boats continued to be involved in shore bombardment operations. On 23 July, 77 T and 78 T participated in such a mission led by the scout cruiser Helgoland against Ortona on the central Adriatic coast of Italy. (Note: According to Cernuschi and O'Hara, the 23 July operation involved 74 T and 78 T in a shore bombardment and landing operation led by Saida against San Benedetto del Tronto, Ortona and Termoli. Freivogel states that a separate group of destroyers attacked Termoli and Campomarino, and a landing party from two more destroyers cut the telegraph cable on the Tremiti Islands, and does not mention the involvement of Saida.) Four days later, the scout cruiser Admiral Spaun, Novara, two destroyers and 75 T, 76 T and 79 T shelled the railway line between Ancona and Pesaro while seaplanes bombed Ancona.

On 28 July, 80 T and 81 T were part of the first major attempt to land on the Italian-occupied island of Pelagosa in the mid-Adriatic. Led by Saida and Helgoland, the six Tatra-class destroyers and two torpedo boats bombarded the island, then landed 108 officers and sailors. The 90-man Italian naval garrison – the size and strength of which had been underestimated by the attacking force – defended bravely, and after two hours the Austro-Hungarian force withdrew, having suffered two killed and ten wounded. Only two Italians were wounded. The 1st Torpedo Flotilla, comprising Saida and Helgoland, five destroyers and five torpedo boats, again attacked Pelagosa on 17 August. 74 T, 77 T and 78 T conducted anti-submarine patrols south of the island along with two destroyers. The bombardment was successful, and managed to destroy defences, a large quantity of supplies, and crucially, the water cistern. This was the final straw for the Italians, who abandoned the island the following day.

In late November 1915, the Austro-Hungarian fleet deployed a force from its main fleet base at Pola to the Bocche; this force included six of the T-group torpedo boats. This force was tasked to maintain a permanent patrol of the Albanian coastline and interdict any troop transports crossing from Italy. A seaplane attack on Ancona on 9 December was supported by 79 T, 85 F and 87 F, accompanying the protected cruiser Szigetvár, two destroyers and two Kaiman-class torpedo boats. Another seaplane attack, this time on Rimini on 14 December, was supported by 83 F, 87 F and 89 F, along with Szigetvár, two destroyers and two Kaiman-class torpedo boats. After an attack on Durazzo in Albania on 30 December in which two Austro-Hungarian destroyers were sunk after straying out of a cleared lane through a minefield, 74 T, 77 T, 78 T, 80 T and 81 T were sent south with Novara, in order to strengthen morale and try to prevent the transfer of the captured crew of one of the destroyers to Italy. No Italian ships were encountered, and the group returned to the Bocche the following day.

==== 1916 ====
On 3 February 1916, 83 F, 87 F and 88 F were involved in another shore bombardment operation against targets near San Vito Chietino and the railway line between Ortona and Tollo, this time led by the armoured cruiser Sankt Georg accompanied by Helgoland and the Huszár-class destroyer Wildfang. This bombardment was conducted as part of the transfer of these ships between Pola and the Bocche, and included an artillery duel between Sankt Georg and an Italian armed train equipped with 4.7 in guns manned by naval personnel. Three days later, Wildfang was south of the Bocche awaiting the return of seaplanes from a mission when the British light cruiser HMS Liverpool and the Italian Rosolino Pilo-class destroyer Pilade Bronzetti appeared. Wildfang engaged in a short exchange of fire under the protection of coastal guns and withdrew. In response to the arrival of Liverpool and Pilade Bronzetti, Helgoland, 74 T, 78 T, 80 T, 83 F, 87 F and 88 F sailed, but they were met by another British light cruiser, HMS Weymouth, and the French destroyer Bouclier, that had relieved Liverpool and Pilade Bronzetti in the intervening period. The Austro-Hungarian torpedo boats, split into two groups, launched torpedo attacks on the new Allied formation, but the only damage was caused by a collision between 74 T and 83 F. The group led by 74 T withdrew to Budua after the collision, but the other group attacked, scoring no hits. Finally, the Austro-Hungarian ships withdrew to the Bocche, having achieved little, and missed opportunities to attack enemy vessels operating further south.

On 22 February, 76 T, 77 T and 83 F, accompanied by a Kaiman-class torpedo boat, laid a minefield outside Antivari harbour. With Austro-Hungarian forces closing on Durazzo from the land, the Allies began to evacuate by sea, and Austro-Hungarian naval forces were sent to attempt to interdict. On 24 February, Helgoland, four destroyers, 77 T, 78 T, 80 T, 83 T, 83 F and 88 F were sent to intercept four Italian destroyers covering the evacuation, but were unable to locate them.

On 3 May, 76 T, 92 F, 93 F and 98 M – 100 M were accompanying four destroyers supporting the return of seaplanes that had attacked Ravenna and Porto Corsini when they were involved in a surface action off Porto Corsini against an Italian force consisting of the flotilla leaders Cesare Rossarol and Guglielmo Pepe, and the destroyers Francesco Nullo and Giuseppe Missori. According to the naval historians Enrico Cernuschi and Vincent P. O'Hara, the Austro-Hungarian force retreated behind a minefield with no damage to the torpedo boats, and only splinter damage to the Huszár-class destroyer Csikós. However, a more recent work by the naval historian Zvonimir Freivogel disputes the latter assertion, saying that none of the vessels on either side were damaged.

On 24 May, the Allies were anticipating a significant Austro-Hungarian attack from the sea to mark the first anniversary of the Italians entering the war, and a two Allied cruisers and six destroyers were despatched to patrol the area between the Bocche and Brindisi. An Austro-Hungarian force consisting of four destroyers, 75 T, 89 F, 92 F, and 98 M – 100 M was at sea supporting the return of eleven seaplanes that had been sent to attack Padua. Due to fog, only one of the aircraft had been able to identify and drop bombs on a target there, but on the return trip, one of the aircraft mistakenly dropped three bombs on 92 F, luckily missing the target. The same aircraft strafed 100 M with its machine gun. Two torpedo boats from the Italian force, 21 OS and 22 OS engaged in a brief exchange of fire with 75 T. During the action, 75 T was hit. On the night of 31 May – 1 June 1916, the Tátra-class destroyers Orjen and Balaton, accompanied by 77 T, 79 T and 81 T were sent to engage sea traffic across the Strait of Otranto in the area of the Allied naval blockade. Near Fasano, they raided the Otranto Barrage, and Orjen engaged in a gunnery duel with the British drifter Beneficent then sank her with a torpedo, but once the alarm had been raised, the Austro-Hungarian force withdrew. Only one sailor from Beneficent survived.

The Italian destroyer Zeffiro, accompanied by two torpedo boats, entered Parenzo in Istria on 12 June, covered by two groups of destroyers, with the aim of destroying the seaplane base within the harbour. Coastal batteries and guns at the seaplane station opened fire almost immediately, and three seaplanes took off and began attacking the invaders. In the exchange of fire, Zeffiro was damaged and the Italians had to retire, pursued by 93 F, 98 M and 99 M. On 3 July, 83 F, 85 F, 87 F accompanied Helgoland and three destroyers in a fruitless raid on the Otranto Barrage.

On 9 July, Novara led a force which included 87 F and two Kaiman-class torpedo boats in another night raid on the Otranto Barrage which resulted in the sinking of two drifters. The following day, 75 T exchanged fire with four enemy warships. On 31 July, the Italian submarine Giacinto Pullino stranded on rocks in the Bay of Fiume. The Austro-Hungarians attempted to salvage her, but she sank while under tow. One of the ships involved in her attempted salvage was 50 E, which was unsuccessfully attacked by the Italian submarine Argo during the operation. On the night of 1/2 August, the Huszár-class destroyers Warasdiner and Wildfang conducted a shore bombardment of Molfetta on the southern Adriatic coast of Italy, covered by the cruiser Aspern, 80 T and 85 F. On the return trip they exchanged fire at extreme range with four Italian destroyers that were trying to intercept them. A further group of Allied vessels led by the Italian protected cruiser Nino Bixio and HMS Liverpool, accompanied by four destroyers and six torpedo boats. The Austro-Hungarian submarine SM U-4 unsuccessfully engaged Nino Bixio, and the Austro-Hungarian force withdrew before the cruisers closed to gun range.

91 F, 94 F and 98 M were chased and engaged by Italian torpedo boats off Pola on 11 August, resulting in splinter damage to one of the Italian boats. The Austro-Hungarians sent a large force of four cruisers and five destroyers, accompanied by 83 F, 85 F, 87 F and 88 F, to sail off the Italian coast on 28 August, hoping to draw the Allied fleet into a trap formed by four submarines, but fog meant they were not seen, and no engagements resulted. On 15 September, in a first in naval warfare, the submerged French submarine Foucault was sunk by Austro-Hungarian aircraft near the Bocche. The seaplanes landed and captured the entire crew of 27, holding them until 100 M arrived and took them on board. 87 F, 99 M and 100 M conducted a fruitless raid on the Otranto Barrage on the night of 4/5 October. On 4 November, three Italian destroyers and three torpedo boats were involved in a brief encounter in the northern Adriatic with two Austro-Hungarian destroyers accompanied by 83 F, 87 F and 88 F. On the following day, 83 F, 87 F and 88 F conducted a shore bombardment of Sant'Elpidio a Mare.

==== 1917 ====
Map of the Adriatic Sea showing the location of major ports and actions

At the beginning of 1917, the 1st Torpedo Flotilla, consisting of Helgoland, four Tatra-class destroyers and the 250t-class torpedo boats, was based out of the Bocche. During 1917, one of the 66 mm (2.6 in) guns on each boat was placed on an anti-aircraft mount. On the night of 21/22 April, 84 F, 92 F, 94 F and 100 M conducted a night raid on the Otranto Barrage, sinking the freighter Japigia. (Note: According to Cernuschi and O'Hara, the 21/22 April operation also involved four destroyers and sank a drifter.) On 11 May, the British submarine H1 stalked 78 T off Pola, firing two torpedoes at her. The British captain had kept his submarine's periscope extended too far and for too long, and the tell-tale "feather" alerted the crew of 78 T, allowing her to avoid the incoming torpedoes. That night, the destroyer Csikós, accompanied by 78 T, 93 F and 96 F, were pursued in the northern Adriatic by an Italian force of five destroyers, but were able to retire to safety behind a minefield.

On 14–15 May 1917, several 250t-class boats were part of the support forces for a major raid on the Otranto Barrage. When the raiding force departed, torpedo boats and aircraft secured the approaches to the Austro-Hungarian naval base at the Bocche. Once the raiding force had departed for the barrage, Sankt Georg, a destroyer, and 84 F, 88 F, 99 M and 100 M were to be prepared to sortie out to support the raiders on their return voyage. The old coastal defence ship Budapest and 86 F, 91 F and 95 F were also available at the Bocche if needed. Although the raid was a relative success, sinking 14 drifters, the raiding force was then engaged by Allied ships in the Battle of the Otranto Straits. Both support groups sailed to meet the returning Austro-Hungarian force, which included the heavily damaged Novara under tow. On marrying-up with the raiding force, the torpedo boats fanned out to screen the larger warships, protecting them as they returned to port. On 21 May 1917, the suffix of all Austro-Hungarian torpedo boats was removed, and thereafter they were referred to only by the numeral. On 24 May, 89 and the Cobra-class torpedo boat 16 were escorting the German minelaying submarines UC-24 and UC-74 into the Adriatic from the Bocche when UC-24 was torpedoed and sunk by the Circé. Only two crew members were rescued.

On 3 June, the destroyers Wildfang and Csikós, along with 93 and 96, briefly encountered three Italian MAS boats off the mouth of the Tagliamento river in the far north of the Adriatic. This group, with the addition of the destroyer Velebit, was supporting an attack by six seaplanes on the Italian coast that night when Wildfang struck a mine about 30 nmi (56 km; 35 mi) southwest of Cape Penada on the island of Veli Brijun off Istria. She sank in ten minutes, and 25 of the crew drowned, with 74 rescued. During the July build-up to the Eleventh Battle of the Isonzo, there were several seaplane attacks on the coastal areas of the Italian front in the northern Adriatic which were supported by the Austro-Hungarian fleet. During one of these, an attack on Grado and Cervignano del Friuli by 21 aircraft, cover was provided by 76, 80, 92 and 96 along with three destroyers.

On 23 September, 77 and 78 were laying a minefield off Grado in the northern Adriatic when they had a brief encounter with an Italian MAS boat. The following night, 94, 95 and two other torpedo boats again had a short and inconclusive engagement with Italian torpedo boats in the northern Adriatic. On 29 September, 90, 94, 98 and 99 were accompanying a squadron of four destroyers supporting an air attack on the Italian airfield at Ferrara by flying boats. After destroying an Italian airship, the squadron withdrew at high speed in the darkness, but was intercepted by an Italian squadron of eight destroyers that had been sent from Venice to support an Italian air raid on Pola. In the resultant 45 minute chase towards Parenzo, two Italian destroyers and three Austro-Hungarian destroyers were damaged, and 94 was hit by splinters. As the squadron retreated through the minefields off Parenzo, 98 was also hit by Italian fire, resulting in one casualty.

Two sorties involving boats of the class were conducted on 18 October. In the south, 82, 91, 92 and 94 and five seaplanes acted as scouts for a raid led by Helgoland accompanied by six destroyers, and further north and later in the day, 82, 87, 91, 92, 94 and 95 were part of an escort for a convoy running supplies to Pirano destined for the troops on the Italian Front.

On 14 November, 84, 92, 94, 99 and 100 encountered four Italian destroyers off the mouth of the Piave, but the torpedo boats were again able to elude their pursuers by sailing behind a minefield. Two days later, the coastal defence ships Wien and Budapest sailed to engage a 152 mm (6.0 in) Italian shore battery at Cortellazzo near the mouth of the Piave, with an escort that included 84, 92, 94, 98 – 100 and some minesweepers. Both Wien and Budapest were hit, but none of the torpedo boats suffered any damage. After an Italian force of seven destroyers and three MAS boats appeared, the bombarding force withdrew. On 28 November, 250t-class boats were involved in two shore bombardment missions. In the first mission, 79, 86 and 90 supported the bombardment of Senigallia by three destroyers, before they were joined by 78, 82, 87, 89 and 95 and another three destroyers for the bombardment of Porto Corsini, Marotta and Cesenatico. On 19 December, a large Austro-Hungarian force engaged the Italian shore battery at Cortellazzo. The force consisted of the pre-dreadnought Árpád, Admiral Spaun, Budapest, six destroyers, ten torpedo boats including 84, 92, 94 and 98 – 100, and ten minesweepers. None of the ships of the bombarding force suffered damage during the mission.

==== 1918 ====
Elements of the Austro-Hungarian fleet mutinied in the Bocche di Cattaro in February 1918, and in May, a plot was discovered to take over 80 at Pola. The motive appeared to be nationalism. Two of the ringleaders, a Czech and a Dalmatian Croat, were tried, convicted and executed by firing squad. On 13 May, the destroyer Dukla, 84 and 98 were at Durazzo when two Italian MAS boats forced the harbour, sinking one Austro-Hungarian freighter. On 10 June, 76 – 79, 81 and 87 were part of the escort force that failed to protect the Austro-Hungarian dreadnought Szent István from the Italian MAS boats that sank her. During that action, 76 fired at the Italian boats, but did not score a hit. On 1 July, the destroyers Balaton and Csikós, along with 83 and 88, were chased offshore from Caorle by seven Italian destroyers. All four Austro-Hungarian ships were hit, with 83 hit three times, and 88 struck once. One of the Italian destroyers was hit three times, and another was slightly damaged by splinters. On 6 September, 86 and two other torpedo boats were engaged by three Italian destroyers in the Gulf of Drin. 86 was hit, and the Austro-Hungarian force withdrew. On 2 October, 87 was at Durazzo when the port was bombarded by a multinational Allied naval force. She escaped with minor damage, in what was the last major action involving the Austro-Hungarian Navy.

=== Post-World War I transfers ===
Under the provisions of the Treaty of Saint-Germain-en-Laye, all Austro-Hungarian warships were surrendered to the Allies. The 250t-class torpedo boats were distributed among Romania, Portugal, Greece, and the newly created Kingdom of Serbs, Croats and Slovenes (later Yugoslavia), as follows:

Transfer of T-group torpedo boats
Austro-Hungarian name	Transferred to	New name	Inter-war fate
74	Romanian Navy	Viforul	scrapped in 1932
75	(Kingdom of Romania)	Vartejul	scrapped in 1932
76	Navy of the Kingdom of Serbs, Croats and Slovenes	T1	
77	Navy of the Kingdom of Serbs, Croats and Slovenes	T2	scrapped in 1939
78	Navy of the Kingdom of Serbs, Croats and Slovenes	T3	
79	Navy of the Kingdom of Serbs, Croats and Slovenes	T4	lost 1932 (Note: T4 ran aground on the Dalmatian coast and became a total loss.)
80	(Kingdom of Romania)	Vijelia	scrapped in 1932
81	(Kingdom of Romania)	Sborul	

Transfer of F-group torpedo boats
Austro-Hungarian name	Transferred to	New name	Inter-war fate
82	(Kingdom of Romania) Romanian Navy	Năluca	
83	(Kingdom of Romania) Romanian Navy	Smeul	
84	(Kingdom of Romania) Romanian Navy	Fulgerul	lost in the Bosphorus (Note: En route to the Black Sea after handover.)
85	Portuguese Navy	Zezere	lost 1921 (Note: Wrecked near Bône, Algeria, while en route from the Adriatic to Portugal after handover.)
86	Portuguese Navy	Ave	scrapped 1940
87	Navy of the Kingdom of Serbs, Croats and Slovenes	T5	
88	Portuguese Navy	Cavado	lost 1921 (Note: Wrecked near Bône, Algeria, while en route from the Adriatic to Portugal after handover.)
89	Portuguese Navy	Sado	scrapped 1940
90	Portuguese Navy	Liz	scrapped 1934
91	Portuguese Navy	Mondego	scrapped 1938
92	Hellenic Navy	Proussa	
93	Navy of the Kingdom of Serbs, Croats and Slovenes	T6	
94	Hellenic Navy	Panormos	lost 1938 (Note: Struck a reef and sank off the island of Aegina.)
95	Hellenic Navy	Pergamos	
96	Navy of the Kingdom of Serbs, Croats and Slovenes	T7	
97	Navy of the Kingdom of Serbs, Croats and Slovenes	T8	

Transfer of M-group torpedo boats
Austro-Hungarian name	Transferred to	New name	Inter-war fate
98	Hellenic Navy	Kyzikos	
99	Hellenic Navy	Kios	
100	Hellenic Navy	Kydoniai	

=== World War II ===
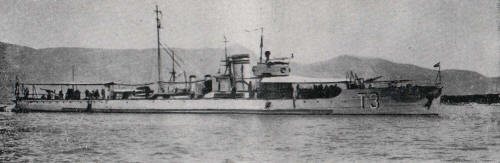
The Yugoslav torpedo boat T3 photographed in 1931

By 1940, thirteen boats of the class had been lost or scrapped, including all six Portuguese boats. At the time of the Axis invasion of Yugoslavia in April 1941, the Yugoslav boats T1 and T3 were assigned to the Southern Sector of Coastal Defence Command based at the Bay of Kotor, along with several minesweepers and other craft. T5–T8 comprised the 3rd Torpedo Division located at Šibenik. On 8 April, the four boats of the 3rd Torpedo Division, along with other vessels, were tasked to support an attack on the Italian enclave of Zara on the Dalmatian coast. They were subjected to three Italian air attacks and, after the last one, sailed from the area of Zaton into Lake Prokljan, where they remained until 11 April. On 12 April, the 3rd Torpedo Division arrived at Milna on the island of Brač, and refused to follow orders to sail to the Bay of Kotor. All six Yugoslav boats were then captured by the Italians.

The five surviving Greek boats were all sunk by aircraft during the German invasion of Greece, also in April 1941. The first was Proussa, which was sunk off Corfu on 4 April by Italian Junkers Ju 87 "Picchiatellos" of the 239th Squadron, 97th Dive Bomber Group. (Note: According to Greger, Proussa was sunk by German bombers on the same day and at the same location.) Later, Kios was sunk off Athens on 22 April, Kyzikos at Salamis on 24 April, Pergamos off Salamis on 25 April, and Kydoniai south of the Peloponnese peninsula on the following day, all by German aircraft.

The three Romanian boats were initially deployed against the Soviet Navy Black Sea Fleet following the launch of Operation Barbarossa in June 1941. Năluca took part in the sinking of one Soviet submarine near Mangalia on 9 July 1941, but was herself sunk by Soviet aircraft at Constanța on 20 August 1944. Sborul and Smeul survived World War II, having been transferred to the Soviet Black Sea Fleet in late August 1944 after Romania changed sides and joined the Allies, serving as Musson and Toros respectively.

The Yugoslav boats served in a coastal and second-line escort role with the Royal Italian Navy (Italian: Regia Marina) in the Adriatic under their Yugoslav designations, and were fitted with two 76 mm (3.0 in) L/30 anti-aircraft guns in place of their 66 mm guns, but no other significant alterations were made to them. After the Italians capitulated in September 1943, they transferred T1 back to the KJRM-in-exile in December of that year. (Note: One source states that she was captured by the Germans and transferred to the navy of the puppet state, the Independent State of Croatia (NDH), but several other sources state that she was returned to the KJRM in December 1943.) T3 was seized by the Germans at Rijeka on 16 September 1943 and was renamed TA48. She was commissioned on 15 August 1944, and was used for patrol and escort work in the northern Adriatic. The Germans added to her armament, fitting her with two single 20 mm (0.79 in) anti-aircraft guns in addition to the guns fitted by the Italians, and removing two of her torpedo tubes. There are two versions of how TA48 was employed. The first version indicates that she was crewed exclusively by Croatian officers and sailors, but remained under German control, and the second states that she was handed over to the Navy of the Independent State of Croatia, but was repossessed by the Germans on 14 December 1944 because they considered the Croatians unreliable. Her complement was also increased to 52 during her German-Croatian service. She was sunk in the port of Trieste by Allied aircraft on 20 February 1945. (Note: Sources conflict on who sank TA48. Gardiner and Lenton state that they were Allied aircraft without specifying their nationality, while Chesneau states they were British aircraft, and Wilmott states that US aircraft carried out the attack.)

T5 was also returned to the KJRM-in-exile in December 1943. T6 was scuttled by the Italians 30 km (19 mi) north of Rimini on 11 September as she had insufficient fuel on board to reach an Allied port. Once under German control, T7 was also handed over to the Navy of the Independent State of Croatia, and served under her Yugoslav designation. Her crew came under the influence of Yugoslav Partisan propaganda, and were preparing to mutiny when the Germans intervened. On 24 June 1944, she and the S-boats S 154 and S 157 of the 7th S-Boat Flotilla were sailing between Šibenik and Rijeka, protecting German sea supply routes along the Adriatic, when they were attacked by the Royal Navy Fairmile D motor torpedo boats MTB 659, MTB 662 and MTB 670 near the island of Kukuljari, south of Murter Island. The MTBs fired two torpedoes at T7, but missed, so they closed and engaged her with their guns, setting her ablaze. She was beached, and 21 crew were rescued by the MTBs. The British crews later examined the wreck, capturing five more crew, then destroyed her with demolition charges. T8 was sunk 37 km (23 mi) north-west of Dubrovnik by German aircraft while evacuating Italian troops from Dalmatia on 10 or 11 September 1943.

=== Post-World War II ===
Only four of the twenty-seven 250t-class torpedo boats survived World War II, two in Yugoslav service and two in Soviet service. T1 was commissioned by the Yugoslav Navy after the war as Golešnica. She was re-armed with two 40 mm (1.6 in) guns on single mounts and four 20 mm (0.79 in) guns, and her torpedo tubes were removed. She continued in Yugoslav service under that name until October 1959. T5 was also commissioned by the Yugoslav Navy after the war, and renamed Cer. She was fitted with two 40 mm (1.6 in) guns on single mounts and one 20 mm (0.79 in) gun, and her torpedo tubes were also removed. She served until 1962, when she was broken up. Musson and Toros were returned to Romania in October 1945, and stricken the following month. (Note: According to Greger, Toros survived the war and was scrapped in 1960.)
