= 110t-class torpedo boat =

Class of Austro-Hungarian torpedo boats

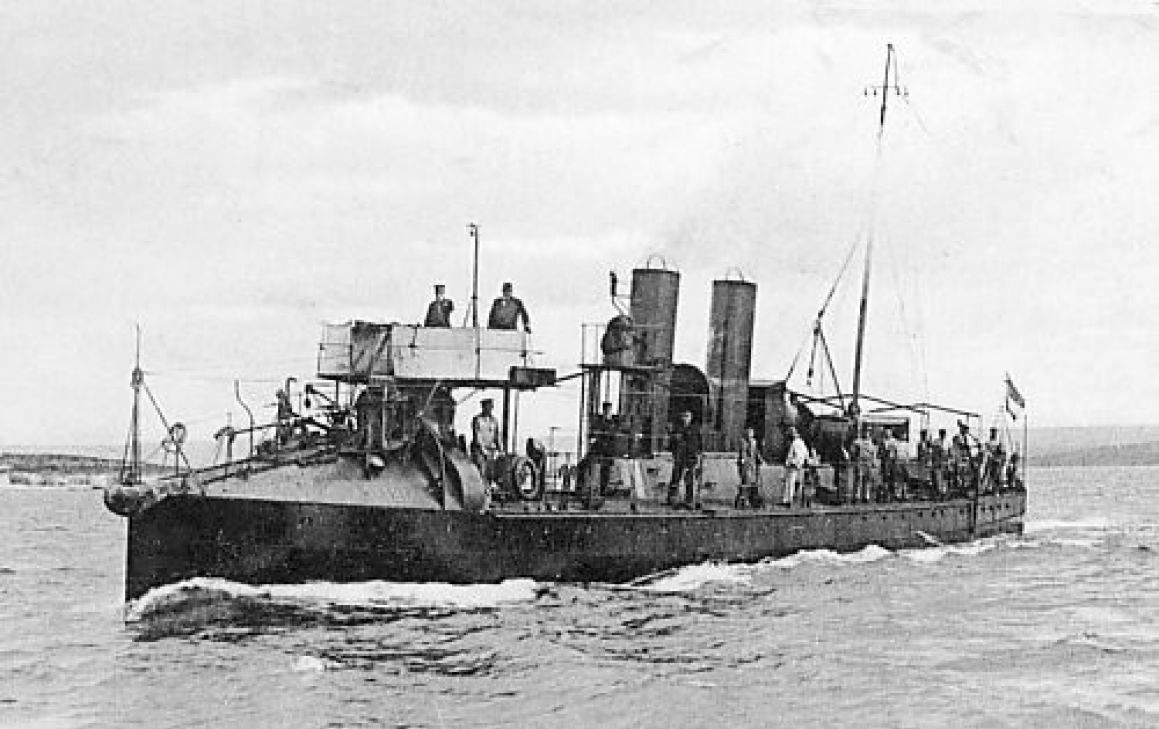
- SM Tb 1

Class overview
- Builders: STT, Trieste; Ganz & Danubius, Fiume
- Operators: Austro-Hungarian Navy; Regia Marina
- Succeeded by: 250t-class torpedo boat
- In commission: 1909–1926
- Completed: 12
- Scrapped: 12

General characteristics TB I type (STT)
- Type: Torpedo boat
- Displacement: 116 t (114 long tons) full load
- Length: 44.2 m (145 ft 0 in) wl
- Beam: 4.3 m (14 ft 1 in)
- Draught: 1.2 m (3 ft 11 in)
- Installed power: 2,500 ihp (1,900 kW)
- Propulsion: 2 × Yarrow boilers; 1 × triple-expansion steam engine
- Speed: 28 knots (52 km/h; 32 mph)
- Complement: 20
- Armament: 2× 47 mm (1.9 in) guns; 2 × 45 cm (17.7 in) torpedo tubes

The 110t class were a class of twelve coastal torpedo boats built for the Austro-Hungarian Navy between 1909 and 1911. They were built by two shipbuilders, the Austrian Stabilimento Tecnico Triestino and the Hungarian Ganz & Danubius, with six ships built each. They served through the First World War, with one of the ships, Tb 11, defecting to Italy in 1917. After the end of the war, several of the class were used by the Italian Navy and the Italian Customs Service, with the last example scrapped in 1926.

== Design ==
In 1905, the Austrian Naval Technical Committee proposed three designs for a 110 t coastal torpedo boat, differing in the machinery used, with steam turbines or vertical triple expansion engines to be used. By 1907, these had been refined to a single design, oil-fuelled but powered by a triple expansion engine as the designers had insufficient experience with turbines. This local design was compared with designs from the German shipyards Schichau-Werke and Krupp and the British shipyard Yarrow and was considered to be superior to the foreign designs.

It was initially planned for Stabilimento Tecnico Triestino (STT) to build eight ships at their Trieste shipyard, but it was required for political reasons that the work be divided between Austrian and Hungarian shipyards, and in the end six ships were built each at the Austrian STT shipyard and the Hungarian Ganz & Danubius yard at Fiume, with each shipbuilder building slightly different designs, with the Ganz & Danubius-built ships having different machinery in order to increase the Hungarian content in the ships.

The STT-built ships were 44.2 m (145 ft 0 in) long overall and 43.3 m (142 ft 1 in) at the waterline, with a beam of 4.4 m (14 ft 5 in) and a draught of 1.2 m (3 ft 11 in). Design displacement was 116 t (114 long tons). Two oil-fired Yarrow water-tube boilers fed steam to a three-cylinder vertical triple expansion engine, rated at 2,500 ihp (1,900 kW), which drove a single propeller shaft, giving a speed of 28 kn (32 mph; 52 km/h). (Note: Greger states a power of 2,300–2,600 ihp (1,700–1,900 kW) for the STT-built ships, giving a speed of 26 kn (30 mph; 48 km/h)) The Danubius-built ships had a greater draught (1.5 m (4 ft 11 in)) and used White-Forster boilers feeding steam to a triple-expansion engine rated at 2,400 ihp (1,800 kW), giving a speed of 26.5 kn (30.5 mph; 49.1 km/h). (Note: Greger states a power of 2,400–2,600 ihp (1,800–1,900 kW) for the Ganz-Danubius-built ships.)

Armament of all ships was two Škoda 47 mm (1.9 in) L/44 (Note: L/44 denotes the length of the gun. In this case, the L/44 gun is 44 calibre, meaning that the gun was 44 times as long as the diameter of its bore.) guns and two 450 mm (17.7 in) torpedo tubes. The ships had a crew of 20.

== Service ==
Construction of the ships began in April 1909, with deliveries starting at the end of that year, and continuing until May 1911. While in general the class proved adequately seaworthy, the inexperience of the Danubis shipyard resulted in their torpedo boats having a tendency to heel at high speeds owing to the torque of the single propeller. In 1910, Austria-Hungary's older coastal torpedo boats were redesignated, replacing their names with a number, and the 110t-class were renumbered, with their Roman numeral being replaced by an Arabic number.

At the outbreak of the First World War, the ships of the class were all serving in local coast defence forces, with four (Tb 1, Tb 2, Tb 7 and Tb 9) based at Pula as part of the 11th torpedo boat group, four (Tb 3, Tb 4, Tb 5 and Tb 6) based at Lussin as part of the 17th and 18th torpedo boat groups, and the remaining four (Tb 8, Tb 10, Tb 11 and Tb 12) at Šibenik to the as part of the 19th torpedo boat group. Duties included minesweeping, escort and anti-submarine operations.

On the night of 30/31 July 1916, the Italian submarine Giacinto Pullino ran aground at Galiola Island in the Kvarner Gulf. Tb 4, Tb 6 and the Torpedo gunboat Magnet helped to capture the submarine, which sank under tow the next day. In March 1917, five ships of the class (Tb 1, Tb 3, Tb 6, Tb 7 and Tb 9) were based at Pola, with two (Tb 2 and Tb 4) at Lussin and four (Tb 8, Tb 10, Tb 11 and Tb 12) at Šibenik. On 26 August 1917, Tb 4 and Tb 6 were transferred to Trieste together with the old battleships Budapest and Wien to support army operations.

On 5 October 1917, the crew of Tb 11 mutinied, locking the ship's officers in their cabin and taking the ship from Šibenik to the Italian coast, where they surrendered the ship. Tb 11 was incorporated in the Italian Navy as the Francesco Rismondo. On 16 November, Tb 6 and Tb 9 were part of an escort of 14 torpedo boats for Budapest and Wien when the two battleships bombarded shore batteries at Cortellazzo. On 26 August 1918, six ships (Tb 1, Tb 2, Tb 3, Tb 5, Tb 6 and Tb 9) were based at Pola, while four more (Tb 8, Tb 10, Tb 12 and Tb 14) were based at Šibenik and one (Tb 4 at Trieste).

The ships were allocated to the Allies under the Treaty of Saint-Germain-en-Laye after the end of the war. Four ships (Tb 6, Tb 8, Tb 9 and Tb 10) were allocated to Great Britain, but were sold for scrap and broken up in 1920, while the remaining ships were allocated to Italy. Tb 1, Tb 2, Tb 4 and Tb 5 were scrapped in 1920, while Tb 12 was scrapped in 1922. Tb 3 and Tb 7 were operated by the Italian Customs Service, serving until 1925 and 1926 respectively, while Francesco Rismondo remained in service with the Italian Navy until 1925.

== Ships ==
Ship	Builder	Laid down	Launched	Completed	Notes
I	STT	9 April 1909	12 August 1909	31 December 1909	Renamed Tb 1 in 1910. To Italy 1920 and scrapped.
II	STT	20 April 1909	27 September 1909	31 December 1909	Renamed Tb 2 in 1910. To Italy 1920 and scrapped.
III	STT	5 May 1909	8 November 1909	31 December 1909	Renamed Tb 3 in 1910. To Italy 1920. Used by Italian customs until 1925
IV	STT	7 May 1909	2 December 1909	31 December 1909	Renamed Tb 4 in 1910. To Italy 1920 and scrapped.
V	STT	20 May 1909	30 December 1909	24 February 1910	Renamed Tb 5 in 1910. To Italy 1920 and scrapped.
VI	STT	22 May 1909	January 1910	30 December 1910	Renamed Tb 6 in 1910. To Italy 1920. Used by Italian customs until 1926.
VII	Ganz-Danubius	13 July 1909	30 December 1909	29 July 1910	Renamed Tb 7 in 1910. To Italy 1920 and scrapped.
VIII	Ganz-Danubius	11 August 1909	24 February 1910	20 May 1910	Renamed Tb 8 in 1910. To Great Britain 1920 and scrapped in Italy.
IX	Ganz-Danubius	28 August 1909	22 March 1910	20 May 1910	Renamed Tb 9 in 1910. To Great Britain 1920 and scrapped in Italy.
X	Ganz-Danubius	1 October 1909	14 May 1910	13 July 1910	Renamed Tb 10 in 1910. To Great Britain 1920 and scrapped in Italy.
XI	Ganz-Danubius	23 October 1909	24 May 1910	31 December 1910	Renamed Tb 11 in 1910. Defected to Italy 1917. Operated by Italian Navy as Francesco Rismondo until 1925.
XII	Ganz-Danubius	10 November 1909	31 May 1910	23 May 1911	Renamed Tb 12 in 1910. To Italy 1920. Scrapped 1922.
