= Yugoslav submarine Hrabri =

Yugoslav submarine built in 1927

Hrabri
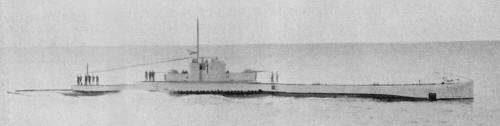
- Hrabri underway in 1934

History

Kingdom of Yugoslavia
- Name: Hrabri
- Namesake: Brave
- Builder: Vickers-Armstrong Naval Yard, River Tyne, United Kingdom
- Launched: 1927
- In service: 1927–1941
- Out of service: 1941
- Fate: Scrapped by the Royal Italian Navy

General characteristics
- Class & type: Hrabri-class diesel-electric submarine
- Displacement: 975 long tons (991 t) (surfaced); 1,164 long tons (1,183 t) (submerged)
- Length: 72.1 m (236 ft 7 in) (oa)
- Beam: 7.31 m (24 ft)
- Draught: 4 m (13 ft)
- Propulsion: 2 × shafts; 2 × diesel engines 2,400 bhp (1,800 kW); 2 × electric motors 1,600 shp (1,200 kW)
- Speed: 15.7 knots (29.1 km/h; 18.1 mph) (diesel); 10 knots (19 km/h; 12 mph) (electric)
- Range: 5,000 nautical miles (9,300 km; 5,800 mi) at 9 knots (17 km/h; 10 mph) (surfaced)
- Test depth: 60 m (200 ft)
- Complement: 47
- Armament: 6 × 533 mm (21 in) torpedo tubes (bow); 12 × torpedoes; 2 × 102 mm (4 in) Mark IV L/40 guns; 1 × QF 2-pounder (40 mm (1.6 in)) L/39 anti-aircraft gun; 2 × machine guns

Hrabri (Brave) was the lead boat of the Hrabri-class submarines; built for the Kingdom of Serbs, Croats and Slovenes– Yugoslavia by the Vickers-Armstrong Naval Yard in the United Kingdom. Launched in 1927, her design was based on the British L-class submarine of World War I, and was built using parts from an L-class submarine that was never completed. The Hrabri-class were the first submarines to serve in the Royal Yugoslav Navy (KM), (Note: This translates to Serbo-Croatian Latin: Kraljevska mornarica; Serbo-Croatian Cyrillic: Краљевска морнарица. The navy's "KM" initialism is derived from these.) and after extensive sea trials and testing Hrabri sailed from the UK to the Adriatic coast of Yugoslavia, arriving in April 1928. The submarine was armed with six bow-mounted 533 mm (21 in) torpedo tubes, two 102 mm (4 in) deck guns, one QF 2-pounder (40 mm (1.6 in)) L/39 anti-aircraft gun and two machine guns. Its maximum diving depth was restricted to 55 metres (180 ft) by Yugoslav naval regulations.

Prior to World War II, Hrabri participated in cruises to Mediterranean ports. In 1933–1934 she was refitted, her superstructure was extensively modified and the 2-pounder gun was replaced with a single 13.2 mm (0.52 in) Hotchkiss M1929 anti-aircraft machine gun. By 1938 the class was considered to be obsolete, but efforts to replace them with modern German coastal submarines were stymied by the advent of World War II, and Hrabri remained in service. Immediately before the April 1941 German-led Axis invasion of Yugoslavia, Hrabri conducted patrols in the Adriatic Sea, and was then captured by Italian forces. She was given the number N3, but after an inspection she was scrapped.

== Background ==
The naval policy of the Kingdom of Serbs, Croats and Slovenes (the Kingdom of Yugoslavia from 1929) lacked direction until the mid-1920s, although it was generally accepted by the armed forces that the Adriatic coastline was effectively a sea frontier that the naval arm was responsible for securing with the limited resources made available to it. In 1926, a modest ten-year construction program was initiated to build up a force of submarines, coastal torpedo boats, and torpedo and conventional bomber aircraft to perform this role. The Hrabri-class submarines were one of the first new acquisitions aimed at developing a naval force capable of meeting this challenge.

Hrabri (Brave) was built for the Kingdom of Serbs, Croats and Slovenes by the Vickers-Armstrong Naval Yard, on the River Tyne, in the United Kingdom. Her design was based on the British L-class submarine of World War I, and she was built using parts originally assembled for HMS L67, which was not completed due to the end of World War I. The British Royal Navy (RN) cancelled the order for L67 in March 1919, and the partially constructed hull was launched on 16 June to free up the slipways on which it was being built. In November the hull was sold by the RN to the shipyard, and once the contract with the Yugoslavs was signed they were brought back onto the slipways and completed to a modified design. The British boats were chosen for two reasons: a visit to the Kingdom of Serbs, Croats and Slovenes by HMS L53 in 1926, and a British credit for naval purchases which included spending some of the funds in British shipyards.

The L-class boats were an improved version of the British E class and achieved a better relationship between displacement, propulsion, speed and armament than their predecessors, including a powerful armament of both torpedoes and guns. The class was designed for operations in the North Sea in World War I, but due to their considerable range they were deployed around the world during the interwar period by the RN, including in the Mediterranean, and three were still in service at the outbreak of World War II.

== Description and construction ==
=== General ===
Like her sister submarine Nebojsa, Hrabri was of a single hull design with a straight stem, circular cross section and narrow pointed stern. The ballast and fuel tanks were configured as saddle tanks, one along each side, tapered at either end. The keel was straight until it inclined upwards as part of the pointed stern, and a detachable ballast keel was also fitted. The submarine had two shafts each driving a three-bladed propeller, and boat direction was controlled using a semi-balanced rudder. The forward hydroplanes were positioned about 8 m (26 ft) aft of the bow, and the aft set were positioned aft of the propellers. The two anchors could be lowered from vertical tubes in the bow. The boat had a narrow steel-plated deck, and a tall, long and narrow conning tower with a navigation bridge positioned in the centre of the deck. Both fore and aft and at the same level as the conning tower were gun platforms protected by high bulwarks. The superstructure was partially raised both fore and aft of the gun platforms, with the torpedo hatch and a small torpedo crane forward, and the machinery hatches aft. Aft of the machinery hatches was a small step down which ran to 15 m (49 ft) short of the stern and contained a small ship's boat. The deck was too narrow and slippery for the crew to walk along it while underway.

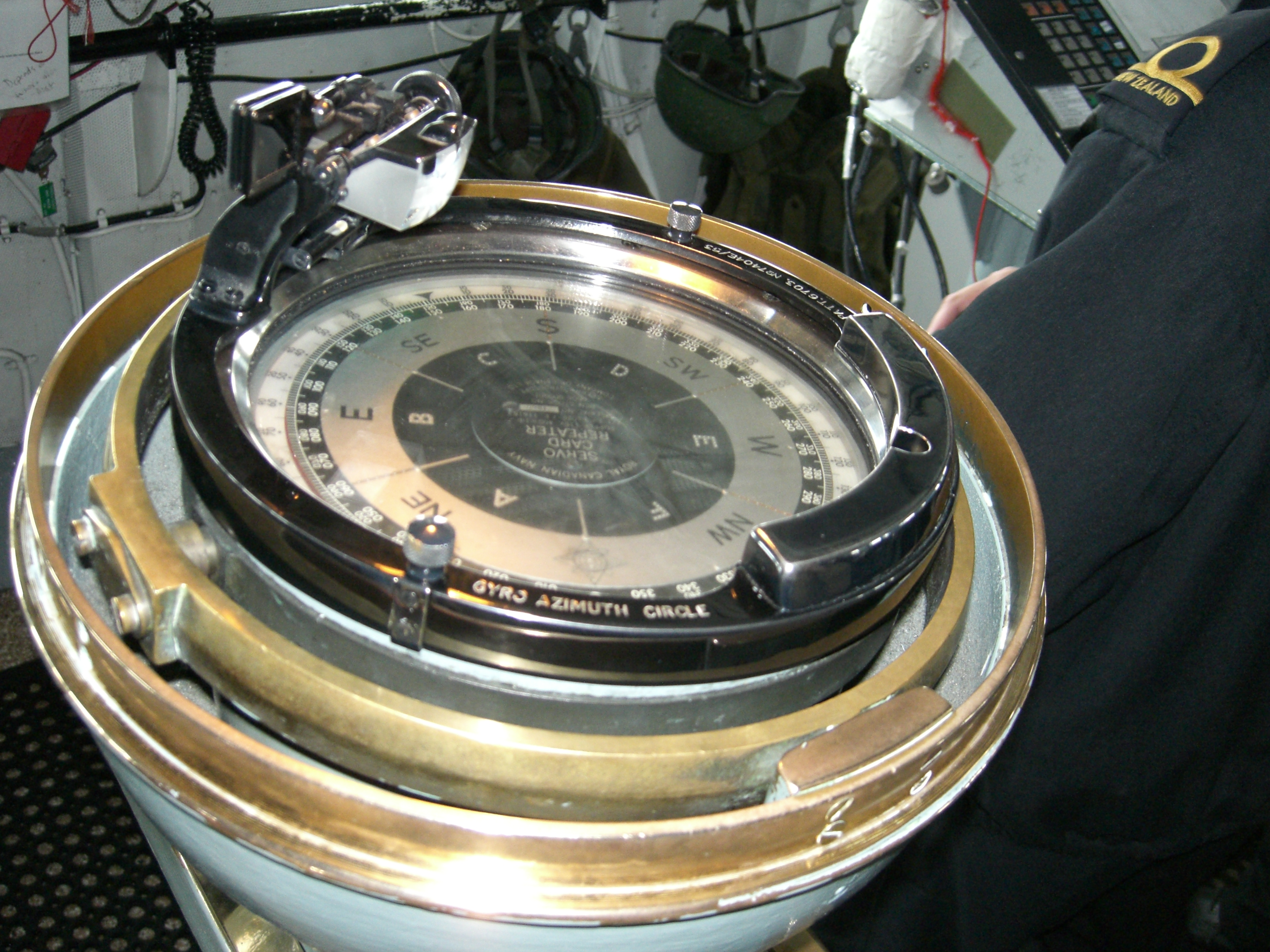
One of the Yugoslav-initiated inclusions on Hrabri was the installation of a gyrocompass salvaged from a former Austro-Hungarian ship.

Internally, transverse bulkheads divided the hull into seven watertight compartments. The first two compartments housed the torpedo tubes and reserve torpedoes, respectively, along with sleeping accommodation for some of the crew. The forward trim tanks were located underneath these two compartments. The upper levels of the third and fourth compartments contained accommodations for the officers and additional crew, respectively, and the lower levels each contained 112-cell electric batteries. In the middle of the boat, underneath the conning tower, was the control room. Aft of that, the fifth compartment was taken up by the machinery room, containing two diesel engines for surface running. Underneath that were diesel fuel tanks. The sixth compartment contained two electric motors on the upper level and an electric battery compartment with another 112 cells on the lower level. At the stern, the seventh compartment contained the steering machinery on the upper level and the aft trim tanks on the lower level.

Several innovations distinguished Hrabri and her sister boat from the original L-class design. At the suggestion of Yugoslav naval officers, gyrocompasses salvaged from former Austro-Hungarian Navy ships were fitted. A central pumping station was also installed, allowing for all ballast tanks to be blown at once from a single position. This enhancement saved the boats from sinking at least twice during their service. The final difference was that one of the three periscopes was modified to enable observation of the skies to warn of impending air attacks.

Hrabri had an overall length of 72.1 metres (236 ft 7 in), a beam of 7.31 m (24 ft), and a surfaced draught of 4 m (13 ft). Her surfaced displacement was 975 long tons (991 t) or 1,164 long tons (1,183 t) submerged. Her crew initially consisted of five officers and 42 enlisted men, but by 1941 this had increased to six officers and 47 enlisted men. She had a diving depth of 50–70 m (160–230 ft), but Yugoslav naval regulations restricted her to a maximum depth of 55 m (180 ft). Hrabri was expected to dive to periscope depth in 70 seconds, but at one point her crew achieved this in 52 seconds.

=== Propulsion ===
For surface running, Hrabri was powered by two Vickers V12 diesel engines designed in 1912 that were rated at a combined 2,400 brake horsepower (1,800 kW) at 380 rpm. Each engine weighed 33.8 t (33.3 long tons; 37.3 short tons), was made up of six parts, each of which held two cylinders. The parts were held together by screws. The screws were subject to great stress during navigation in rough weather, and they often cracked. This was a severe burden on the engine crew, as the work to replace them was exhausting, and forced the navy to stock the boats with a significant number of spare screws, adding significant weight. The naval historian Zvonimir Freivogel states that on a 15-day Mediterranean cruise, Nebojša needed 420 kg (930 lb) of replacement screws.

A total of 76 t (75 long tons; 84 short tons) of fuel was carried, 15 t (15 long tons; 17 short tons) in each of the saddle tanks and the rest inside the hull. As the fuel in the saddle tanks was used it was replaced with sea water to maintain displacement, buoyancy and trim. Hrabri could reach a top speed of 15.7 knots (29.1 km/h; 18.1 mph) on the surface, less than the contract speed of 17.5 kn (32.4 km/h; 20.1 mph). On the surface using the diesel engines, she had a range of 5,000 nautical miles (9,300 km; 5,800 mi) at 9 knots (17 km/h; 10 mph).

When submerged, the two propeller shafts were driven by two electric motors generating a total of 1,600 shaft horsepower (1,200 kW) at 300 rpm. Hrabri also had a small 20 bhp (15 kW) electric motor for silent underwater running. The battery storage consisted of three hundred and thirty-six 3820 LS Exide cells, which had a combined weight of 138 t (136 long tons; 152 short tons). She could reach 10 kn (18.5 km/h; 11.5 mph) on her electric motors when submerged, again less than the contract speed of 10.5 knots (19.4 km/h; 12.1 mph). With the silent running motor, she could achieve a nominal speed of 1.7 to 1.8 kn (3.1 to 3.3 km/h; 2.0 to 2.1 mph) underwater. Underwater, Hrabri had a range of 200 nmi (370 km; 230 mi) at 2 kn (3.7 km/h; 2.3 mph).

=== Armament ===
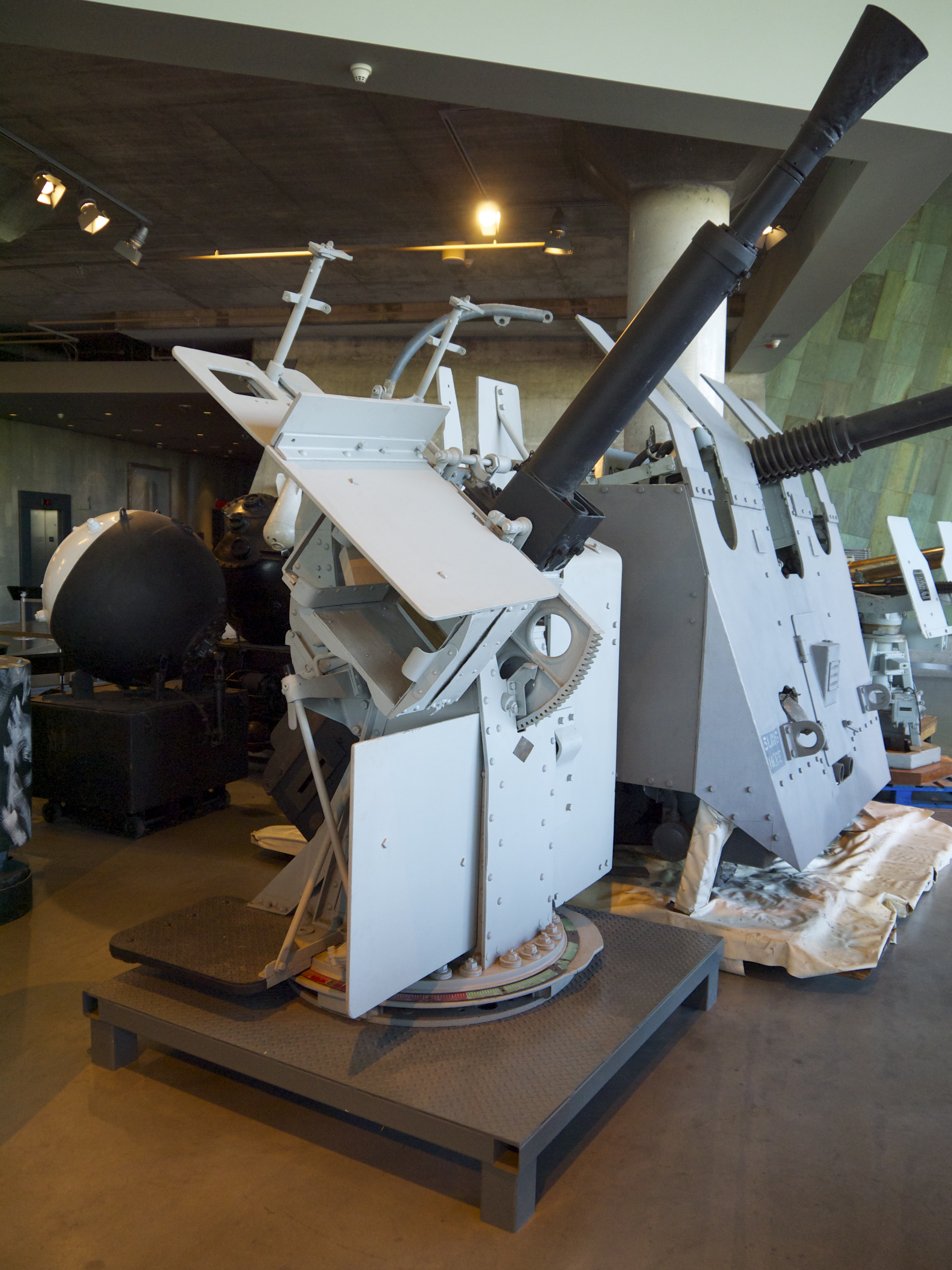
Hrabri was equipped with a single Vickers QF 2-pounder (40 mm (1.6 in)) L/39 gun as her principal anti-aircraft weapon

Hrabri was fitted with six bow-mounted 533 mm (21 in) torpedo tubes and carried twelve Whitehead-Weymouth Mark IV torpedoes, six in the tubes and six reloads. She was also equipped with two 102 mm (4 in) Mark IV L/40 guns, one in each of the mounts forward and aft of the bridge. Each gun weighed 1,200 kg (2,600 lb). Due to the raised gun platforms and protective bulwarks, the guns could be brought into action before the submarine reached full buoyancy and the crews could work them in heavy seas without the danger of being washed overboard. The guns could fire a 14 kg (31 lb) shell up to twelve times a minute to a maximum range of 9,560 m (31,360 ft). Until the destroyer leader Dubrovnik was commissioned in 1932, the Hrabri-class boats had the heaviest armament of any Royal Yugoslav Navy vessel.

=== Modifications in Yugoslav service ===
On arrival in the Adriatic, Hrabri was fitted with a single Vickers QF 2-pounder (40 mm (1.6 in)) L/39 anti-aircraft gun and two anti-aircraft machine guns. The Vickers gun fired a 0.76 kg (1.7 lb) shell to a maximum horizontal range of 6,000 m (20,000 ft) and a maximum vertical range of 4,000 m (13,000 ft). During service the Exide battery cells were replaced with Tudor SHI-37 battery cells. Between 1933 and 1934 Hrabri's superstructure underwent a significant rebuild. The conning tower was reduced in size, the corners were rounded and a bulwark was installed that enclosed the forward part of the towers. At the same time the main gun mounts were lowered and the 2-pounder was removed and replaced with a 13.2 mm (0.52 in) Hotchkiss M1929 anti-aircraft machine gun, which had a maximum horizontal range of 4,000 m (13,000 ft) and a maximum vertical range of 3,000 m (9,800 ft). From this point, Hrabri's silhouette was similar to the British R-class submarine.

== Service history ==
Hrabri was launched on 15 April with the tactical number 1, which was painted centrally on each side of the conning tower. During her sea trial Hrabri was accidentally rammed by the British tug Conqueror, although damage to her was slight. When trial diving on another occasion, Hrabri listed sharply to starboard and the bulwark around the bridge was damaged by waves. Many of her external details were modified by Vickers in an attempt to achieve the contract speeds. These modifications included closing and remodelling of hull openings and flood slits and using thinner hydroplanes. These changes were to no avail, and by way of compensation Vickers installed a battery charger in the submarine tender Hvar at their own expense. The trial and training phase was extensive, and once it was completed, Hrabri and Nebojša sailed to Portland where they took onboard their complement of torpedoes, before returning to Newcastle.

=== Interwar period ===
The two boats left the Tyne on 11 March 1928 in company with Hvar. En route one of the submarines suffered from engine trouble and the group had a five-day stopover at Gibraltar for repairs. They then had a five-day visit to Algiers in French Algeria and a brief stop at Malta before arriving at Tivat in the Bay of Kotor on the southern Adriatic coast on 5 April. Torpedo exercises for the two boats followed, and then a cruise along the Adriatic coast. On 16 August a serious accident was averted aboard Hrabri in the narrow harbour entrance at Šibenik in central Dalmatia. The boat's rudder jammed, but the reserve steering mechanism was started quickly and the boat brought safely through. In May and June 1929, Hrabri, Nebojša, Hvar and six 250t class torpedo boats accompanied the light cruiser Dalmacija on a cruise to Malta, the Greek island of Corfu in the Ionian Sea, and Bizerte in the French protectorate of Tunisia. According to the British naval attaché, the ships and crews made a very good impression while visiting Malta. On 9 December 1929, the two Osvetnik-class submarines joined the KM, completing the submarine flotilla.

In mid-1930, Hrabri, Nebojša and the Sitnica cruised the Mediterranean, visiting Alexandria in Egypt and Beirut in Lebanon. Over the next several years, the submarines engaged in a cycle of summer cruises followed by repairs and refits in the winter months. In 1932, the British naval attaché reported that Yugoslav ships engaged in few exercises, manoeuvres or gunnery training due to reduced budgets. In 1933, the attaché reported that the naval policy of Yugoslavia was strictly defensive, aimed at protecting her more than 600 km (370 mi) of coastline. On 4 October 1934, Hrabri and the Osvetnik-class boat Smeli commenced a training cruise in the Mediterranean involving sailing around Sicily independently and meeting at Bizerte. When King Alexander was assassinated in Marseille in France on 9 October, they were ordered to return home and reached Tivat on 13 October.

From March 1935 to September 1936, Josip Černi was Hrabri's commanding officer; Černi went on to become the commander-in-chief of the Partisan Navy during World War II. In 1937, Hrabri participated in a cruise through the eastern Mediterranean along with Smeli, the flotilla leader Dubrovnik and the seaplane tender Zmaj. The ships continued on to Istanbul in Turkey, but the two submarines returned to Tivat. The crews of all four vessels were commended for their good behaviour during the cruise. By 1938, the KM had determined that the Hrabri-class boats were worn out and obsolete and needed replacement. In October two German Type IIB coastal submarines were ordered to replace them. The outbreak of World War II less than a year later meant that the ordered boats were never delivered and the Hrabri class had to continue in service. During the interwar period, Yugoslavia was a divided country dominated by Serb elites who essentially disregarded the rights and needs of the other constituent nations, and most Yugoslavs lacked a sense of having a share in the country's future. The Yugoslav military largely reflected this division, few considering interwar Yugoslavia worth fighting or dying for.

=== World War II ===
When the German-led Axis invasion of Yugoslavia commenced on 6 April 1941, the entire submarine flotilla was docked in the Bay of Kotor. A few days before the invasion, the KM deployed two submarines each night to patrol the coastline, primarily on the surface. They deployed Nebojša and Osvetnik together, and rotated them on each succeeding night with Hrabri and Smeli. On the day of the invasion Italian bombers attacked KM vessels in the Bay of Kotor. Hrabri and Osvetnik received orders to support a planned attack on the Italian enclave at Zara, but when this was cancelled Hrabri remained in the Bay of Kotor. The commanding officer of Sitnica was willing to take command of Hrabri and captain the boat to Greece, but the crew were opposed to this action, and Hrabri was captured at the Bay of Kotor by the Italians after the Yugoslav surrender came into effect on 18 April. Hrabri was designated N3 by the Italians and towed to Pola for inspection. Due to her poor condition, the Italians decided not to commission her and she was scrapped later that year. In April 2013, the 85th anniversary of Hrabri's arrival at the Bay of Kotor was marked by an event in Tivat, attended by dozens of former Yugoslav submariners.

== See also ==
- List of ships of the Royal Yugoslav Navy
