= Lake Prokljan =

- Prokljansko jezero, Prukljansko jezero (Croatian)
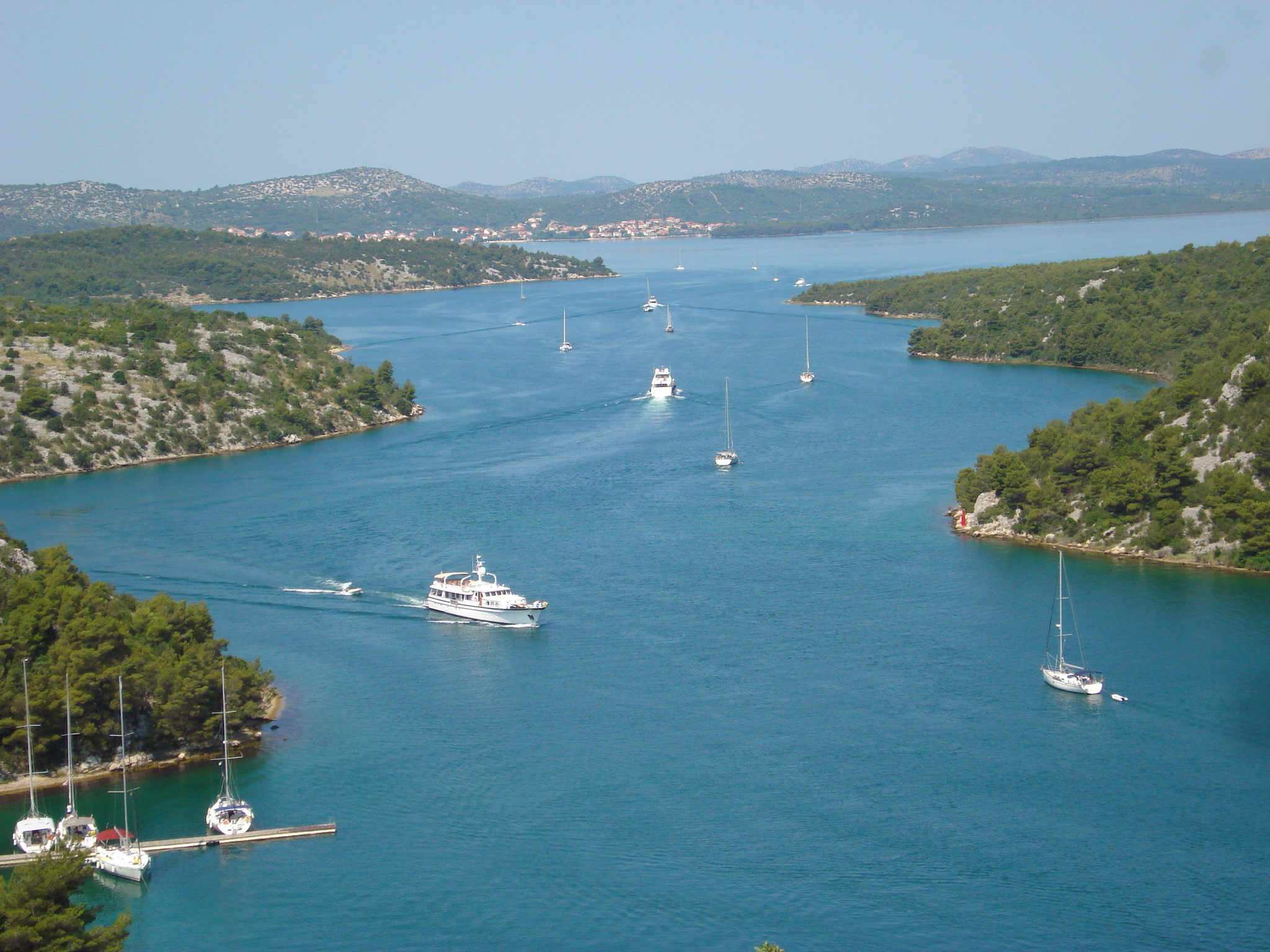
- Krka River entering Prokljan Lake from the northeast

- Location within Croatia
- Interactive map of Lake Prokljan
- Location: Dalmatia, Croatia
- Coordinates: 43°49′N 15°52′E
- Type: lake

Lake Prokljan (Croatian: Prokljansko jezero, Prukljansko jezero) is a lake in the Croatian region of Dalmatia, located near the cities of Skradin and Šibenik.

== Geography ==
The lake is situated in the lower reaches of the river Krka, and it covers an area of 11.1 square kilometres (4.3 sq mi). It is not entirely closed, but is connected to the sea by a narrow channel which leads to Šibenik harbor. Its elevation above sea level is 0.5 metres (1.6 ft) while its maximum depth is 25 metres (82 ft).

Despite its connection to the sea, it does not have high salinity: in the lower layers its water is salty, and near the surface it is freshwater. The northern part of the lake is quite shallow, with an average depth of about 4 meters, while the southern part is deeper, with some 20 to 25 meters.

The lake's major tributary is the Krka River, which has its source near the border with Bosnia and Herzegovina, flows through Knin and enters Prokljansko jezero near the city of Skradin.

== Miscellaneous ==
In the northern part of the lake, there is a small islet called Stipanac, a site with ruins dating from antiquity to medieval times.

== Commerce ==
The lake is one of the local tourist attractions, especially owing to its rich offer of local specialties, such as eel and fish (čokalica and golac) in the nearby villages of Raslina, Prokljan, Zaton and Bilice. Another very popular tourist destination is Krka National Park, situated some fifteen kilometers from Skradin, which attracts about 700,000 visitors every year.
