= Zaton, Zadar County =

Zaton Lago
- Village
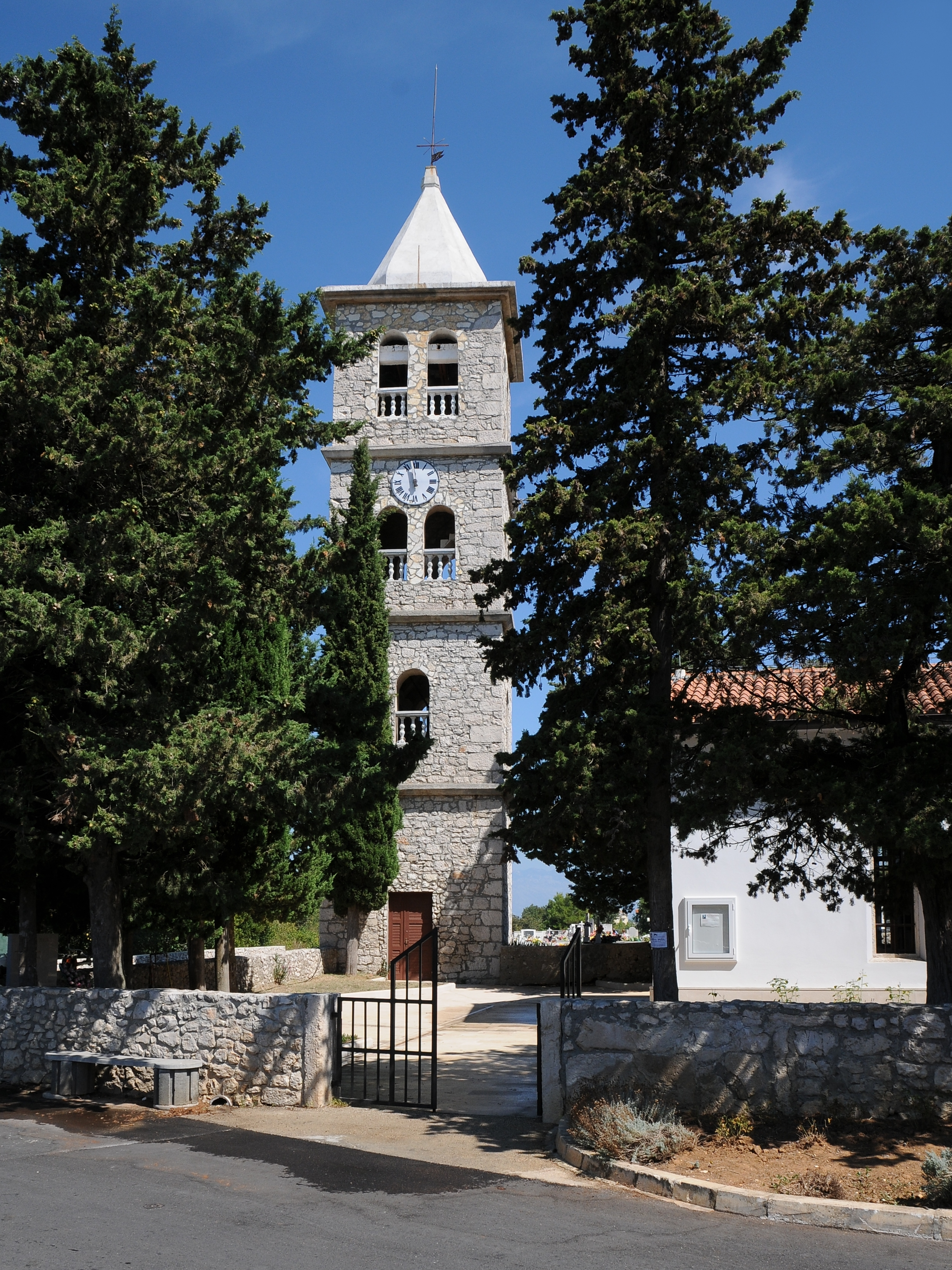
- Church in Zaton
- Interactive map of Zaton
- Location within Croatia
- Country: Croatia
- County: Zadar County

Area
  - Total: 9.3 km^{2} (3.6 sq mi)

Population (2021)
  - Total: 595
  - Density: 64/km^{2} (170/sq mi)
- Time zone: UTC+1 (CET)
  - Summer (DST): UTC+2 (CEST)

Zaton is a village in Croatia.

== Population ==
- 2001: 536
- 2011: 580
- 2021: 595
