= Yugoslav torpedo boat T1 =

Austro-Hungarian then Yugoslav torpedo boat operating between 1921 and 1959

T1
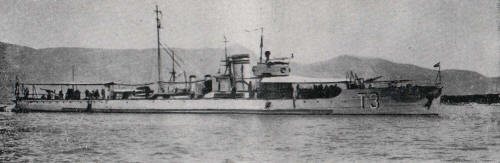
- One of T1's sister ships, T3

History

Austria-Hungary
- Name: 76 T then 76
- Builder: Stabilimento Tecnico Triestino
- Laid down: 24 June 1913
- Launched: 15 December 1913
- Commissioned: 23 August 1914
- Out of service: 1918
- Fate: Assigned to the Kingdom of Serbs, Croats and Slovenes

Kingdom of Yugoslavia
- Name: T1
- Acquired: March 1921
- Out of service: April 1941
- Fate: Captured by Italy

Italy
- Name: T1
- Acquired: April 1941
- Out of service: September 1943

Kingdom of Yugoslavia
- Name: T1
- Acquired: December 1943
- Fate: Transferred to Yugoslav Navy post-war

Federal People's Republic of Yugoslavia
- Name: Golešnica
- Acquired: post-World War II
- Stricken: 1955
- Fate: Sunk as a target

General characteristics
- Class & type: 250t-class, T-group sea-going torpedo boat
- Displacement: 262 t (258 long tons); 267.3 t (263 long tons) (full load)
- Length: 57.84 m (189 ft 9 in)
- Beam: 5.75 m (18 ft 10 in)
- Draught: 1.54 m (5 ft 1 in)
- Installed power: 5,000–5,700 shp (3,700–4,300 kW); 2 × Yarrow water-tube boilers
- Propulsion: 2 × shafts; 2 × Parsons steam turbines
- Speed: 28 knots (52 km/h; 32 mph)
- Range: 1,000 nmi (1,900 km; 1,200 mi) at 16 knots (30 km/h; 18 mph)
- Complement: 41 officers and enlisted
- Armament: 2 × Škoda 66 mm (2.6 in) L/30 guns; 4 × 450 mm (17.7 in) torpedo tubes; 1 × 8 mm (0.31 in) machine gun; 10–12 naval mines

T1 was a seagoing torpedo boat that was operated by the Royal Yugoslav Navy between 1921 and 1941. Originally 76 T, a 250t-class torpedo boat of the Austro-Hungarian Navy built in 1914, she was armed with two 66 mm (2.6 in) guns and four 450 mm (17.7 in) torpedo tubes, and could carry 10–12 naval mines. She saw active service during World War I, performing convoy, escort and minesweeping tasks, anti-submarine operations and shore bombardment missions. In 1917 the suffixes of all Austro-Hungarian torpedo boats were removed, and thereafter she was referred to as 76. She was part of the escort force for the Austro-Hungarian dreadnought Szent István during the action that resulted in the sinking of that ship by Italian torpedo boats in June 1918.

Following Austria-Hungary's defeat later that year, 76 was allocated to the Navy of the Kingdom of Serbs, Croats and Slovenes, which became the Royal Yugoslav Navy, and was renamed T1. At the time, she and seven other 250t-class boats were the only modern sea-going vessels of the fledgling maritime force. During the interwar period, T1 and the rest of the navy were involved in training exercises, but activity was limited by reduced naval budgets. The boat was captured by the Italians during the German-led Axis invasion of Yugoslavia in April 1941. After her main armament was modernised, she served with the Royal Italian Navy under her Yugoslav designation. Having escaped capture by German forces following the Italian capitulation in September 1943, she was returned to the Royal Yugoslav Navy-in-exile. She was commissioned by the Yugoslav Navy after World War II, and after a refit which included replacement of her armament, she served as Golešnica until 1955. She was sunk as a target in Žanjica Bay near the western entrance to the Bay of Kotor, and is now a recreational dive site.

== Background ==
In 1910, the Austria-Hungary Naval Technical Committee initiated the design and development of a 275-tonne (271-long-ton) coastal torpedo boat, specifying that it should be capable of sustaining 30 knots (56 km/h; 35 mph) for 10 hours. At the same time, the committee issued design parameters for a high seas or fleet torpedo boat of 500–550 t (490–540 long tons), top speed of 30 kn and endurance of 480 nautical miles (890 km; 550 mi). This design would have been a larger and better-armed vessel than the existing Austro-Hungarian 400-tonne (390-long-ton) Huszár-class destroyers. The specification for the high seas torpedo boat was based on an expectation that the Strait of Otranto, where the Adriatic Sea meets the Ionian Sea, would be blockaded by hostile forces during a future conflict. In such circumstances, there would be a need for a torpedo boat that could sail from the Austro-Hungarian Navy (German: kaiserliche und königliche Kriegsmarine, Hungarian: Császári és Királyi Haditengerészet) base at the Bocche di Cattaro (the Bocche or Bay of Kotor) to the strait during the night, locate and attack blockading ships and return to port before morning. Steam turbine power was selected for propulsion, as diesels with the necessary power were not available, and the Austro-Hungarian Navy did not have the practical experience to run turbo-electric boats. Despite having developed these ideas, the Austro-Hungarian Navy then asked shipyards to submit proposals for a 250 t (250-long-ton) boat with a maximum speed of 28 kn (52 km/h; 32 mph). Stabilimento Tecnico Triestino (STT) of Triest was selected for the contract to build eight vessels, the T group, ahead of one other tenderer. The T-group designation signified that they were built at Triest.

== Description and construction ==
The 250t-class, T-group boats had short raised forecastles and an open bridge, and were fast and agile, well designed for service in the Adriatic. They had a waterline length of 57.84 m (189 ft 9 in), a beam of 5.75 m (18 ft 10 in), and a normal draught of 1.54 m (5 ft 1 in). While their designed displacement was 262 tonnes (258 long tons), they displaced about 267.3 tonnes (263 long tons) fully loaded. The boats were powered by two Parsons steam turbines driving two propellers, using steam generated by two Yarrow water-tube boilers, one of which burned fuel oil and the other coal. There were two boiler rooms, one behind the other. The turbines were rated at 5,000–5,700 shaft horsepower (3,700–4,300 kW) and designed to propel the boats to a top speed of 28 kn (52 km/h; 32 mph), although a maximum speed of 29.2 kn (54.1 km/h; 33.6 mph) could be achieved. They carried 18.2 t (17.9 long tons) of coal and 24.3 t (23.9 long tons) of fuel oil, which gave them a range of 1,000 nautical miles (1,900 km; 1,200 mi) at 16 kn (30 km/h; 18 mph). The T group had one funnel rather than the two funnels of the later groups of the class. 76 T and the rest of the 250t class were classified as high seas torpedo boats by the Austro-Hungarian Navy, despite being smaller than the original concept for a coastal torpedo boat. The naval historian Zvonimir Freivogel states that this type of situation was common due to the parsimony of the Austro-Hungarian Navy. They were the first small Austro-Hungarian Navy boats to use turbines, and this contributed to ongoing problems with them, which had to be progressively solved once they were in service. The crew consisted of three officers and thirty-eight enlisted men. The vessel carried one 4 m (13 ft) yawl as a ship's boat.

The boats were originally to be armed with three Škoda 66 mm (2.6 in) L/30 (Note: L/30 denotes the length of the gun's barrel. In this case, the L/30 gun is 30 calibre, meaning that the barrel was 30 times as long as the diameter of its bore.) guns, and three 450 mm (17.7 in) torpedo tubes, but this was changed to two guns and four torpedo tubes before the first boat was completed, to standardise the armament with the F group to follow. A 40 cm (16 in) searchlight was mounted above the bridge. The torpedo tubes were mounted in pairs, with one pair mounted between the forecastle and bridge, and the other on a section of raised superstructure above the aft machinery room. They could also carry 10–12 naval mines.

The third of its class to be completed, 76 T was laid down on 24 June 1913, launched on 15 December 1913, completed on 20 July 1914, and commissioned on 23 August. Around the time of her commissioning, one 8 mm (0.31 in) Schwarzlose M.7/12 machine gun was included in the armament of all boats of the class for anti-aircraft work. Four mounting points were installed so that the machine gun could be mounted in the most effective position depending on the expected direction of attack. Until October 1915, the boat was painted black, but from that point it was painted a light blue-grey.

== Career ==
=== World War I ===
Following her commissioning, 76 T was part of the 1st Torpedo Group of the 3rd Torpedo Division of the Austro-Hungarian 1st Torpedo Flotilla. The original concept of operation for the 250t-class boats was that they would sail in a flotilla at the rear of a cruising battle formation, and were to intervene in fighting only if the battleships around which the formation was established were disabled, or in order to attack damaged enemy battleships. When a torpedo attack was ordered, it was to be led by a scout cruiser, supported by two destroyers to repel any enemy torpedo boats. A group of four to six torpedo boats would deliver the attack under the direction of the flotilla commander. As the 250t-class boats came into service, they joined the 1st Torpedo Flotilla, which was initially led by the Novara-class scout cruiser Saida and later by her sister Helgoland. The 1st Torpedo Flotilla initially included two divisions of destroyers (1st and 2nd) and a division of torpedo boats (3rd), which the 250t-class boats joined. Throughout the war, 76 T remained with the 3rd Torpedo Division of the 1st Torpedo Flotilla.

Not long after being commissioned, 76 T joined the rest of the 1st Torpedo Flotilla in an attempt to engage part of the French fleet operating in the southern Adriatic on 17 October 1914. The French were sailing in the vicinity of the island of Vis, but departed south during the night of 17/18 October, and the Austro-Hungarian flotilla was unable to launch an attack. On 15 and 16 March 1915, 76 T, along with the old destroyer Magnet and 250t-class boats 75 T and 79 T, escorted the newly commissioned dreadnought battleship Szent István from the main Austro-Hungarian naval base at Pola – in the upper Adriatic – to the island of Pago to conduct firing exercises. Led by Helgoland, the whole 1st Torpedo Flotilla steamed to the Ionian Sea over the period 11–15 April 1915 in search of the French fleet base, but the operation was unsuccessful.

Italy declared war on Austria-Hungary on 23 May 1915, and hostilities in the Adriatic, which had thus far mostly involved intermittent forays by the French fleet, immediately intensified. Almost the entire Austro-Hungarian fleet left Pola soon after the declaration to deliver an immediate response against Italian cities and towns along the Adriatic coast, aiming to interdict land and sea transport between southern Italy and the northern regions of that country which were expected to be a theatre of land operations. The fleet split into six groups with a range of targets up and down the coast. On 24 May, 76 T participated in this operation, known as the Bombardment of Ancona, which involved shelling of various Italian shore-based targets, with 76 T involved in the operation against Ancona itself, along with two squadrons of battleships, four destroyers, another four 250t-class boats, and thirteen Kaiman-class torpedo boats and six seaplanes. On 27 July, a flotilla led by the scout cruisers Admiral Spaun and Novara, and escorted by the Huszár-class destroyers Scharfschutze and Uskoke along with 76 T, 75 T and 79 T shelled the Italian railway line between Ancona and Pesaro. During this action, 76 T was engaged by coastal batteries near Ancona and was struck by a shell that failed to explode. In late November 1915, the Austro-Hungarian fleet deployed a force from Pola to the Bocche in the southern Adriatic; this force included six of the eight T-group torpedo boats. This force was tasked to maintain a permanent patrol of the Albanian coastline and interdict any troop transports crossing from Italy. During 1915, in addition to the operations mentioned above, 76 T also conducted three anti-submarine patrols and was often tasked with covering seaplanes returning from bombing missions over Italy.

On 4 January 1916, 76 T laid mines in the Bay of Triest. On 22 February 1916, 76 T, the Kaiman-class boat 70 F, and the 250t-class boats 77 T and 83 F laid a defensive minefield off the Montenegrin port of Antivari. On 3 May, 76 T, along with 92 F, 93 F, 98 M, 99 M and 100 M were accompanying the Huszár-class destroyers Csikós, Pandur, Velebit and Scharfschutze supporting seaplanes returning from an attack on Porto Corsini and Ravenna. During this mission they were involved in a surface action with an Italian force led by the flotilla leaders Cesare Rossarol and Guglielmo Pepe accompanied by the Rosolino Pilo-class destroyers Giuseppe Missori and Francesco Nullo. On this occasion the Austro-Hungarian force retreated behind a minefield with no damage to the torpedo boats. According to the naval historian Zvonimir Freivogel, although some sources state Csikós sustained splinter damage, this was not the case. In 1917, 76 T's forward 66 mm gun was placed on an anti-aircraft mount. On 21 May 1917, the suffix of all Austro-Hungarian torpedo boats was removed, and thereafter they were referred to only by the numeral. In June and July, Austro-Hungarian aircraft were constantly in action bombing various targets along the east coast of Italy. On a twenty-one seaplane raid targeting the harbour at Grado between Venice and Triest, and the main railway hub in the same area at Cervignano, 76 was part of the covering force which also included Scharfschutze and her sisters Turul and Dinara, and the 250t-class boats 80 T, 92 F and 96 F. Turul was targeted by an enemy submarine, but evaded the torpedo. On 13 October, 76 was transferred to the Bocche, and three days later she and Csikos escorted the German minelaying submarine SM UC-54 through the defensive minefield outside the harbour on her way to a minelaying mission off the coast of the French protectorate of Tunisia. On 21 October, 76 and the Kaiman-class boat 60 escorted the German submarine SM UB-40 on a mission to interdict shipping off the North African coast. On 2 November, 76 was transferred back to Pola.

On 1 February 1918, a mutiny broke out among the sailors of some vessels of the Austro-Hungarian Navy at the Đenovići anchorage within the Bocche, largely over poor food, lack of replacement uniforms and supplies, and insufficient leave, although the poor state of the Austro-Hungarian economy and its impact on their families was also a factor. As 76 was based at Pola at the time, her crew was not involved in the mutiny. On 3 May, 76 assisted the steamship Giulia which had stranded on Cape Marlera near Pola after being damaged by a mine. On 9 May, 76 and 79 along with several Huszár-class destroyers escorted the two Erzherzog Karl-class battleships, Erzherzog Ferdinand Max and Erzherzog Friedrich, to the Bocche. On 24 May, 76, along with the Kaiman-class boats 58 and 59, and the 250t-class boats 77, 78 and 97 conducted an anti-submarine operation targeting an unknown British submarine.

By 1918, the Allies had strengthened their ongoing blockade on the Strait of Otranto, as foreseen by the Austro-Hungarian Navy. As a result, it was becoming more difficult for the German and Austro-Hungarian U-boats to get through the strait and into the Mediterranean Sea. In response to these blockades, the new commander of the Austro-Hungarian Navy, Konteradmiral Miklós Horthy, decided to launch an attack on the Allied defenders with battleships, scout cruisers, and destroyers. During the night of 8 June, Horthy left Pola with the dreadnought battleships Viribus Unitis and Prinz Eugen. At about 23:00 on 9 June 1918, after some difficulties getting the harbour defence barrage opened, the dreadnoughts Szent István and Tegetthoff, escorted by the destroyer Velebit and six 250t-class torpedo boats, including 76, also departed Pola and set course for Slano, north of Ragusa, to rendezvous with Horthy in preparation for a coordinated attack on the Otranto Barrage. About 03:15 on 10 June, (Note: Sources differ on what the exact time was when the attack took place. Sieche states that the time was 3:15 am when the Szent István was hit, while Sokol claims that the time was 3:30 am.) while returning from an uneventful patrol off the Dalmatian coast, two Italian Navy (Italian: Regia Marina) MAS boats, MAS 15 and MAS 21, spotted the smoke from the Austrian ships. Both boats successfully penetrated the escort screen and split to engage the dreadnoughts individually. MAS 21 attacked Tegetthoff, but her torpedoes missed. The crew of 76 did not sight the MAS boats until they had launched their torpedoes. Under the command of Luigi Rizzo, MAS 15 fired two torpedoes at 03:25, both of which hit Szent István. Both boats evaded pursuit although Rizzo had to discourage 76 and 81 by dropping depth charges in his wake. The torpedo hits on Szent István were abreast her boiler rooms, which flooded, knocking out power to the pumps. Szent István capsized less than three hours after being torpedoed. This disaster essentially ended Austro-Hungarian fleet operations in the Adriatic for the remaining months of the war.

On 27 July, 76 towed the salvaged Austro-Hungarian submarine SM U-10 to Triest for repairs. On 12 October, 76 was transferred to the Bocche. On 14 October, 76 was part of a force which included her sisters 88, 97 and 100, providing anti-aircraft cover for the steamship Brünn as the latter was attempting to free the stranded hospital ship Oceania. Oceania had struck a mine and her crew had beached her off Cape Rodoni in Albania. The attempt was unsuccessful, and Oceania was abandoned. During 1918, 76 conducted five minesweeping missions, and escorted twenty-seven convoys. As the end of the war approached in November and the Austro-Hungarian Empire broke apart, the boat was based at the Bocche, and on 1 November it was ceded to the State of Slovenes, Croats and Serbs, which was a short-lived fragment of the empire which united with the Kingdom of Serbia and Kingdom of Montenegro on 1 December, becoming the Kingdom of Serbs, Croats and Slovenes (from 1929, the Kingdom of Yugoslavia).

=== Interwar period ===
The Austro-Hungarian Empire sued for peace in November 1918, and 76 survived the war intact. Immediately after the Austro-Hungarian capitulation, French troops occupied the Bocche, which was treated by the Allies as Austro-Hungarian territory. During the French occupation, the captured Austro-Hungarian Navy ships moored at the Bocche were neglected, and 76's original torpedo tubes were destroyed or damaged by French troops. In 1920, under the terms of the previous year's Treaty of Saint-Germain-en-Laye, by which rump Austria officially ended World War I, she was allocated to the Kingdom of Serbs, Croats and Slovenes (KSCS, later Yugoslavia). Along with three other 250t-class T-group boats, 77, 78 and 79, and four 250t-class F-group boats, she served with the Royal Yugoslav Navy (Serbo-Croatian Latin: Kraljevska Mornarica, KM; Краљевска Морнарица). Taken over in March 1921 when French forces withdrew, in KM service, 76 was renamed T1. When the navy was formed, she and the other seven 250t-class boats were the only modern sea-going vessels in the KM. New torpedo tubes of the same size were ordered from the Strojne Tovarne factory in Ljubljana.

In KM service it was intended to replace one or both guns on each boat of the 250t class with a longer Škoda 66 mm L/45 gun, and according to the naval historian Zvonimir Freivogel, this included the forward gun on T1. She was also fitted with one or two Zbrojovka 15 mm (0.59 in) machine guns. In KM service, the crew increased to 52, and she was commissioned in 1923. In 1925, exercises were conducted off the Dalmatian coast, involving the majority of the navy. T1 underwent a refit in 1927. In 1932, the British naval attaché reported that Yugoslav ships engaged in few exercises, manoeuvres or gunnery training due to reduced budgets. By 1939, the maximum speed achieved by the 250t class in Yugoslav service had declined to 24 kn (44 km/h; 28 mph).

=== World War II and post-war service ===
In April 1941, Yugoslavia entered World War II when it was invaded by the German-led Axis powers. At the time of the invasion, T1 was located at the Bay of Kotor along with her sister ship T8 (formerly 97). The two boats were formally part of the 3rd Torpedo Division, but they were left at Kotor when the rest of the division was deployed to the central Dalmatian port of Šibenik just prior to the invasion, in accordance with a plan to attack the Italian enclave of Zara in northern Dalmatia, which was quickly cancelled. T1 was captured by the Italian Navy shortly after the Yugoslav capitulation and was operated by them under her Yugoslav designation, conducting coastal and second-line escort duties in the Adriatic. Her guns were replaced by two 76 mm (3.0 in) L/40 anti-aircraft guns, and her bridge was enclosed. Her plain hull was also painted in a dazzle camouflage pattern. She was allocated to Maridalmazia, the military maritime command of Dalmatia (Comando militare marittimo della Dalmazia), which was responsible for the area from the northern Adriatic island of Premuda south to the port of Bar in the Italian governorate of Montenegro. On 21 January 1943, T1 was escorting the steamer Cassala near Cape Menders (current day Cape Mendra near Ulcinj, Montenegro, then part of the Italian protectorate of Albania) when they were attacked by the British submarine HMS Tigris. Tigris fired four torpedoes but missed both ships.

On 8 September 1943, immediately following the Italian capitulation, T1 entered the Bay of Kotor escorting the Italian tanker Annarella and freighter Milano, along with the Rosolino Pilo-class destroyer Giuseppe Cesare Abba. The German troops aboard Milano were permitted to land, but the Italians began evacuating their forces from the Bay of Kotor on the evening of 10 September. Several vessels departed for Allied ports in Italy or for Malta over the following day, including T1, Giuseppe Cesare Abba, the former Yugoslav Uskok-class torpedo boat ME47 and some auxiliary minesweepers, carrying about 400 Italian personnel. T1 was returned to the KM-in-exile at Malta on 7 December 1943. (Note: One source states that she was captured by the Germans and transferred to the navy of the puppet state, the Independent State of Croatia, but in addition to Freivogel, and Freivogel and Rastelli, several other sources state that she was returned to the KM in December 1943.) Along with the other ships of the KM-in-exile, T1 was transferred to the control of the government of the new Democratic Federal Yugoslavia in August 1945.

She was commissioned as Golešnica by the Yugoslav Navy (Serbo-Croatian Latin: Jugoslavenska Ratna Mornarica, JRM; Југословенска Pатна Mорнарица) initially as a stražarski brod (guard ship) with the designation SBR 91. She was later reclassified as a patrolni brod (patrol ship) with the designation PBR 91. Her post-war fit-out included replacing her guns with two Bofors 40 mm (1.6 in) L/60 guns on single mounts, one quadruple and one twin mount of Flakvierling 38 20 mm (0.79 in) guns, and one set of torpedo tubes were removed. She was fitted with two depth charge racks. In JRM service her maximum speed was 22 kn (41 km/h; 25 mph), her range amounted to 980 nmi (1,810 km; 1,130 mi) at 12 kn (22 km/h; 14 mph), and she had a crew of 52. Golešnica was allocated to the JRM's 6th Division, which largely consisted of escort destroyers, and was also employed in a training role, until she was struck off the naval register in 1955. After being decommissioned and disarmed, she was sunk as a target in Žanjica Bay near the western entrance to the Bay of Kotor and is now a recreational dive site. A set of her torpedo tubes is displayed at the Nikola Tesla Technical Museum in Zagreb, Croatia.

== See also ==
- List of ships of the Royal Yugoslav Navy
- List of ships of the Yugoslav Navy
