= Yugoslav torpedo boat T8 =

Yugoslav torpedo boat

T8
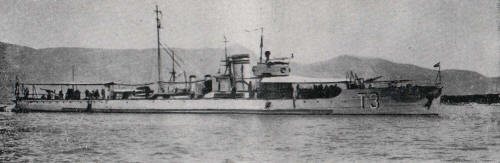
- T8's sister ship, T3, the only significant external difference was that T8 had two funnels

History

Austria-Hungary
- Name: 97 F then 97
- Builder: Ganz-Danubius
- Laid down: 5 March 1915
- Launched: 20 August 1916
- Commissioned: 9 December 1916
- Out of service: November 1918
- Fate: Assigned to the Kingdom of Serbs, Croats and Slovenes

Kingdom of Yugoslavia
- Name: T8
- Acquired: March 1921
- Out of service: April 1941
- Fate: Captured by Italy

Italy
- Name: T8
- Acquired: April 1941
- Out of service: September 1943
- Fate: Sunk by German aircraft 11 September 1943

General characteristics
- Class & type: 250t-class, F-group sea-going torpedo boat
- Displacement: 243.9 t (240 long tons); 267 t (263 long tons) (full load)
- Length: 58.76 m (192 ft 9 in)
- Beam: 5.84 m (19 ft 2 in)
- Draught: 1.5 m (4 ft 11 in)
- Installed power: 5,000–6,000 shp (3,700–4,500 kW); 2 × Yarrow water-tube boilers
- Propulsion: 2 × shafts; 2 × AEG-Curtis steam turbines
- Speed: 28–29 kn (52–54 km/h; 32–33 mph)
- Range: 1,200 nmi (2,200 km; 1,400 mi) at 16 kn (30 km/h; 18 mph)
- Complement: 41
- Armament: 2 × Škoda 66 mm (2.6 in) L/30 guns; 4 × 450 mm (17.7 in) torpedo tubes; 1 × 8 mm (0.31 in) machine gun; 10–12 naval mines

T8 was a sea-going torpedo boat operated by the Royal Yugoslav Navy between 1921 and 1941. Originally 97 F, a 250t-class torpedo boat of the Austro-Hungarian Navy built in 1915–1916, she was armed with two Škoda 66 mm (2.6 in) guns and four 450 mm (17.7 in) torpedo tubes and could carry 10–12 naval mines. She saw active service during World War I, performing convoy escort, patrol, and minesweeping tasks, as well as anti-submarine operations. In 1917, the suffixes of all Austro-Hungarian torpedo boats were removed, and thereafter she was referred to as 97.

Following Austria-Hungary's defeat in 1918, 97 was allocated to the Navy of the Kingdom of Serbs, Croats and Slovenes, which later became the Royal Yugoslav Navy, and renamed T8. At the time, she and the seven other 250t-class boats were the only modern sea-going vessels of the fledgling maritime force. During the interwar period, T8 and the rest of the navy were involved in training exercises and cruises to friendly ports, but activity was limited by constrained naval budgets. The boat was captured by the Italians during the German-led Axis invasion of Yugoslavia in April 1941. After her main armament was modernised, she served with the Royal Italian Navy under her Yugoslav designation, conducting coastal and second-line escort duties in the Adriatic Sea. Following the Italian capitulation in September 1943, T8 was sunk by German aircraft while attempting to escape to Allied-held southern Italy.

== Background ==
In 1910, the Austria-Hungary Naval Technical Committee initiated the design and development of a 275-tonne (271-long-ton) coastal torpedo boat, specifying that it should be capable of sustaining 30 knots (56 km/h; 35 mph) for 10 hours. At the same time, the committee issued design parameters for a high seas or fleet torpedo boat of 500–550 t (490–540 long tons), with a top speed of 30 kn and endurance of 480 nautical miles (890 km; 550 mi). This design would have been a larger and better-armed vessel than the existing Austro-Hungarian 400-tonne (390-long-ton) Huszár-class destroyers. The specification for the high seas torpedo boat was based on an expectation that the Strait of Otranto, where the Adriatic Sea meets the Ionian Sea, would be blockaded by hostile forces during a future conflict. In such circumstances, there would be a need for a torpedo boat that could sail from the Austro-Hungarian Navy (Note: German: kaiserliche und königliche Kriegsmarine; Hungarian: Császári és Királyi Haditengerészet) base at the Bocche di Cattaro (the Bocche or Bay of Kotor) to the strait during the night, locate and attack blockading ships and return to port before morning. Steam turbine power was selected for propulsion, as diesel engines with the necessary power were not available, and the Austro-Hungarian Navy did not have the practical experience to run turbo-electric boats.

Despite having developed these ideas, the Austro-Hungarian Navy then asked shipyards to submit proposals for a 250 t (250-long-ton) boat with a maximum speed of 28 kn (52 km/h; 32 mph). Stabilimento Tecnico Triestino (STT) of Triest was selected for the contract to build the first eight vessels, designated as the T-group. Another tender was requested for four more boats, but when Ganz-Danubius reduced their price by ten per cent, a total of sixteen boats were ordered from them, designated the F-group, which signified the location of Ganz-Danubius' main shipyard at Fiume.

== Description and construction ==
The 250t-class F-group boats had short raised forecastles and an open bridge, and were fast and agile, well designed for service in the Adriatic. They had a waterline length of 58.76 metres (192 ft 9 in), a beam of 5.84 m (19 ft 2 in), and a normal draught of 1.5 m (4 ft 11 in). While their designed displacement was 243.9 t (240 long tons), they displaced 267 tonnes (263 long tons) fully loaded. The boats were powered by two AEG-Curtis steam turbines driving two propellers, using steam generated by two Yarrow water-tube boilers, one of which burned fuel oil and the other coal. There were two boiler rooms, one behind the other. The turbines were rated at 5,000 shaft horsepower (3,700 kW) with a maximum output of 6,000 shp (4,500 kW) and were designed to propel the boats to a top speed of 28–29 kn (52–54 km/h; 32–33 mph). They carried 20.2 tonnes (19.9 long tons) of coal and 31 tonnes (30.5 long tons) of fuel oil, which gave them a range of 1,200 nautical miles (2,200 km; 1,400 mi) at 16 kn (30 km/h; 18 mph). The F-group had two funnels rather than the single funnel of the T-group. The crew consisted of three officers and thirty-eight enlisted men. The vessel carried one 4 m (13 ft) yawl as a ship's boat.

97 F and the rest of the 250t class were classified as high seas torpedo boats by the Austro-Hungarian Navy, despite being smaller than the original concept for a coastal torpedo boat. The naval historian Zvonimir Freivogel states that this type of situation was common due to the parsimony of the Austro-Hungarian Navy. The 250t class were the first small Austro-Hungarian Navy boats to use turbines and this contributed to ongoing problems with them, which were progressively solved once they were in service.

The boats were armed with two Škoda 66 mm (2.6 in) L/30 (Note: L/30 denotes the length of the gun's barrel. In this case, the L/30 gun is 30 calibre, meaning that the barrel was 30 times as long as the diameter of its bore.) guns, with the forward gun mounted on the forecastle, and the aft gun on the quarterdeck. A 40 cm (16 in) searchlight was mounted above the bridge. They were also armed with four 450 mm (17.7 in) torpedo tubes mounted in pairs, with one pair mounted between the forecastle and bridge, and the other aft of the mainmast. One 8 mm (0.31 in) Schwarzlose M.7/12 machine gun was carried for anti-aircraft work. Four mounting points were installed so that the machine gun could be mounted in the most effective position depending on the expected direction of attack. They could also carry 10–12 naval mines.

The sixteenth and last boat of the F-group to be completed at Ganz-Danubius' main shipyard at Fiume, 97 F was laid down on 5 March 1915, launched on 20 August 1916 and commissioned on 9 December.

== Career ==
=== World War I ===
The original concept of operation for the 250t-class boats had them sail in a flotilla at the rear of a cruising battle formation, and intervene in fighting only if the battleships around which the formation was established were disabled, or in order to attack damaged enemy battleships. When a torpedo attack was ordered, it was to be led by a scout cruiser, supported by two destroyers to repel any enemy torpedo boats. A group of four to six torpedo boats would deliver the attack under the direction of the flotilla commander.

Map of the Adriatic Sea showing the location of major ports and actions

In 1917, one of 97 F's 66 mm guns may have been placed on an anti-aircraft mount. According to the naval historian Zvonimir Freivogel, sources vary on whether these mounts were added to all boats of the class, and on whether these mounts were added to the forward or aft gun. In March, 97 F was allocated to the 5th Torpedo Boat Group of the 5th Torpedo Boat Division of the 1st Torpedo Flotilla, which was led by the scout cruiser Helgoland. On 21 May, the suffix of all Austro-Hungarian torpedo boats was removed, and they were thereafter referred to only by the numeral. On 14 July, the boat was sent to the Bocche. On 28 September, 97 supported an air attack on Brindisi in southern Italy. On 29 November, 97, 83, 96 and the Huszár-class destroyer Csikós were escorting the steamer Dalmatia when the convoy was attacked by a submarine just west of the mouth of the Bojana river, which forms the border between Montenegro and Albania. All four torpedoes missed. During 1917, 97 escorted thirty-six convoys.

On 9 January 1918, 97 was damaged by heavy seas, and was repaired. On 24 May, 97, along with her sisters 77 and 78, and the Kaiman-class boats 58 and 59, pursued an unidentified British submarine near the island of Galijola in the mid-Adriatic. On 1 February 1918, a mutiny broke out among the sailors of some vessels of the Austro-Hungarian Navy at the Đenovići anchorage within the Bocche, largely over poor food, lack of replacement uniforms and supplies, and insufficient leave, although the poor state of the Austro-Hungarian economy and its impact on their families was also a factor. While 97 was in the Bocche at the time, she was undergoing boiler cleaning at the arsenal at Teodo and her crew did not join the revolt, which was suppressed the following day.

By 1918, the Allies had strengthened their ongoing blockade on the Strait of Otranto, as foreseen by the Austro-Hungarian Navy. As a result, it became more difficult for the German and Austro-Hungarian U-boats to get through the strait and into the Mediterranean Sea. In response, the new commander of the Austro-Hungarian Navy, Konteradmiral Miklós Horthy, decided to launch an attack on the Allied defenders with battleships, scout cruisers, and destroyers. During the night of 8 June, Horthy left Pola in the upper Adriatic with the dreadnought battleships Viribus Unitis and Prinz Eugen, with an escort that included 97. At about 23:00 on 9 June, after some difficulties getting the harbour defence barrage opened, the dreadnoughts Szent István and Tegetthoff, with an escort force, also departed Pola and set course for Slano, north of Ragusa. There they were to rendezvous with Horthy in preparation for a coordinated attack on the Otranto Barrage. About 03:15 on 10 June, (Note: Sources differ on the exact time the attack took place: Sieche states that Szent István was hit at 03:15, while Sokol says 03:30.) while returning from an uneventful patrol off the Dalmatian coast, two Royal Italian Navy (Italian: Regia Marina) MAS boats, MAS 15 and MAS 21, spotted the smoke from the Austrian ships. They successfully penetrated the escort screen and split to engage the dreadnoughts individually. MAS 21 attacked Tegetthoff, but her torpedoes missed, while MAS 15, under the command of Luigi Rizzo, fired two torpedoes at 03:25, both of which hit Szent István. They then evaded pursuit. The torpedo hits on Szent István were abreast her boiler rooms, which flooded, knocking out power to the pumps, and she capsized less than three hours later. This disaster essentially ended major Austro-Hungarian fleet operations in the Adriatic for the remainder of the war.

On 12–13 June, 97 covered the salvage of the Austro-Hungarian submarine SM U-10 which had been stranded. On 22 July, 97 escorted the minelayer Chamäleon. On 8 September, 97 was based at the Bocche again. On 14 October, 97 was part of a force which included her sisters 76, 88, and 100, providing anti-aircraft cover for the steamship Brünn as it attempted to free the stranded hospital ship Oceania which had been beached by her crew off Cape Rodoni in Albania after she had struck a mine. The attempt was unsuccessful, and Oceania was abandoned. During 1918, 97 conducted seven anti-submarine patrols and escorted forty-three convoys. As the end of the war approached in November the Austro-Hungarian Empire broke apart. On 1 November 1918, the Austro-Hungarian Emperor Charles ordered the handover of all naval vessels, establishments and fortresses, including 97, to the National Council of Slovenes, Croats and Serbs. This was the governing body of a short-lived fragment of the empire known as the State of Slovenes, Croats and Serbs that united with the Kingdoms of Serbia and Montenegro on 1 December to become the Kingdom of Serbs, Croats and Slovenes (from 1929, the Kingdom of Yugoslavia).

=== Interwar period ===
The Austro-Hungarian Empire sued for peace in November 1918, and 97 survived the war intact. The armistice between the Allies, the United States and Austria-Hungary was signed on 3 November, and came into force the following day. Its naval provisions included a requirement that Austria-Hungary hand over the bulk of its naval vessels to Allied and United States control and disarm the remainder. 97 was included in the handover. Italy immediately began to occupy the former Austro-Hungarian coast and offshore islands, and demanded the handover of the vessels then under the control of the National Council, which was soon enforced by the Allied Naval Council which also forced the remaining crews off most of the vessels. Immediately after the Austro-Hungarian capitulation, French troops occupied the Bocche, which was treated by the Allies as Austro-Hungarian territory. During the French occupation, the captured Austro-Hungarian Navy ships moored at the Bocche were neglected, and 97's original torpedo tubes were destroyed or damaged by French troops.

In 1920, under the terms of the previous year's Treaty of Saint-Germain-en-Laye, by which rump Austria officially ended World War I, 97 was allocated to the Kingdom of Serbs, Croats and Slovenes. Along with three other 250t-class F-group boats, 87, 93 and 96, and four 250t-class T-group boats, she served with the Royal Yugoslav Navy (Serbo-Croatian Latin: Kraljevska Mornarica, KM; Краљевска Морнарица). She was renamed T8 after the KM took her over in March 1921 following the French withdrawal. When the navy was formed, she and the other seven 250t-class boats were the KM's only modern sea-going vessels. New torpedo tubes of the same size were ordered for 97 from the Strojne Tovarne factory in Ljubljana.

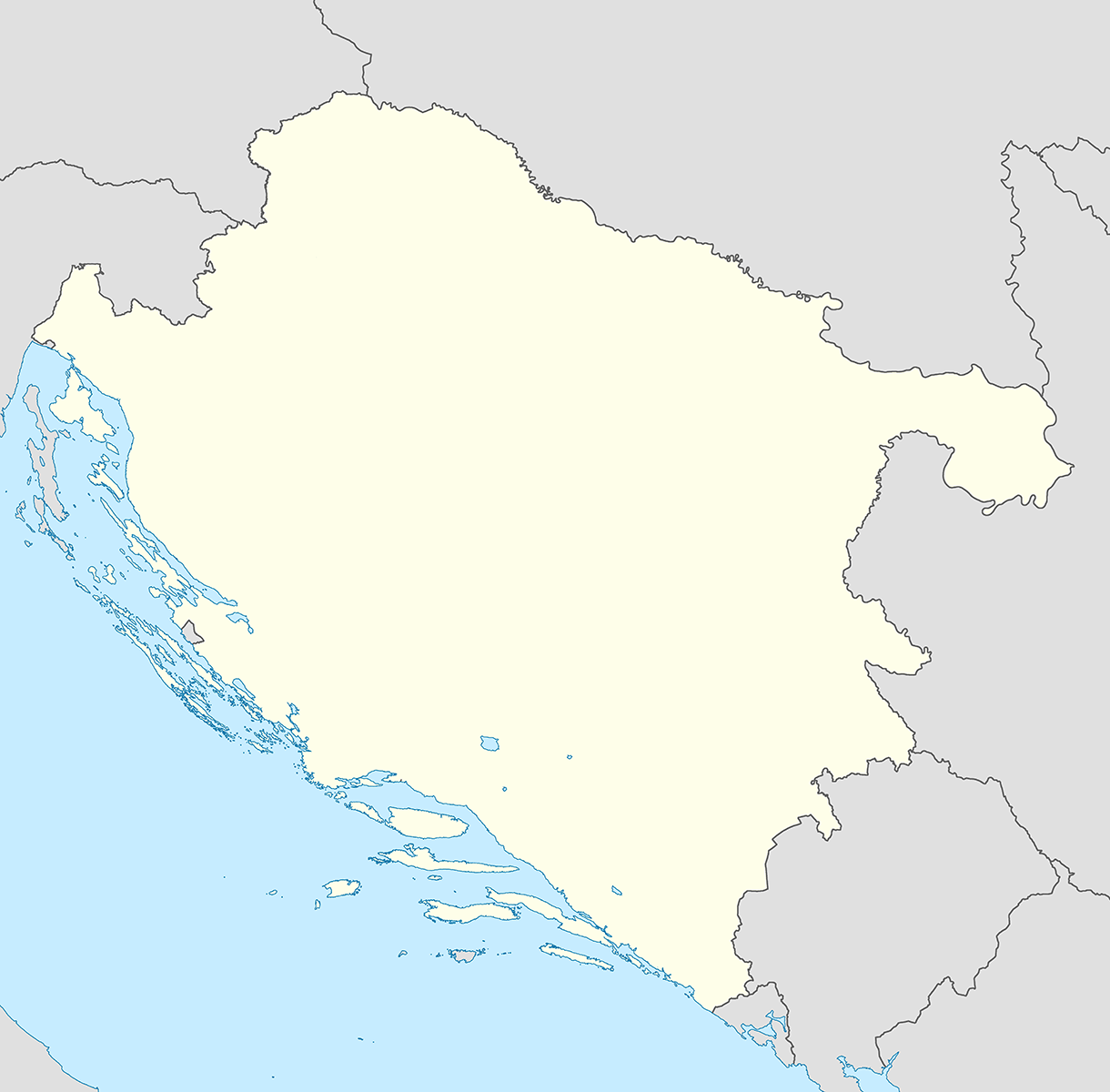
Map of the Independent State of Croatia showing key locations

The KM intended to replace one or both guns on each boat of the 250t class with a longer Škoda 66 mm L/45 gun, and according to Freivogel, this was done with the forward gun on T8. She was also fitted with one or two Zbrojovka 15 mm (0.59 in) machine guns and her crew increased to 52. In 1925, exercises were conducted off the Dalmatian coast, involving the majority of the navy. In May and June 1929, six of the eight 250t-class torpedo boats – including T8 – accompanied the light cruiser Dalmacija, the submarine tender Hvar and the submarines Hrabri and Nebojša, on a cruise to Malta, the Greek island of Corfu in the Ionian Sea, and Bizerte in the French protectorate of Tunisia. According to the British naval attaché to Yugoslavia, the ships and crews made a very good impression on the Royal Navy while visiting Malta. In 1932, the British naval attaché reported that Yugoslav ships engaged in few exercises, manoeuvres or gunnery training due to limited budgets. By 1939, the maximum speed achieved by the 250t class in Yugoslav service had declined to 24 kn (44 km/h; 28 mph).

=== World War II ===
In April 1941, Yugoslavia entered World War II when it was invaded by the German-led Axis powers. At the time, T8 was at the Bay of Kotor along with her sister ship T1 (formerly 76). They were formally part of the 3rd Torpedo Division, but stayed at Kotor when the rest of the division deployed to the central Dalmatian port of Šibenik just prior to the invasion with plans to attack the Italian enclave of Zara in northern Dalmatia, which were quickly cancelled. T8 was under repair, and was captured by the Italian Navy at the Bay of Kotor shortly after the Yugoslav capitulation and put into operation under her Yugoslav designation conducting coastal and second-line escort duties in the Adriatic, where she was less likely to engage Allied warships. Her dual-use 66 mm guns were replaced with two 76.2 mm (3 in) L/40 anti-aircraft guns, and her bridge was enclosed. She was allocated to Comando militare maritime della Dalmatia (Maridalmazia), the military maritime command of Dalmatia which was responsible for the area from the northern Adriatic island of Premuda south to the port of Bar in the Italian governorate of Montenegro.

The Italians capitulated in September 1943, by which time T8 was being utilised at Dubrovnik (formerly Ragusa) in southern Dalmatia as a guard ship. On 8 September, T8 returned from escorting a convoy to Durazzo in Albania. She received orders the following day to support Italian Army operations aimed at preventing the Germans from securing the Dalmatian coast, with a secondary role to escort ships carrying evacuating personnel. At 22:00, the commander of the Dubrovnik Naval District, Capitano di vascello (Note: Capitano di vascello in the Italian navy was equivalent to a contemporary British Royal Navy captain.) Alfredo Bernardinelli, came aboard T8 and the boat set out to provide cover for vessels fleeing from the islands of Korčula and Mljet and the ports of Ploče and Gruž. They intended to return to Dubrovnik afterwards, but its port was occupied by the Germans and they faced capture if they returned. Bernardinelli and the boat's captain decided to evade the Germans by sailing to Italy via the island of Lastovo, where they planned to replenish boiler water. Around 16:00 on 11 September, while T8 was passing between the islets of Olipa and Jakljan in the Elaphiti Islands off southern Dalmatia, she was attacked by nine German Junkers Ju 87 "Stuka" divebombers and sank in a few minutes. About half of her crew died, along with Bernardinelli and her captain, and many were wounded. Survivors were rescued by local Partisans who brought them to Lastovo from where they were evacuated to Bari in Allied-held Italy on 23 September on the hospital ship Lubiana.

== See also ==
- List of ships of the Royal Yugoslav Navy
