= Yugoslav torpedo boat T6 =

Royal Yugoslav Navy sea-going torpedo boat

T6
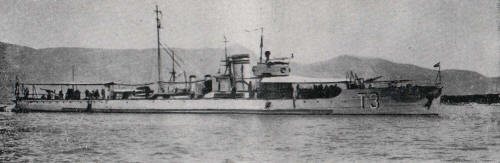
- T6's sister ship, T3; the only significant external difference was that T6 had two funnels.

History

Austria-Hungary
- Name: 93 F then 93
- Builder: Ganz & Danubius
- Laid down: 9 January 1915
- Launched: 25 November 1915
- Commissioned: 4 April 1916
- Out of service: November 1918
- Fate: Assigned to the Kingdom of Serbs, Croats and Slovenes

Kingdom of Yugoslavia
- Name: T6
- Acquired: March 1921
- Out of service: April 1941
- Fate: Captured by Italy

Italy
- Name: T6
- Acquired: April 1941
- Out of service: September 1943
- Fate: Scuttled by crew 11 September 1943

General characteristics
- Class & type: 250t-class, F-group sea-going torpedo boat
- Displacement: 243.9 t (240 long tons); 267 t (263 long tons) (full load)
- Length: 58.76 m (192 ft 9 in)
- Beam: 5.84 m (19 ft 2 in)
- Draught: 1.5 m (4 ft 11 in)
- Installed power: 5,000–6,000 shp (3,700–4,500 kW); 2 × Yarrow water-tube boilers
- Propulsion: 2 × shafts; 2 × AEG-Curtis steam turbines
- Speed: 28–29 kn (52–54 km/h; 32–33 mph)
- Range: 1,200 nmi (2,200 km; 1,400 mi) at 16 kn (30 km/h; 18 mph)
- Complement: 41
- Armament: 2 × Škoda 66 mm (2.6 in) L/30 guns; 4 × 450 mm (17.7 in) torpedo tubes; 1 × 8 mm (0.31 in) machine gun; 10–12 naval mines

T6 was a sea-going torpedo boat that was operated by the Royal Yugoslav Navy between 1921 and 1941. Originally 93 F, a 250t-class torpedo boat of the Austro-Hungarian Navy built in 1915–1916, she was armed with two Škoda 66 mm (2.6 in) guns and four 450 mm (17.7 in) torpedo tubes and could carry 10–12 naval mines. She saw active service during World War I, performing convoy, escort, patrol and minesweeping tasks, as well as anti-submarine operations. In 1917 the suffixes of all Austro-Hungarian torpedo boats were removed, and thereafter she was referred to as 93.

Following Austria-Hungary's defeat in 1918, 93 was allocated to the Navy of the Kingdom of Serbs, Croats and Slovenes, which later became the Royal Yugoslav Navy, and was renamed T6. At the time, she and the seven other 250t-class boats were the only modern sea-going vessels of the fledgling maritime force. During the interwar period, T6 and the rest of the navy were involved in training exercises and cruises to friendly ports, but activity was limited by reduced naval budgets. The boat was captured by the Italians during the German-led Axis invasion of Yugoslavia in April 1941. After her main armament was modernised, she served with the Royal Italian Navy under her Yugoslav designation, conducting coastal and second-line escort duties in the Adriatic Sea. Immediately following the Italian capitulation in September 1943, she was scuttled by her crew as she had insufficient fuel on board to reach an Allied port.

== Background ==
In 1910, the Austria-Hungary Naval Technical Committee initiated the design and development of a 275-tonne (271-long-ton) coastal torpedo boat, specifying that it should be capable of sustaining 30 knots (56 km/h; 35 mph) for 10 hours. At the same time, the committee issued design parameters for a high seas or fleet torpedo boat of 500–550 t (490–540 long tons), top speed of 30 kn and endurance of 480 nautical miles (890 km; 550 mi). This design would have been a larger and better-armed vessel than the existing Austro-Hungarian 400-tonne (390-long-ton) Huszár-class destroyers. The specification for the high seas torpedo boat was based on an expectation that the Strait of Otranto, where the Adriatic Sea meets the Ionian Sea, would be blockaded by hostile forces during a future conflict. In such circumstances, there would be a need for a torpedo boat that could sail from the Austro-Hungarian naval (Note: German: kaiserliche und königliche Kriegsmarine; Hungarian: Császári és Királyi Haditengerészet) base at the Bocche di Cattaro (the Bocche or Bay of Kotor) to the strait during the night, locate and attack blockading ships and return to port before morning. Steam turbine power was selected for propulsion, as diesels with the necessary power were not available and the Austro-Hungarian Navy did not have the practical experience to run turbo-electric boats.

Despite having developed these ideas, the Austro-Hungarian Navy then asked shipyards to submit proposals for a 250 t (250-long-ton) boat with a maximum speed of 28 kn (52 km/h; 32 mph). Stabilimento Tecnico Triestino (STT) of Triest was selected for the contract to build the first eight vessels, designated as the T-group. Another tender was requested for four more boats, but when Ganz & Danubius reduced their price by ten per cent, a total of sixteen boats were ordered from them, designated the F-group. The F-group designation signified the location of Ganz & Danubius' main shipyard at Fiume.

== Description and construction ==
The 250t-class F-group boats had short raised forecastles and an open bridge and were fast and agile, well designed for service in the Adriatic. They had a waterline length of 58.76 metres (192 ft 9 in), a beam of 5.84 m (19 ft 2 in), and a normal draught of 1.5 m (4 ft 11 in). While their designed displacement was 243.9 t (240 long tons), they displaced 267 tonnes (263 long tons) fully loaded. The boats were powered by two AEG-Curtis steam turbines driving two propellers, using steam generated by two Yarrow water-tube boilers, one of which burned fuel oil and the other coal. There were two boiler rooms, one behind the other. The turbines were rated at 5,000 shaft horsepower (3,700 kW) with a maximum output of 6,000 shp (4,500 kW) and were designed to propel the boats to a top speed of 28–29 kn (52–54 km/h; 32–33 mph). They carried 20.2 tonnes (19.9 long tons) of coal and 31 tonnes (30.5 long tons) of fuel oil, which gave them a range of 1,200 nautical miles (2,200 km; 1,400 mi) at 16 kn (30 km/h; 18 mph). The F-group had two funnels rather than the single funnel of the T-group. The crew consisted of three officers and thirty-eight enlisted men. The vessel carried one 4 m (13 ft) yawl as a ship's boat.

93 F and the rest of the 250t class were classified as high seas torpedo boats by the Austro-Hungarian Navy, despite being smaller than the original concept for a coastal torpedo boat. The naval historian Zvonimir Freivogel states that this type of situation was common due to the parsimony of the Austro-Hungarian Navy. The 250t class were the first small Austro-Hungarian Navy boats to use turbines, and this contributed to ongoing problems with them, which had to be progressively solved once they were in service.

The boats were armed with two Škoda 66 mm (2.6 in) L/30 (Note: L/30 denotes the length of the gun's barrel. In this case, the L/30 gun is 30 calibre, meaning that the barrel was 30 times as long as the diameter of its bore.) guns, with the forward gun mounted on the forecastle and the aft gun on the quarterdeck. A 40 cm (16 in) searchlight was mounted above the bridge. They were also armed with four 450 mm (17.7 in) torpedo tubes mounted in pairs, with one pair mounted between the forecastle and bridge and the other aft of the mainmast. One 8 mm (0.31 in) Schwarzlose M.7/12 machine gun was carried for anti-aircraft work. Four mounting points were installed so that the machine gun could be mounted in the most effective position depending on the expected direction of attack. The boat could also carry 10–12 naval mines.

The fifth of the F-group to be completed at Ganz-Danubius' main shipyard at Fiume, 93 F was laid down on 9 January 1915, launched on 25 November and commissioned on 4 April 1916.

== Career ==
=== World War I ===
The original concept of operation for the 250t-class boats was that they would sail in a flotilla at the rear of a cruising battle formation and were to intervene in fighting only if the battleships around which the formation was established were disabled, or to attack damaged enemy battleships. When a torpedo attack was ordered, it was to be led by a scout cruiser, supported by two destroyers to repel any enemy torpedo boats. A group of four to six torpedo boats would deliver the attack under the direction of the flotilla commander. On 3 May 1916, 93 F and five other 250-class torpedo boats were accompanying four destroyers when they were involved in a surface action off Porto Corsini against an Italian force led by the flotilla leaders Cesare Rossarol and Guglielmo Pepe. On this occasion the Austro-Hungarian force retreated behind a minefield without damage. On 12 June, 93 F and her M-group sisters 98 M and 99 M were tasked to search for the Nembo-class destroyer Zeffiro and two small torpedo boats after they had attacked the town of Parenzo on the west Istrian coast, but the Italian ships escaped unharmed, apart from Zeffiro which was damaged in an attack by seaplanes. On 12 and 13 July, 93 F conducted trials with new smoke generators. On 29 October, she underwent repairs at the main Austro-Hungarian naval base at Pola in the northern Adriatic.

In 1917, one of 93 F's 66 mm guns may have been placed on an anti-aircraft mount. According to Freivogel, sources vary on whether these mounts were added to all boats of the class, and on whether these mounts were added to the forward or aft gun. In March, the noted inventor Dagobert Müller von Thomamühl was in command of the boat with the rank of Linienschiffsleutnant. (Note: Linienschiffsleutnant in the Austro-Hungarian Navy was roughly equivalent to a contemporary lieutenant or lieutenant commander in the British Royal Navy depending on years of experience.) At this time, 93 F was allocated to the 7th Torpedo Boat Group of the 5th Torpedo Division. On 11 May 1917, the British submarine HMS H1 stalked 78 T off Pola, missing her with two torpedoes. In response, 93 F, 96 F and 78 T, accompanied by the Huszár-class destroyer Csikós, unsuccessfully pursued H1. On 21 May, the suffix of all Austro-Hungarian torpedo boats was removed, and thereafter they were referred to only by the numeral. Also in May, 93 conducted several minesweeping missions. On 3–4 June, 93, along with 96 as well as Csikós and her sister ships Wildfang and Velebit, were returning from a seaplane support mission when Wildfang struck a mine and sank, with 93 assisting with the rescue of her surviving crew. On 11 July, 93 was transferred south from Pola to the Bocche. On 23 September, she was patrolling near the mouth of the Bojana River that marks the border between Montenegro and Albania, when an unidentified Allied submarine fired a torpedo at her, but it passed under her hull without exploding. During 1917, 93 conducted further minesweeping missions and escorted 36 convoys.

On 1 February 1918, a mutiny broke out among the sailors of some vessels of the Austro-Hungarian Navy at the Đenovići anchorage within the Bocche, largely over poor food, lack of replacement uniforms and supplies, and insufficient leave, although the poor state of the Austro-Hungarian economy and its impact on their families was also a factor. In response, the three Erzherzog Karl-class pre-dreadnought battleships of the 3rd Division were despatched from Pola to the Bocche the following day to put down the rebellion, and 93 was part of their escort. In the event, the mutiny had been suppressed before they arrived, and 93 returned to Pola with the battleships soon after. On 22 April, 93 was part of an escort for the dreadnoughts Viribus Unitis and Szent István when they sailed to the Fasana Channel – between the Brijuni Islands and the Istrian Peninsula – for gunnery practice. 93 escorted the minelayer Camäleon while she laid a minefield on 22 July. On 11 August, 93, along with her sisters 78 and 80, the destroyer Warasdiner and the submarine chasers Arsa and Slavija, were despatched to chase the Italian submarine F7 which had sunk the steamship Euterpe off the island of Pag but had to terminate the pursuit due to poor weather. Two days later she joined the vessels of the anti-submarine flotilla in a hunt, but despite claims of success, no enemy submarine was sunk. On 20 August, 93 was transferred to the Bocche and was part of the 1st Torpedo Flotilla. On 29 September, 93 along with 82, 87 and 96 plus the Ersatz Triglav-class destroyers Lika, Dukla and Uzsok, laid mines in the Bay of Drim off northern Albania. During 1918, 93 also performed 55 more convoy escorts. As the end of the war approached in November the Austro-Hungarian Empire broke apart. On 1 November 1918, 93 was ceded to the State of Slovenes, Croats and Serbs. This was a short-lived fragment of the empire which united with the Kingdom of Serbia and Kingdom of Montenegro on 1 December, becoming the Kingdom of Serbs, Croats and Slovenes (from 1929, the Kingdom of Yugoslavia).

=== Interwar period ===
The Austro-Hungarian Empire sued for peace in November 1918, and 93 survived the war intact. Immediately after the Austro-Hungarian capitulation, French troops occupied the Bocche, which was treated by the Allies as Austro-Hungarian territory. During the French occupation, the captured Austro-Hungarian Navy ships moored at the Bocche were neglected, and 93's original torpedo tubes were destroyed or damaged by French troops. In 1920, under the terms of the previous year's Treaty of Saint-Germain-en-Laye by which rump Austria officially ended World War I, 93 was allocated to the Kingdom of Serbs, Croats and Slovenes. Along with 87, 96 and 97, and four 250t-class T-group boats, she served with the Royal Yugoslav Navy (Serbo-Croatian Latin: Kraljevska Mornarica, KM; Краљевска Морнарица). Transferred in March 1921, in KM service, 93 was renamed T6. When the navy was formed, she and the other seven 250t-class boats were its only modern sea-going vessels. New torpedo tubes of the same size as originally fitted were ordered from the Strojne Tovarne factory in Ljubljana. In KM service T6 was rearmed with a single Bofors 40 mm (1.6 in) L/60 gun, and was also fitted with two Zbrojovka 15 mm (0.59 in) machine guns. Her crew was increased to 52, and she was commissioned in 1923.

In 1925, exercises were conducted off the Dalmatian coast, involving the majority of the navy. In May and June 1929, six of the eight 250t-class torpedo boats – including T6 – accompanied the more recently acquired light cruiser Dalmacija, submarine tender Hvar and submarines Hrabri and Nebojša, on a cruise to Malta, the Greek island of Corfu in the Ionian Sea, and Bizerte in the French protectorate of Tunisia. The ships and crews made a very good impression while visiting Malta. In 1932, the British naval attaché reported that Yugoslav ships engaged in few exercises, manoeuvres or gunnery training due to reduced budgets. By 1939, the maximum speed achieved by the 250t class in Yugoslav service had declined to 24 kn (44 km/h; 28 mph).

=== World War II ===
In April 1941, Yugoslavia entered World War II when it was invaded by the German-led Axis powers. At the time of the invasion, T6 was assigned to the 3rd Torpedo Division located at Šibenik, which also included her sisters T3, T5 and T7. On the first day of the invasion, 6 April, they were anchored across the entrance of the St. Anthony Channel that links Šibenik Bay to the Adriatic, on a line between Jadrija on the northern side of the channel and Zablaće on the southern side, when aircraft of the Regia Aeronautica (Italian Royal Air Force) attacked Šibenik. On the same day, Kapetan bojnog broda (Note: Kapetan bojnog broda in the KM was equivalent to a contemporary captain in the British Royal Navy.) Ivan Kern arrived to take command of the division, and the four boats sailed up the channel towards Šibenik then north to Zaton where they were again attacked unsuccessfully by Italian bombers. T3 incurred boiler damage and was sent south to Primošten for repairs to be undertaken.

On 8 April more unsuccessful Italian air attacks on the three remaining boats occurred, and the only effective anti-aircraft gun between them – the 40 mm gun on T6 – malfunctioned. The three vessels then sailed east across Lake Prokljan to Skradin, where the population begged them to leave the harbour to avoid the town being bombed by the Italians. Their request was rebuffed, and during an Italian bombing raid some of the boats along with the water carrier Perun were slightly damaged. The following morning, Italian aircraft attempted to sink Perun using aerial torpedoes, but all missed. In response, Kern ordered T6 to escort Perun to the Bay of Kotor; the two vessels arrived there the next day without incident. There, T6's malfunctioning gun was repaired, and she was loaded with weapons, supplies and extra men and sent to Šibenik. On the return journey she stopped at Makarska and learned of the declaration of the creation of the Independent State of Croatia (NDH), an Axis puppet fascist state. On the same day, the division, along with other vessels, were tasked to support an attack on the Italian enclave of Zara on the Dalmatian coast, which was quickly cancelled as soon as the establishment of the NDH was declared. On the evening of 11 April, T6 met with T5 and the rest of the division near Šibenik. Kern ordered her to deliver her load to Šibenik then meet the rest of the division at Milna on the island of Brač. While overnighting at Šibenik, T6's crew saw the crew of the Uskok-class torpedo boat Četnik desert their boat during the night. T6 sailed to Milna on 12 April. Kern was unable to obtain orders from Šibenik Command by telephone, so he took the other Uskok-class boat Uskok to try to obtain some. His second-in-command was unable to maintain order, and a third of the crews of the division deserted. When Kern returned, he gave orders to sail to the Bay of Kotor, but the crews of the division refused to follow his orders. Kern retrieved his personal gear from T7 and, taking command of Uskok, sailed to the Bay of Kotor. Eventually he fled into exile with other KM vessels. On 13 April, the Orjen-class torpedo boat Triglav arrived with orders that the division should return to Šibenik to evacuate the staff of the KM Šibenik Command. The first order was complied with, but upon arrival at Šibenik the boat crews were given the choice of returning to their homes or sailing to Split to join the NDH navy. T6's commander, a Slovene, was not interested in serving in a Croatian navy and abandoned his vessel. The boats then sailed to nearby Divulje, to follow through on an intention to join the NDH navy, but the Italians opposed the NDH having a navy and they captured the boats of the division including T6.

T6 was then operated by the Italians under her Yugoslav designation, conducting coastal and second-line escort duties in the Adriatic. Second line escort duties were those where she was less likely to be required to engage Allied warships. Her main guns were replaced by two 76.2 mm (3 in) L/30 anti-aircraft guns, she was fitted with one or two Breda 20 mm (0.79 in) L/65 anti-aircraft guns, her bridge was enclosed, and one pair of torpedo tubes may have also been removed. She was also painted in a dazzle camouflage pattern. In Italian hands, her crew was increased to 64. She was allocated to Maridalmazia, the military maritime command of Dalmatia (Comando militare marittimo della Dalmazia), which was responsible for the area from the northern Adriatic island of Premuda south to the port of Bar in the Italian governorate of Montenegro. According to Italian records, in February 1942, T6 and her sister T5 chased an Allied submarine between Split and the island of Mulo near Primošten, but there is no record of this incident in British records. During a convoy escort in the same month, an explosion occurred in one of T6's boilers, killing one stoker and injuring four. Based at Šibenik at the time of the Italian capitulation in September 1943, T6 was underway to the island of Lošinj south of Rijeka (formerly Fiume). Her commander suspected that Lošinj had already been occupied by the Germans, so he set course for Cesenatico – 30 km (19 mi) north of Rimini on the Italian coast – with the intention of continuing to Ancona to avoid the boat falling into German hands. He was unable to make contact with the Italian naval command at Ancona, and when no fuel was available at Cesenatico, he scuttled T6 off the town on 11 September as she had insufficient fuel remaining on board to reach an Allied port. Her crew became German prisoners of war.

== See also ==
- List of ships of the Royal Yugoslav Navy
