= Yugoslav torpedo boat T4 =

T4
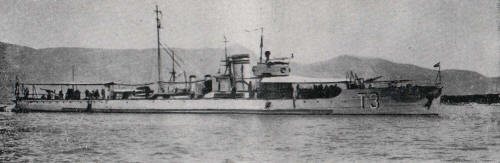
- One of T4's sister ships, T3

History

Austria-Hungary
- Name: 79 T then 79
- Builder: Stabilimento Tecnico Triestino
- Laid down: 1 December 1913
- Launched: 30 April 1914
- Commissioned: 1 October 1914
- Out of service: 1 November 1918
- Fate: Assigned to the Kingdom of Serbs, Croats and Slovenes

Kingdom of Yugoslavia
- Name: T4
- Acquired: March 1921
- Commissioned: 1923
- Out of service: 1932
- Fate: Stranded then scrapped

General characteristics
- Class & type: 250t-class, T-group sea-going torpedo boat
- Displacement: 262 t (258 long tons); 267.3 t (263 long tons) (full load)
- Length: 57.84 m (189 ft 9 in)
- Beam: 5.75 m (18 ft 10 in)
- Draught: 1.54 m (5 ft 1 in)
- Installed power: 5,000–5,700 shp (3,700–4,300 kW); 2 × Yarrow water-tube boilers
- Propulsion: 2 × shafts; 2 × Parsons steam turbines
- Speed: 28 knots (52 km/h; 32 mph)
- Range: 1,000 nmi (1,900 km; 1,200 mi) at 16 knots (30 km/h; 18 mph)
- Complement: 41 officers and enlisted
- Armament: 2 × Škoda 66 mm (2.6 in) L/30 guns; 4 × 450 mm (17.7 in) torpedo tubes; 1 × 8 mm (0.31 in) machine gun; 10–12 naval mines

T4 was a seagoing torpedo boat operated by the Royal Yugoslav Navy between 1921 and 1932. Originally 79 T, a 250t-class torpedo boat of the Austro-Hungarian Navy built in 1914, she was armed with two 66 mm (2.6 in) guns and four 450 mm (17.7 in) torpedo tubes, and could carry 10–12 naval mines. She saw active service during World War I, performing convoy, patrol, escort and minesweeping tasks, anti-submarine operations and shore bombardment missions. In 1917, the suffixes of all Austro-Hungarian torpedo boats were removed, and thereafter she was referred to as 79. Underway during the short-lived mutiny by Austro-Hungarian sailors in early February 1918, her captain realised the danger and put her crew ashore. She was part of the escort force for the Austro-Hungarian dreadnought Szent István during the action that resulted in the sinking of that ship by Italian torpedo boats in June 1918.

Following Austria-Hungary's defeat in 1918, 79 was allocated to the Navy of the Kingdom of Serbs, Croats and Slovenes, which later became the Royal Yugoslav Navy, and was renamed T4. At the time, she and the seven other 250t-class boats were the only modern sea-going vessels of the fledgling maritime force. During the interwar period, T4 and the rest of the navy were involved in training exercises and cruises to friendly ports, but activity was limited by reduced naval budgets. In 1932, she ran aground on the island of Drvenik Mali off the central Dalmatian coast and the hull broke in half. The bow remained on the island, and the stern was towed to the Tivat Arsenal in the Bay of Kotor. As a result, it became a standing joke among Yugoslav sailors that this made T4 the "world's longest torpedo boat". Eventually, both sections were scrapped where they were.

== Background ==
In 1910, the Austria-Hungary Naval Technical Committee initiated the design and development of a 275-tonne (271-long-ton) coastal torpedo boat, specifying that it should be capable of sustaining 30 knots (56 km/h; 35 mph) for 10 hours. At the same time, the committee issued design parameters for a high seas or fleet torpedo boat of 500–550 t (490–540 long tons), top speed of 30 kn and endurance of 480 nautical miles (890 km; 550 mi). This design would have been a larger and better-armed vessel than the existing Austro-Hungarian 400-tonne (390-long-ton) Huszár-class destroyers. The specification for the high seas torpedo boat was based on an expectation that the Strait of Otranto, where the Adriatic Sea meets the Ionian Sea, would be blockaded by hostile forces during a future conflict. In such circumstances, there would be a need for a torpedo boat that could sail from the Austro-Hungarian Navy (German: kaiserliche und königliche Kriegsmarine, Hungarian: Császári és Királyi Haditengerészet) base at the Bocche di Cattaro (the Bocche or Bay of Kotor) to the strait during the night, locate and attack blockading ships and return to port before morning. Steam turbine power was selected for propulsion, as diesels with the necessary power were not available, and the Austro-Hungarian Navy did not have the practical experience to run turbo-electric boats. Despite having developed these ideas, the Austro-Hungarian Navy then asked shipyards to submit proposals for a 250 t (250-long-ton) boat with a maximum speed of 28 kn (52 km/h; 32 mph). Stabilimento Tecnico Triestino (STT) of Triest was selected for the contract to build eight vessels, the T group, ahead of one other tenderer. The T-group designation signified that they were built at Triest.

== Description and construction ==
The 250t-class, T-group boats had short raised forecastles and an open bridge, and were fast and agile, well designed for service in the Adriatic. They had a waterline length of 57.84 m (189 ft 9 in), a beam of 5.75 m (18 ft 10 in), and a normal draught of 1.54 m (5 ft 1 in). Their designed displacement was 262 tonnes (258 long tons), but they displaced about 267.3 tonnes (263 long tons) fully loaded. The boats were powered by two Parsons steam turbines driving two propellers, using steam generated by two Yarrow water-tube boilers, one of which burned fuel oil and the other coal. There were two boiler rooms, one behind the other. The turbines were rated at 5,000–5,700 shaft horsepower (3,700–4,300 kW) and designed to propel the boats to a top speed of 28 kn (52 km/h; 32 mph), although a maximum speed of 29.2 kn (54.1 km/h; 33.6 mph) could be achieved. They carried 18.2 t (17.9 long tons) of coal and 24.3 t (23.9 long tons) of fuel oil, which gave them a range of 1,000 nautical miles (1,900 km; 1,200 mi) at 16 kn (30 km/h; 18 mph). The T group had one funnel rather than the two funnels of the later groups of the class. The Austro-Hungarian Navy classified 79 T and the rest of the 250t class as high seas torpedo boats despite being smaller than the original concept for a coastal torpedo boat. The naval historian Zvonimir Freivogel states that this type of situation was common due to the parsimony of the Austro-Hungarian Navy. They were the first small Austro-Hungarian Navy boats to use turbines, and this contributed to ongoing problems with them, which had to be progressively solved once they were in service. The crew consisted of three officers and thirty-eight enlisted men. The vessel carried one 4 m (13 ft) yawl as a ship's boat.

The boats were originally to be armed with three Škoda 66 mm (2.6 in) L/30 (Note: L/30 denotes the length of the gun's barrel. In this case, the L/30 gun is 30 calibre, meaning that the barrel was 30 times as long as the diameter of its bore.) guns, and three 450 mm (17.7 in) torpedo tubes, but this was changed to two guns and four torpedo tubes before the first boat was completed, to standardise the armament with the F group to follow. A 40 cm (16 in) searchlight was mounted above the bridge. The torpedo tubes were mounted in pairs, one between the forecastle and bridge, and the other on a section of raised superstructure above the aft machinery room. They could also carry 10–12 naval mines.

The sixth of its class to be completed, 79 T was laid down on 1 December 1913, launched on 30 April 1914, completed on 30 September 1914, and commissioned the following day, two months after World War I began. Before her commissioning, one 8 mm (0.31 in) Schwarzlose M.7/12 machine gun was included in the armament of all boats of the class for anti-aircraft work. Four mounting points were installed so that the machine gun could be fitted in the most effective position depending on the expected direction of attack. Until October 1915, the boat was painted black, but from that point it was painted a light blue-grey.

== Career ==
=== World War I ===
The original concept of operation for the 250t-class boats was that they would sail in a flotilla at the rear of a cruising battle formation, and were to intervene in fighting only if the battleships around which the formation was established were disabled, or to attack damaged enemy battleships. When a torpedo attack was ordered, it was to be led by a scout cruiser, supported by two destroyers to repel any enemy torpedo boats. A group of four to six torpedo boats would deliver the attack under the direction of the flotilla commander. As the 250t-class boats came into service, they joined the 1st Torpedo Flotilla, which was initially led by the Novara-class scout cruiser Saida and later by her sister Helgoland. The 1st Torpedo Flotilla initially included two divisions of destroyers (1st and 2nd) and a division of torpedo boats (3rd), which the 250t-class boats joined. Throughout the war, 79 T remained with the 3rd Torpedo Division of the 1st Torpedo Flotilla.

Not long after being commissioned, on 17 October 1914 79 T joined the rest of the 1st Torpedo Flotilla in an attempt to engage part of the French fleet operating in the southern Adriatic. The French were sailing in the vicinity of the island of Vis, but departed south during the night of 17/18 October, and the Austro-Hungarian flotilla was unable to launch an attack. Also in October, 79 T undertook a patrol between the islands of Busi and Pelagosa, and on 9 November the boat patrolled near the island of Lagosta. On 15 and 16 March 1915, 79 T, along with the old torpedo gunboat Magnet and 250t-class boats 75 T and 76 T, escorted the newly commissioned dreadnought battleship Szent István from the main Austro-Hungarian naval base at Pola – in the upper Adriatic – to the island of Pago to conduct firing exercises. Led by Helgoland, the whole 1st Torpedo Flotilla steamed to the Ionian Sea over the period 11–15 April 1915 in search of the French fleet base, but the operation was unsuccessful.

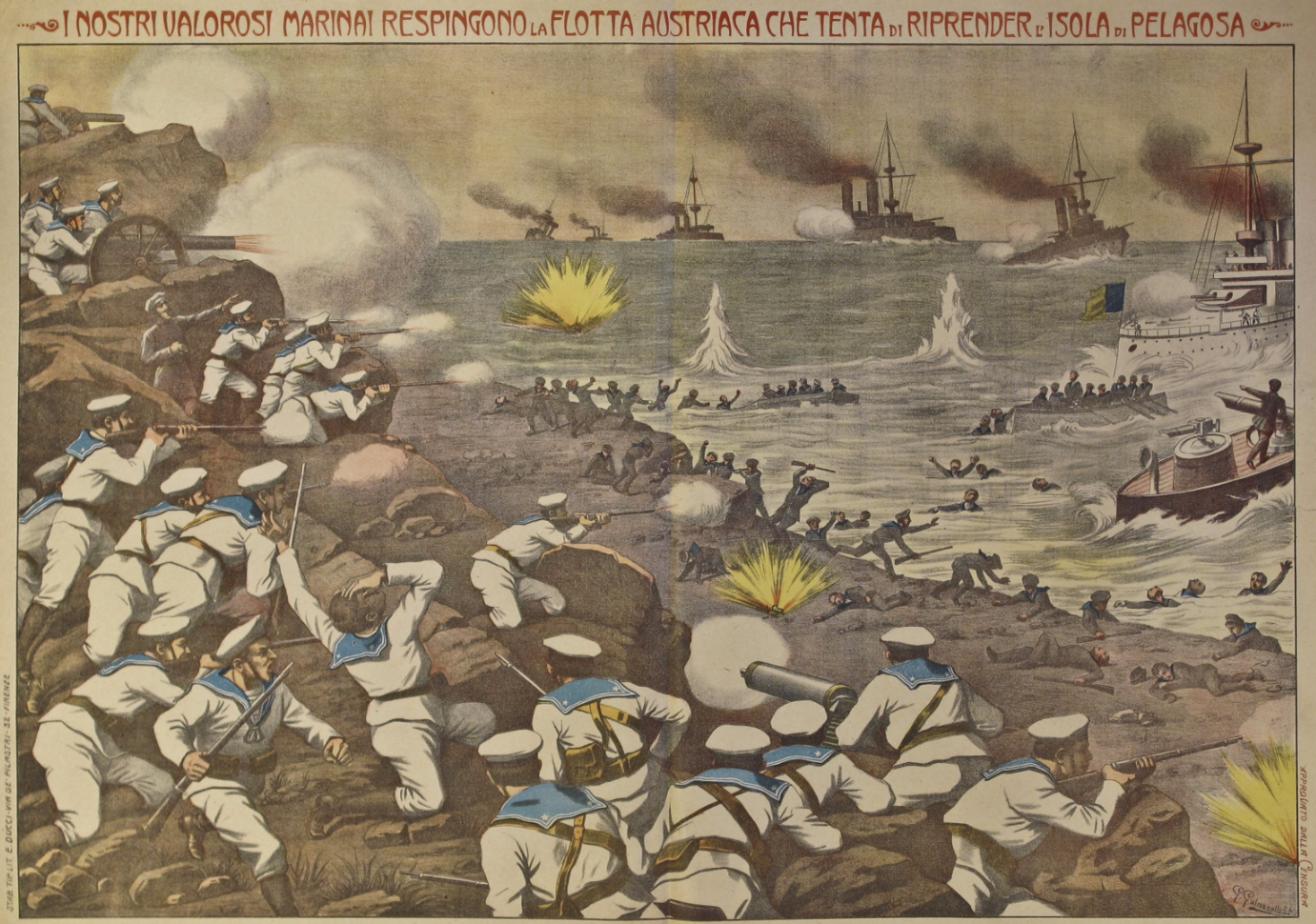
The island of Pelagosa was defended by Italian sailors in 1915.

Italy declared war on Austria-Hungary on 23 May 1915, and hostilities in the Adriatic, which had thus far mostly involved intermittent forays by the French fleet, immediately intensified. Almost the entire Austro-Hungarian fleet left Pola soon after the declaration to deliver an immediate response against Italian cities and towns along the Adriatic coast, aiming to interdict land and sea transport between southern Italy and the northern regions of that country which were expected to be a theatre of land operations. The fleet split into six groups with a range of targets up and down the coast. On 24 May, 79 T participated in this operation, known as the Bombardment of Ancona, which involved shelling of Italian shore-based targets; 79 T targeted Porto Corsini near Ravenna, along with the scout cruiser Novara, Huszár-class destroyer Scharfschutze, and 78 T, 80 T and 81 T. During that action, an Italian 120 mm (4.7 in) shore battery returned fire, hitting Novara and damaging 80 T, wounding three of her crew. Following this, 79 T was involved in several more attacks on Italian coastal targets, including one targeting Rimini on 18 June led by the armoured cruiser Sankt Georg and the protected cruiser Szigetvár and supported by 75 T, 76 T and four Kaiman-class torpedo boats.

On 27 July, a group led by Novara and the scout cruiser Admiral Spaun, and escorted by the Huszár-class destroyers Scharfschutze and Uskoke along with 79 T, 75 T and 76 T shelled the railway line between Ancona and Pesaro during a seaplane raid on Ancona. After the Italian airship Città di Jesi was downed on 5 August, 79 T towed her to Pola. On 17 August, the 1st Torpedo Flotilla shelled the island chain of Pelagosa in the middle of the Adriatic, and 79 T was part of a force tasked to protect the southern approaches to the islands from enemy submarines. The success of this bombardment, which destroyed the only source of drinking water, caused the Italians to abandon Pelagosa. On 9 September 1915, 79 T, 75 T and 76 T comprised the 3rd Torpedo Boat Group of the 3rd Torpedo Division. On 9 November, 79 T was sweeping for mines off Parenzo on the western coast of the Istrian peninsula when she was attacked unsuccessfully with a torpedo by an enemy submarine.

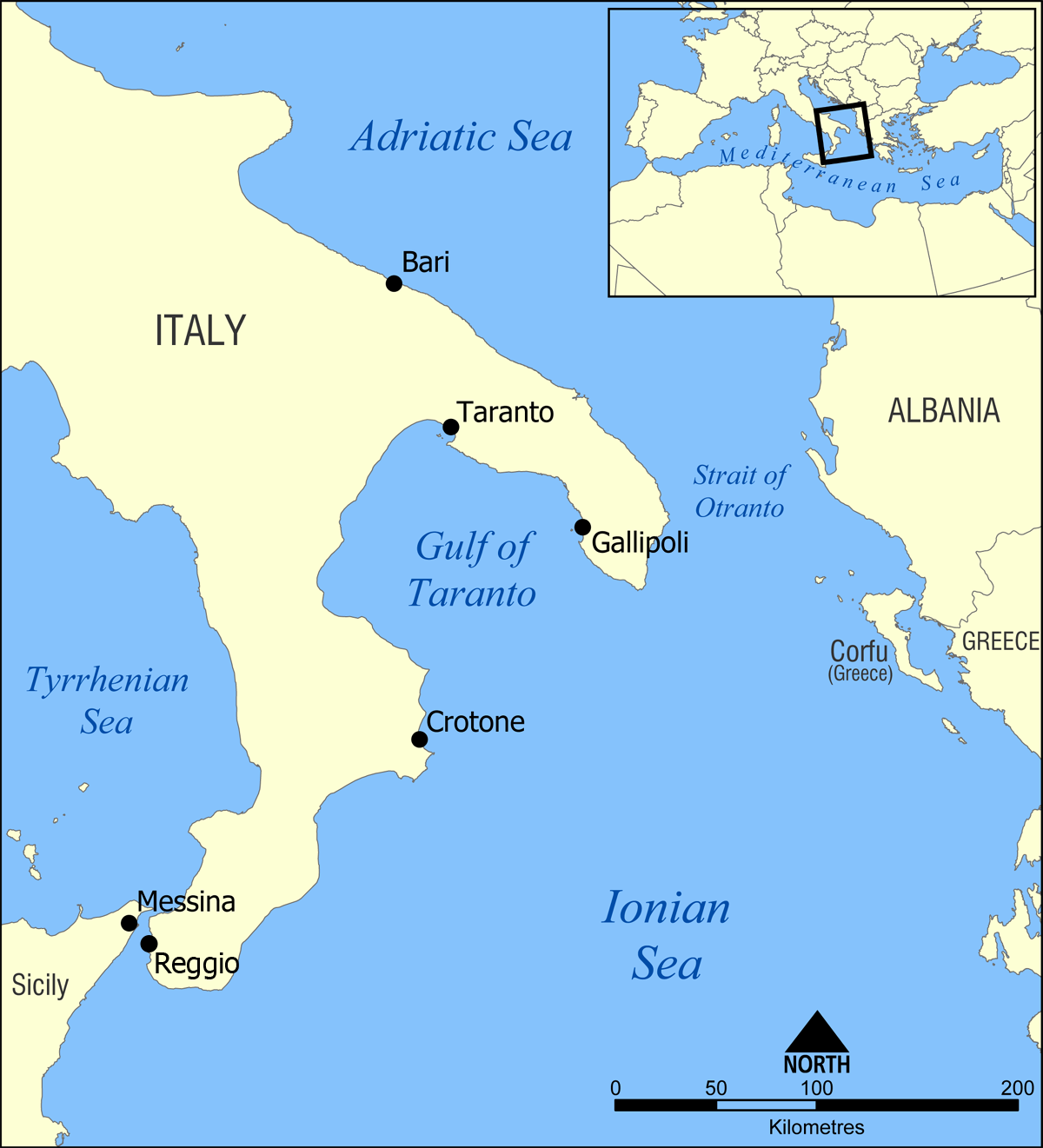
The Strait of Otranto was blockaded by the Allied navies from 1915 until the end of the war to stop the Austro-Hungarian Navy from leaving the Adriatic Sea.

In late November 1915, the Austro-Hungarian fleet deployed a force from Pola to Cattaro in the southern Adriatic; this force included six of the eight T-group torpedo boats. This force was tasked to maintain a permanent patrol of the Albanian coastline and interdict any troop transports crossing from Italy. On 9 December, 79 T, three destroyers, two Kaiman-class torpedo boats and two other 250t-class boats formed a group led by Szigetvár which escorted seaplanes during a raid on Ancona. On 4 January 1916, 79 T laid mines in the Bay of Triest. A raid on the Otranto Barrage – an Allied naval blockade of the Strait of Otranto – was conducted by Novara, escorted by 79 T, 81 T, and the Kaiman-class boat 71 T on 3 April. (Note: The naval historian Zvonimir Freivogel observes that the information about the raid comes from a 1996 book by the Austrian naval historian Franz Bilzer, but Erwin Sieche, another Austrian naval historian, states in his 2012 book that there is no mention of this operation in the war diaries of the ships involved.) On the night of 31 May/1 June 1916, the Tátra-class destroyers Orjen and Balaton, accompanied by 79 T, 77 T and 81 T, raided the Otranto Barrage. Orjen sank one drifter with a torpedo, but once the alarm had been raised, the Austro-Hungarian force withdrew. After laying mines off the town of Rovigno in western Istria on 29 June, 79 T was transferred to the Bocche on 10 August.

During 1917, 79 T was often employed in the minesweeping role and also escorted 34 convoys. In the same year, one of 79 T's 66 mm guns may have been placed on an anti-aircraft mount. According to Freivogel, sources vary on whether these mounts were added to all boats of the class, and on whether these mounts were added to the forward or aft gun. On 20 March, 79 T, 74 T, 77 T and 81 T comprised the 1st Torpedo Boat Group of the 3rd Torpedo Division. On 21 May of that year, the suffix of all Austro-Hungarian torpedo boats was removed, and thereafter they were referred to only by their numeral. On 28 November, several 250t-class boats were involved in two shore bombardment missions. In the first mission, 79 and two other 250t-class boats supported the bombardment of Senigallia by three destroyers, before they were joined by five more 250t-class boats and another three destroyers for the bombardment of Porto Corsini, Marotta and Cesenatico. The bombardment damaged the railway tracks between Senigallia and Rimini and destroyed one locomotive and several wagons, but when the flotilla moved to attack two small steamers, an Italian armoured train arrived and engaged them with its 15 cm (6 in) guns, and they broke off. On the return voyage to Pola, the ships were apparently pursued by Italian warships, but Admiral Spaun sailed to provide support, and the Italians withdrew. On 1 February 1918, a mutiny broke out among the sailors of some vessels of the Austro-Hungarian Navy at the Đenovići anchorage within the Bocche, largely over poor food, lack of replacement uniforms and supplies, and insufficient leave, although the poor state of the Austro-Hungarian economy and its impact on their families was also a factor. At the time, 79 was underway to Antivari, but as she passed the Luštica peninsula she received an order to return to Đenovići. Her captain realised the situation and instead he moored in the Castelnuovo anchorage and put his crew ashore. Loyal ships were despatched to the Bocche from Pola, but by the time they arrived on 3 February, the mutiny had ended, and 79 returned to Đenovići. On 9 May, 79 and 76 along with several Huszár-class destroyers escorted the two Erzherzog Karl-class battleships, Erzherzog Ferdinand Max and Erzherzog Friedrich, to the Bocche.

By 1918, the Allies had strengthened their ongoing blockade on the Strait of Otranto, as foreseen by the Austro-Hungarian Navy. As a result, it was becoming more difficult for the German and Austro-Hungarian U-boats to get through the strait and into the Mediterranean Sea. In response to these blockades, the new commander of the Austro-Hungarian Navy, Konteradmiral Miklós Horthy, decided to launch an attack on the Allied defenders with battleships, scout cruisers, and destroyers. During the night of 8/9 June 1918, Horthy left the naval base of Pola in the upper Adriatic with the dreadnought battleships Viribus Unitis and Prinz Eugen. At about 23:00 on 9 June, after some difficulties getting the harbour defence barrage opened, the dreadnoughts Szent István and Tegetthoff, escorted by one destroyer and six torpedo boats, including 79, also departed Pola and set course for Slano, north of Ragusa, to rendezvous with Horthy in preparation for a coordinated attack on the Otranto Barrage. About 03:15 on 10 June, (Note: Sources differ on what the exact time was when the attack took place. Sieche states that the time was 03:15 when the Szent István was hit, but Sokol reports the time as 03:30.) while returning from an uneventful patrol off the Dalmatian coast, two Italian MAS boats, MAS 15 and MAS 21, spotted the smoke from the Austro-Hungarian ships. With their engines off, the two Italian boats waited for the lead ships of the starboard escort to pass, before launching their attack. Both boats successfully penetrated the escort screen and split to engage the dreadnoughts individually. MAS 21 attacked Tegetthoff, but her torpedoes missed. Under the command of Luigi Rizzo, MAS 15 fired two torpedoes at 03:25, both of which hit Szent István. Both boats evaded pursuit. The torpedo hits on Szent István were abreast of her boiler rooms, which flooded, knocking out power to the pumps. Szent István capsized less than three hours after being torpedoed, and 79 rescued several members of her crew. This disaster essentially ended Austro-Hungarian fleet operations in the Adriatic for the remaining months of the war.

Transferred to Triest on 16 June, 79's final action of the war was on 26 September when, along with the Huszár-class destroyers Dinara, Reka and Scharfschutze, 87, 89 and 96, she escorted three Austro-Hungarian steamers from the Bocche to Durazzo. This convoy was attacked by the British submarine H1 near Cape Menders (current day Cape Mandra near Ulcinj, Montenegro). The destroyers repelled the attack, assisted by the torpedo boats and a seaplane, but were unable to damage the submarine. During 1918, 79 escorted 47 convoys and completed 4 minesweeping missions. As the end of the war approached in November and the Austro-Hungarian Empire broke apart, the boat was based at the Bocche, and on 1 November it was ceded to the State of Slovenes, Croats and Serbs, which was a short-lived fragment of the empire which united with the Kingdom of Serbia and Kingdom of Montenegro on 1 December, becoming the Kingdom of Serbs, Croats and Slovenes (from 1929, the Kingdom of Yugoslavia).

=== Post World War I ===
The Austro-Hungarian Empire sued for peace in November 1918, and 79 survived the war intact. Immediately after the Austro-Hungarian capitulation, French troops occupied the Bocche, which was treated by the Allies as Austro-Hungarian territory. During the French occupation, the captured Austro-Hungarian Navy ships moored at the Bocche were neglected, and 79's original torpedo tubes were destroyed or damaged by French troops. In 1920, under the terms of the previous year's Treaty of Saint-Germain-en-Laye by which rump Austria officially ended World War I, 79 was allocated to the Kingdom of Serbs, Croats and Slovenes (KSCS, later Yugoslavia). Along with 76, 77 and 78, and four 250t-class F-group boats, she served with the Royal Yugoslav Navy (Serbo-Croatian: Kraljevska mornarica, KM, Краљевска морнарица). Taken over in March 1921 when French forces withdrew, in KM service, 79 was renamed T4. At the outset, she and the other seven 250t-class boats were the only modern sea-going vessels in the KM.

New torpedo tubes of the same size were ordered from the Strojne Tovarne factory in Ljubljana. In KM service it was intended to replace one or both guns on each boat of the 250t class with a longer Škoda 66 mm L/45 gun, and it is believed that this included the forward gun on T4. She was also fitted with one or two Zbrojovka 15 mm (0.59 in) machine guns. In KM service, the crew increased to 52, and she was commissioned in 1923. In 1925, exercises were conducted off the Dalmatian coast, involving the majority of the KM. During a 1927 refit T4 was re-armed with a pair of Škoda 75 mm (3.0 in) L/30 guns that had been manufactured as deck guns for submarines, and were procured from the Škoda works in Plzeň, Czechoslovakia. In May and June 1929, six of the eight 250t-class torpedo boats – including T4 – accompanied the light cruiser Dalmacija, the submarine tender Hvar and the submarines Hrabri and Nebojša, on a cruise to Malta, the Greek island of Corfu in the Ionian Sea, and Bizerte in the French protectorate of Tunisia. The ships and their crews made a very good impression on the British while visiting Malta. In 1932, the British naval attaché reported that Yugoslav ships engaged in few exercises, manoeuvres or gunnery training due to reduced budgets. In the same year, T4 ran aground on the island of Drvenik Mali off the central Dalmatian coast. The hull broke in half; the bow remained on the island, and the stern was towed to the Tivat Arsenal in the Bay of Kotor, 240 km (150 mi) to the south. As a result, it became a standing joke among KM sailors that this made T4 the "world's longest torpedo boat". Eventually both sections were scrapped where they were.

== See also ==
- List of ships of the Royal Yugoslav Navy
