= Yugoslav torpedo boat T2 =

Yugoslav torpedo boat

T2
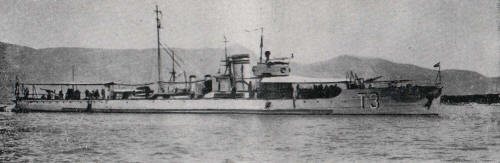
- One of T2's sister ships, T3

History

Austria-Hungary
- Name: 77 T then 77
- Builder: Stabilimento Tecnico Triestino
- Laid down: 24 August 1913
- Launched: 30 January 1914
- Commissioned: 11 August 1914
- Out of service: 1918
- Fate: Assigned to the Kingdom of Serbs, Croats and Slovenes

Kingdom of Yugoslavia
- Name: T2
- Acquired: March 1921
- Commissioned: 1923
- Out of service: 1939
- Fate: Scrapped

General characteristics
- Class & type: 250t-class, T-group sea-going torpedo boat
- Displacement: 262 t (258 long tons); 267.3 t (263 long tons) (full load)
- Length: 57.84 m (189 ft 9 in)
- Beam: 5.75 m (18 ft 10 in)
- Draught: 1.54 m (5 ft 1 in)
- Installed power: 5,000–5,700 shp (3,700–4,300 kW); 2 × Yarrow water-tube boilers
- Propulsion: 2 × shafts; 2 × Parsons steam turbines
- Speed: 28 knots (52 km/h; 32 mph)
- Range: 1,000 nmi (1,900 km; 1,200 mi) at 16 knots (30 km/h; 18 mph)
- Complement: 41 officers and enlisted
- Armament: 2 × Škoda 66 mm (2.6 in) L/30 guns; 4 × 450 mm (17.7 in) torpedo tubes; 10–12 naval mines

T2 was a seagoing torpedo boat operated by the Royal Yugoslav Navy between 1923 and 1939. Originally 77 T, a 250t-class torpedo boat of the Austro-Hungarian Navy built in 1914, she was armed with two 66 mm (2.6 in) guns and four 450 mm (17.7 in) torpedo tubes, and could carry 10–12 naval mines. She saw active service during World War I, performing convoy, patrol, escort, minesweeping and minelaying tasks, anti-submarine operations, and shore bombardment missions. In 1917, the suffixes of all Austro-Hungarian torpedo boats were removed, and thereafter she was referred to as 77. The vessel was in the Bocche di Cattaro during the short-lived mutiny by Austro-Hungarian sailors in early February 1918; members of her crew raised the red flag but undertook no other mutinous actions. 77 was part of the escort force for the Austro-Hungarian dreadnought Szent István during the action that resulted in the sinking of that ship by Italian torpedo boats in June 1918.

Following Austria-Hungary's defeat in 1918, 77 was allocated to the Navy of the Kingdom of Serbs, Croats and Slovenes, which later became the Royal Yugoslav Navy, and was renamed T2 and had her armament upgraded. At the time, she and seven other 250t-class boats were the only modern sea-going vessels of the fledgling maritime force. During the interwar period, the navy was involved in training exercises and cruises to friendly ports, but activity was limited by reduced naval budgets. Worn out after twenty-five years of service, T2 was stricken from the naval register and scrapped in 1939.

== Background ==
In 1910, the Austria-Hungary Naval Technical Committee initiated the design and development of a 275-tonne (271-long-ton) coastal torpedo boat, specifying that it should be capable of sustaining 30 knots (56 km/h; 35 mph) for 10 hours. At the same time, the committee issued design parameters for a high seas or fleet torpedo boat of 500–550 t (490–540 long tons), top speed of 30 kn and endurance of 480 nautical miles (890 km; 550 mi). This design would have been a larger and better-armed vessel than the existing Austro-Hungarian 400-tonne (390-long-ton) Huszár-class destroyers. The specification for the high seas torpedo boat was based on an expectation that the Strait of Otranto, where the Adriatic Sea meets the Ionian Sea, would be blockaded by hostile forces during a future conflict. In such circumstances, there would be a need for a torpedo boat that could sail from the Austro-Hungarian Navy (German: kaiserliche und königliche Kriegsmarine, Hungarian: Császári és Királyi Haditengerészet) base at the Bocche di Cattaro (the Bocche or Bay of Kotor) to the strait during the night, locate and attack blockading ships and return to port before morning. Steam turbine power was selected for propulsion, as diesels with the necessary power were not available, and the Austro-Hungarian Navy did not have the practical experience to run turbo-electric boats. Despite having developed these ideas, the Austro-Hungarian Navy then asked shipyards to submit proposals for a 250 t (250-long-ton) boat with a maximum speed of 28 kn (52 km/h; 32 mph). Stabilimento Tecnico Triestino (STT) of Triest was selected for the contract to build eight vessels, the T group, ahead of one other tenderer. The T-group designation signified that they were built at Triest.

== Description and construction ==
The 250t-class, T-group boats had short raised forecastles and an open bridge, and were fast and agile, well designed for service in the Adriatic. They had a waterline length of 57.84 m (189 ft 9 in), a beam of 5.75 m (18 ft 10 in), and a normal draught of 1.54 m (5 ft 1 in). While their designed displacement was 262 tonnes (258 long tons), they displaced about 267.3 tonnes (263 long tons) fully loaded. The boats were powered by two Parsons steam turbines driving two propellers, using steam generated by two Yarrow water-tube boilers, one of which burned fuel oil and the other coal. There were two boiler rooms, one behind the other. The turbines were rated at 5,000–5,700 shaft horsepower (3,700–4,300 kW) and designed to propel the boats to a top speed of 28 kn (52 km/h; 32 mph), although a maximum speed of 29.2 kn (54.1 km/h; 33.6 mph) could be achieved. They carried 18.2 t (17.9 long tons) of coal and 24.3 t (23.9 long tons) of fuel oil, which gave them a range of 1,000 nautical miles (1,900 km; 1,200 mi) at 16 kn (30 km/h; 18 mph). The T group had one funnel rather than the two funnels of the later groups of the class. 79 T and the rest of the 250t class were classified as high seas torpedo boats by the Austro-Hungarian Navy, despite being smaller than the original concept for a coastal torpedo boat. The naval historian Zvonimir Freivogel states that this type of situation was common due to the parsimony of the Austro-Hungarian Navy. They were the first small Austro-Hungarian Navy boats to use turbines, and this contributed to ongoing problems with them, which had to be progressively solved once they were in service. The crew consisted of three officers and thirty-eight enlisted men. The vessel carried one 4 m (13 ft) yawl as a ship's boat.

The boats were originally to be armed with three Škoda 66 mm (2.6 in) L/30 (Note: L/30 denotes the length of the gun's barrel. In this case, the L/30 gun is 30 calibre, meaning that the barrel was 30 times as long as the diameter of its bore.) guns, and three 450 mm (17.7 in) torpedo tubes, but this was changed to two guns and four torpedo tubes before the first boat was completed, to standardise the armament with the F group to follow. A 40 cm (16 in) searchlight was mounted above the bridge. The torpedo tubes were mounted in pairs, with one pair mounted between the forecastle and bridge, and the other on a section of raised superstructure above the aft machinery room. They could also carry 10–12 naval mines.

The fourth of its class to be completed, 77 T was laid down on 24 August 1913, launched on 30 January 1914, and completed and commissioned on 11 August 1914. Prior to her commissioning, one 8 mm (0.31 in) Schwarzlose M.7/12 machine gun was included in the armament of all boats of the class for anti-aircraft work. Four mounting points were installed so that the machine gun could be mounted in the most effective position depending on the expected direction of attack. Until October 1915, the boat was painted black, but from that point it was painted a light blue-grey.

== Career ==
=== World War I ===
At the outbreak of World War I on 28 July 1914, 77 T was part of the 1st Torpedo Group of the 3rd Torpedo Craft Division of the Austro-Hungarian 1st Torpedo Craft Flotilla, which was led by the scout cruiser Saida commanded by Linienschiffskapitän (Captain) Heinrich Seitz, and supported by the mother ship Gäa. The original concept of operation for the 250t-class boats was that they would sail in a flotilla at the rear of a cruising battle formation, and were to intervene in fighting only if the battleships around which the formation was established were disabled, or to attack damaged enemy battleships. When a torpedo attack was ordered, it was to be led by a scout cruiser, supported by two destroyers to repel any enemy torpedo boats. A group of four to six torpedo boats would deliver the attack under the direction of the flotilla commander.

During the war, 77 T was used for convoy, patrol, escort and minesweeping tasks, anti-submarine operations, and shore bombardment missions. 77 T was transferred to Sebenico on 16 August. In early September, intelligence was received by the Austro-Hungarian command that an Italian volunteer corps were planning to land on the Dalmatian or Istrian coast, and the 1st Torpedo Flotilla was involved in fruitless patrolling off Sebenico and Zara between 19 and 24 September. According to the naval historian Zvonimir Freivogel, this was disinformation that allegedly originated with the French and was intended to keep the Austro-Hungarian fleet engaged while the French conducted operations in the southern Adriatic undisturbed. On the evening of 3 November, the 1st Torpedo Flotilla left Sebenico to make a night torpedo attack on the French fleet, which had begun its seventh raid on the Adriatic on 31 October. By the time they reached the threatened areas, the French had withdrawn as they were running low on coal. On 6 November, 77 T conducted a patrol off the Dalmatian island of Lastovo, and returned to the main fleet base at Pola in the upper Adriatic on 23 December.

On 10 May 1915, during the lead-up to the Italian declaration of war on Austria-Hungary, 77 T swept the approaches to the Italian port of Ancona for mines. On the afternoon of 23 May, and almost the entire Austro-Hungarian fleet left Pola soon after to deliver an immediate response against Italian cities and towns along the Adriatic coast, aiming to interdict land and sea transport between southern Italy and the northern regions of that country which were expected to be a theatre of land operations. The fleet split into six groups with a range of targets up and down the coast. On 24 May 1915, 77 T and seven other 250t-class boats participated in the Bombardment of Ancona, which involved shelling Italian shore-based targets, 77 T being involved in the operation against Ancona itself. 77 T laid defensive mines off the Dalmatian port of Split on 6 June. On the night of 18/19 June, separate Austro-Hungarian naval task groups attacked both Venice and Rimini, with distant cover provided by a group led by Saida and the scout cruiser Helgoland and consisting of three destroyers and five 250t-class boats, one of which was 77 T. Near San Benedetto del Tronto, this group intercepted and sank the Italian steamer Grazia. Immediately after this operation, 77 T underwent a refit at Pola. On 23 July, 77 T and another 250t-class boat participated in another shore bombardment mission led by Helgoland against Ortona on the central Adriatic coast of Italy. (Note: According to Cernuschi and O'Hara, the 23 July operation involved 74 T and 78 T in a shore bombardment and landing operation led by Saida against San Benedetto del Tronto, Ortona and Termoli. Freivogel states that a separate group of destroyers attacked Termoli and Campomarino, and a landing party from two more destroyers cut the telegraph cable on the Tremiti Islands, and does not mention the involvement of Saida.) 77 T was involved in an attack on the island chain of Pelagosa in the middle of the Adriatic on 28 July. On 17 August, the 1st Torpedo Flotilla again shelled Pelagosa, and 77 T was part of a force led by Saida tasked to protect the southern approaches to the islands from enemy submarines. The success of this bombardment, which destroyed the only source of drinking water, caused the Italians to abandon Pelagosa. 77 T again bombarded Pelagosa on 9 September. During September she conducted patrols between the islands of Lastovo, Pelagosa, and Biševo and the Italian port of Bari.

In late November 1915, the Austro-Hungarian fleet deployed a force from Pola to Cattaro in the southern Adriatic; this group included six of the eight T-group torpedo boats. This force was tasked with maintaining a permanent patrol of the Albanian coastline and interdict any troop transports crossing from Italy. After an attack on Durazzo in Albania in which two Austro-Hungarian destroyers were sunk after straying out of a cleared lane through a minefield, on 30 December 77 T and four other 250t-class boats were sent south with the scout cruiser Novara to strengthen morale and try to prevent the transfer of the captured crew of one of the destroyers to Italy. No Italian ships were encountered, and the group returned to the Bocche the following day.

On 17 January 1916, 77 T salvaged a damaged Austro-Hungarian seaplane near the Montenegrin coastal town of Petrovac and towed it to the Bocche. On 22 February, 77 T and two other 250t-class boats, accompanied by a Kaiman-class torpedo boat, laid a minefield outside the Montenegrin port of Antivari. With Austro-Hungarian forces closing on Durazzo from the land, the Allies began to evacuate by sea, and Austro-Hungarian naval forces were sent to attempt to interdict. On 24 February, Helgoland, four destroyers, 77 T and five other 250t-class boats were sent to intercept four Italian destroyers covering the evacuation, but were unable to locate them. Between 11 March and 2 May 77 T underwent a further refit at Pola, and on 4 May was transferred to the Bocche. On the night of 31 May – 1 June, the Tátra-class destroyers Orjen and Balaton, accompanied by 77 T and two other 250t-class boats, raided the Otranto Barrage, an Allied naval blockade of the Strait of Otranto. Orjen sank the British drifter Beneficent, but once the alarm had been raised, the Austro-Hungarian force withdrew. 77 T laid mines off Cape Rodoni – north of Durazzo – on 29 June, and returned to Pola in July. On the night of 23/24 September, 77 T and three other 250t boats laid mines off the Po River estuary near Venice. On 12 October, 77 T was attacked by enemy aircraft about 19 km (12 mi) west of the Pinida lighthouse on the eastern coast of Istria.

In 1917, one of 77 T's 66 mm guns may have been placed on an anti-aircraft mount. According to the naval historian Zvonimir Freivogel, sources vary on whether these mounts were added to all boats of the class, and on whether these mounts were added to the forward or aft gun. On 3 February 1917 she was transferred to the Bocche, and four days later she conveyed the German Vizeadmiral Hugo Kraft to Pola for an inspection. During a storm on 8 February, a crew member fell overboard in the Bay of Kvarner and drowned. On 21 May, the suffix of all Austro-Hungarian torpedo boats was removed, and thereafter they were referred to only by their numeral. 77 was again transferred to the Bocche on 17 August. On 23 September 1917, 77 and another 250t-class boat were laying a minefield off Grado in the northern Adriatic when they had a brief encounter with a Royal Italian Navy (Italian: Regia Marina) MAS motor torpedo boat. During 1917, 77 conducted two minesweeping operations and escorted thirty-six convoys.

On 1 February 1918, a mutiny broke out among the sailors of some vessels of the Austro-Hungarian Navy at the Đenovići anchorage within the Bocche, largely over poor food, lack of replacement uniforms and supplies, and insufficient leave, although the poor state of the Austro-Hungarian economy and its impact on their families was also a factor. 77 was present in the anchorage, and one of her crew raised a red flag, but the executive officer ordered the flag be lowered. The commanding officer of the group of four 250t boats including 77 to light their boilers, intending to order the boats to leave the vicinity of Sankt George and Gäa – which were both controlled by mutineers – but the mutineers ordered the boiler fires put out. The following day, while her commanding officer was absent, a red flag was again raised on 77. Other torpedo boats followed the lead of 77, but by 3 February the revolt was over, and the mutinous sailors were removed from all affected vessels. Five days later, 77 was transferred to Pola for repairs, but by 14–15 February was operational again, chasing an enemy submarine.

By 1918, the Allies had strengthened their ongoing blockade on the Strait of Otranto, as foreseen by the Austro-Hungarian Navy. As a result, it was becoming more difficult for the German and Austro-Hungarian U-boats to get through the strait and into the Mediterranean Sea. In response to these blockades, the new commander of the Austro-Hungarian Navy, Konteradmiral Miklós Horthy, decided to launch an attack on the Allied defenders with battleships, scout cruisers, and destroyers. During the night of 8/9 June 1918, Horthy left Pola with the dreadnought battleships Viribus Unitis and Prinz Eugen. At about 23:00 on 9 June, after some difficulties getting the harbour defence barrage opened, the dreadnoughts Szent István and Tegetthoff, escorted by one destroyer and six torpedo boats, including 77, also departed Pola and set course for Slano, north of Ragusa, to rendezvous with Horthy in preparation for a coordinated attack on the Otranto Barrage. About 03:15 on 10 June, (Note: Sources differ on what the exact time was when the attack took place. Sieche states that the time was 03:15 when the Szent István was hit; Sokol claims that the time was 03:30.) while returning from an uneventful patrol off the Dalmatian coast, two Italian MAS boats, MAS 15 and MAS 21, spotted the smoke from the Austro-Hungarian ships. With their engines off, the two Italian boats waited for the lead ships of the starboard escort, the Huszár-class destroyer Velebit and 77, to pass, before launching their attack. Both boats successfully penetrated the escort screen and split to engage the dreadnoughts individually. MAS 21 attacked Tegetthoff, but her torpedoes missed. Under the command of Luigi Rizzo, MAS 15 fired two torpedoes at 03:25, both of which hit Szent István. Both boats evaded pursuit. The torpedo hits on Szent István were abreast of her boiler rooms, which flooded, knocking out power to the pumps. Szent István capsized less than three hours after being torpedoed. 77 helped rescue survivors from Szent István. This disaster essentially ended Austro-Hungarian fleet operations in the Adriatic for the remaining months of the war.

Soon after this event, Linienschiffsleutnant Armin Pavić took command of 77 – Pavić went on to reach the rank of kontraadmiral in the interwar Royal Yugoslav Navy (Serbo-Croatian Latin: Kraljevska mornarica, KM; Краљевска морнарица). During 1918, 77 conducted seven anti-submarine missions, six minesweeping operations, and escorted twenty-three convoys. As the end of the war approached in November and the Austro-Hungarian Empire broke apart, on 1 November the boat was ceded to the State of Slovenes, Croats and Serbs, which was a short-lived fragment of the empire which united with the Kingdom of Serbia and Kingdom of Montenegro on 1 December, becoming the Kingdom of Serbs, Croats and Slovenes (from 1929, the Kingdom of Yugoslavia).

=== Post World War I ===
The Austro-Hungarian Empire sued for peace in November 1918, and 77 survived the war intact. Immediately after the Austro-Hungarian capitulation, French troops occupied Cattaro, which was treated by the Allies as Austro-Hungarian territory. During the French occupation, the captured Austro-Hungarian Navy ships moored at Cattaro were neglected, and 77's original torpedo tubes were destroyed or damaged by French troops. In 1920, under the terms of the previous year's Treaty of Saint-Germain-en-Laye, which officially ended the participation of rump Austria in World War I, she was allocated to the Kingdom of Serbs, Croats and Slovenes (later Yugoslavia). Along with three other 250t-class T-group boats, 76, 78 and 79, and four 250t-class F-group boats, she served with the KM. Taken over in March 1921 when French forces withdrew, in KM service, 77 was renamed T2.

When the navy was formed, she and the other seven 250t-class boats were the only modern sea-going vessels in the KM. New torpedo tubes of the same size were ordered from the Strojne Tovarne factory in Ljubljana. In KM service it was intended to replace one or both guns on each boat of the 250t class with a longer Škoda 66 mm L/45 gun, and according to Freivogel this included the forward gun on T2. She was also fitted with one or two Zbrojovka 15 mm (0.59 in) machine guns. In KM service, the crew increased to 52, and she was commissioned in 1923. In 1925, exercises were conducted off the Dalmatian coast, involving the majority of the KM. T2 underwent a refit in 1927. In 1932, the British naval attaché reported that Yugoslav ships engaged in few exercises, manoeuvres or gunnery training due to reduced budgets. By 1939, the maximum speed achieved by the 250t class in Yugoslav service had declined to 24 kn (44 km/h; 28 mph), and in that year T2 was stricken from the naval register due to her age and scrapped soon after.

== See also ==
- List of ships of the Royal Yugoslav Navy
