= SMS Novara =

SMS Novara may refer to one of two ships of the Austro-Hungarian Navy, both named after the 1849 Battle of Novara in which Austrian forces had defeated troops of the Kingdom of Sardinia:

- SMS Novara (1850), a sail frigate most noted for its 1857–59 scientific circumnavigation expedition. Eventually scrapped in 1899.
- SMS Novara (1913), a scout cruiser which served in World War I and was later transferred to France as a war prize in 1920. Renamed Thionville, it continued to serve before being scrapped in 1941.
