= Greek torpedo boat Kios =

Greek military vessel

History

Greece
- Ordered: January 16, 1912
- Laid down: March 22, 1914
- Launched: December 17, 1914
- Acquired: 1920 as war reparation from Austria-Hungary
- Commissioned: 1920
- Decommissioned: April 22, 1941
- Fate: Scuttled in the Saronic Gulf during German invasion of Greece 1941

General characteristics
- Displacement: 270 tons standard
- Length: 60.5 m (198 ft)
- Beam: 5.6 m (18 ft)
- Draft: 1.5 m (4.9 ft)
- Propulsion: 5,000 shp; 2 Yarrow boilers; 2 set Melms & Pfenniger turbines
- Speed: 31 knots (57 km/h) maximum (32 knots (59 km/h) after 1925)
- Complement: 38
- Armament: 2 × 66 mm (2.6 in) L/30, AA:2 machine guns, 4 × 450 mm torpedo tubes (2 × 2)

The Greek torpedo boat Kios (Greek: TA Κίος) served in the Royal Hellenic Navy from 1920–1941. Originally the ship was the Austro-Hungarian Fiume-class torpedo boat SMS Tb 99-M. She was named for the ancient Greek city of Kios (today known as Gemlik) located in Anatolia; the city was part of the territory awarded to Greece for joining the side of the allied in the Treaty of Sèvres at the end of World War I.

The ship, along with two sister ships of Monfalcone-built torpedo boats Kydonia and Kyzikos, was transferred to Greece as a war reparation from the Central Powers in 1920.

== Service in the Austro-Hungarian navy ==
In the build-up to the First World War, Austria-Hungary ordered four 250–tonne boats to be built at the Ganz & Co.– Danubius shipyard in 1912/13. The Navy asked for several improvements compared with the Trieste–class boats. Negotiations broke down in early December because of exaggerated prices requested by Danubius and were only resumed when pressured by the Hungarian Minister of Commerce. Danubius lowered its price by 10%. Finally, Ganz & Co. – Danubius got orders for 16 torpedo boats in 1913, despite the fact that original plans had called for the Naval Arsenal Pola to build the Tb 86 to Tb 100 series. These ‘Monfalcone–boats’ were commissioned under the numbers Tb 98 M to Tb 100 M between March 1915 and March 1916. They differed from their Trieste sister–ships having two funnels and an extended forecastle. They were very similar to the Fiume-built ships of the same series.

== Service in the Hellenic navy ==
Kios served in the Hellenic navy from 1920 until she was scuttled at sea near Athens during the German invasion of Greece on April 22, 1941.

== See also ==
- History of the Hellenic Navy
