= SMS Magnet =

History

Austria-Hungary
- Name: Magnet
- Builder: Schichau-Werke, Elbing, German Empire
- Laid down: September 1895
- Launched: 21 March 1896
- Completed: 5 July 1896
- Fate: Ceded to Italy, 1920, and scrapped

General characteristics
- Type: Torpedo boat destroyer
- Displacement: 485 t (477 long tons)
- Length: 71 m (232 ft 11 in) (o/a)
- Beam: 8.2 m (26 ft 11 in)
- Draught: 3.2 m (10 ft 6 in) (deep load)
- Installed power: 4 × water-tube boilers; 5,652 ihp (4,215 kW)
- Propulsion: 2 shafts; 2 triple-expansion engines
- Speed: 25 knots (46 km/h; 29 mph)
- Range: 2,000 nmi (3,700 km; 2,300 mi) at 12 knots (22 km/h; 14 mph)
- Complement: 85
- Armament: 6 × single 47 mm (1.9 in) guns; 3 × single 45 cm (17.7 in) torpedo tubes

SMS Magnet was a torpedo boat destroyer, the only ship in her class, built for the Austro-Hungarian Navy in Germany during the 1890s. Completed in 1896, she served in World War I and was ceded to Italy as war reparations in 1920. The ship was scrapped shortly afterwards.

== Design and description ==
Magnet measured 71 meters (232 ft 11 in) long overall with a beam of 8.2 meters (26 ft 11 in), and a draft of 3.2 meters (10 ft 6 in) at deep load. The ship normally displaced 485 metric tons (477 long tons). She was propelled by two triple-expansion steam engines, each driving one propeller shaft using steam from four Thornycroft boilers]. The engines produced a total of 5,652 indicated horsepower (4,215 kW) for an intended maximum speed of 25 knots (46 km/h; 29 mph). During her sea trials, Magnet reached a sustained speed of 25.72 knots (47.63 km/h; 29.60 mph) for five hours. She carried 100 t (98 long tons) of coal which was enough to give her a range of 2,000 nautical miles (3,700 km; 2,300 mi) at 12 knots (22 km/h; 14 mph) knots. Their crew numbered 85 officers and men.

The main armament of Magnet consisted of six 47-millimeter (1.9 in) guns. One gun each was positioned on the forecastle and the stern. Two guns were located on the superstructure and the remaining pair abreast the rear funnel; these guns were on the broadside. The ships were equipped with three 450-millimeter (17.7 in) torpedo tubes in single, rotating mounts. Two of these was located on the broadside aft of the forward funnel the while the other was positioned between the aft superstructure and the stern gun. After Magnet had her stern blown off by a torpedo in 1916, the ship was rearmed with two 45-caliber Škoda 66-millimeter (2.6 in) guns that replaced her bow and stern guns. A 8-millimeter (0.31 in) Schwarzlose M.7/12 anti-aircraft machine gun was also added.

== Construction and career ==
Magnet was laid down in September 1895 by Schichau-Werke at their shipyard in Elbing, East Prussia, and launched on 21 March 1896. She was turned over to the Austro-Hungarian Navy on 5 July and arrived at Pula on 2 August. The ship was ceded to Italy in 1920 and broken up shortly afterward.

== Bibliography ==
- Cernuschi, Enrico & O'Hara, Vincent (2015). "The Naval War in the Adriatic Part 1: 1914–1916". In Jordan, John (ed.). Warship 2015. London: Conway. pp. 161–173. ISBN 978-1-84486-276-4.
- Cernuschi, Enrico & O'Hara, Vincent (2016). "The Naval War in the Adriatic, Part 2: 1917–1918". In Jordan, John (ed.). Warship 2016. London: Conway. pp. 62–75. ISBN 978-1-84486-326-6.
- Dodson, Aidan & Cant, Serena (2020). Spoils of War: The Fate of Enemy Fleets after Two World Wars. Seaforth Publishing. ISBN 978-1-5267-4198-1.
- Freivogel, Zvonimir (2021). Austro-Hungarian Destroyers in World War One. Despot Infinitus. ISBN 978-953-366-051-6.
- O'Hara, Vincent P. & Heinz, Leonard R. (2017). Clash of Fleets: Naval Battles of the Great War, 1914-18. Naval Institute Press. ISBN 978-1-68247-008-4.
