= Yugoslav torpedo boat T3 =

Austro-Hungarian then Yugoslav torpedo boat operating between 1921 and 1945

T3
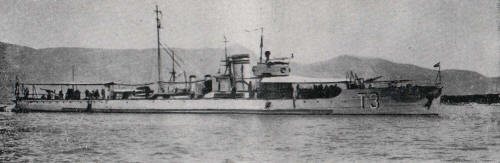
- T3 underway in 1931

History

Austria-Hungary
- Name: 78 T then 78
- Builder: Stabilimento Tecnico Triestino
- Laid down: 22 October 1913
- Launched: 4 March 1914
- Commissioned: 23 August 1914
- Out of service: 1918
- Fate: Assigned to the Kingdom of Serbs, Croats and Slovenes

Kingdom of Yugoslavia
- Name: T3
- Acquired: March 1921
- Out of service: April 1941
- Fate: Captured by Italy

Italy
- Name: T3
- Acquired: April 1941
- Out of service: 16 September 1943
- Fate: Captured by German forces at Rijeka

Nazi Germany
- Name: TA48
- Acquired: 16 September 1943
- Out of service: 1945
- Fate: Sunk at Trieste by Allied bombing on 20 February 1945
- Notes: Crewed by Croatian sailors

General characteristics
- Class & type: 250t-class, T-group sea-going torpedo boat
- Displacement: 237 t (233 long tons); 324 t (319 long tons) (full load)
- Length: 57.3 m (188 ft 0 in)
- Beam: 5.7 m (18 ft 8 in)
- Draught: 1.5 m (4 ft 11 in)
- Installed power: 5,000 shp (3,700 kW); 2 × Yarrow boilers
- Propulsion: 2 × shafts; 2 × Parsons steam turbines
- Speed: 28 knots (52 km/h; 32 mph)
- Range: 1,000 nmi (1,900 km; 1,200 mi) at 16 knots (30 km/h; 18 mph)
- Complement: 41 officers and enlisted
- Armament: 2 × Škoda 66 mm (2.6 in) L/30 guns; 4 × 450 mm (17.7 in) torpedo tubes; 10–12 naval mines

T3 was a sea-going torpedo boat that was operated by the Royal Yugoslav Navy between 1921 and 1941. Originally 78 T, a 250t-class torpedo boat of the Austro-Hungarian Navy built in 1914, she was armed with two 66 mm (2.6 in) guns, four 450 mm (17.7 in) torpedo tubes, and could carry 10–12 naval mines. She saw active service during World War I, performing convoy, escort and minesweeping tasks, anti-submarine operations and shore bombardment missions. In 1917 the suffixes of all Austro-Hungarian torpedo boats were removed, and thereafter she was referred to as 78. She was part of the escort force for the Austro-Hungarian dreadnought Szent István during the action that resulted in the sinking of that ship by Italian torpedo boats in June 1918.

Following Austria-Hungary's defeat in 1918, she was allocated to the Navy of the Kingdom of Serbs, Croats and Slovenes, which later became the Royal Yugoslav Navy, and was renamed T3. At the time, she and the seven other 250t-class boats were the only modern sea-going vessels of the fledgling maritime force. During the interwar period, T3 and the rest of the navy were involved in training exercises and cruises to friendly ports, but activity was limited by reduced naval budgets. The ship was captured by the Italians during the Axis invasion of Yugoslavia in April 1941. After her main armament was modernised and her crew increased to 62, she served with the Royal Italian Navy under her Yugoslav designation, although she was only used for coastal and second-line tasks. Following the Italian capitulation in September 1943, she was captured by Germany and, after being fitted with additional anti-aircraft guns, served with the German Navy or the Navy of the Independent State of Croatia as TA48. In German/Croatian service her crew of 52 consisted entirely of Croatian officers and enlisted men. She was sunk by Allied aircraft in February 1945 while in the port of Trieste, where she had been built.

== Background ==
In 1910, the Austro-Hungarian Naval Technical Committee initiated the design and development of a 275-tonne (271-long-ton) coastal torpedo boat, specifying that it should be capable of sustaining 30 knots (56 km/h) for 10 hours. This specification was based on expectations that the Strait of Otranto, where the Adriatic Sea meets the Ionian Sea, would be blockaded by hostile forces during a future conflict. In such circumstances, there would be a need for a torpedo boat that could sail from the Austro-Hungarian Navy base at the Bocche di Cattaro (now Kotor) to the Strait during darkness, locate and attack blockading ships and return to port before morning. Steam turbine power was selected for propulsion, as diesels with the necessary power were not available, and the Austro-Hungarian Navy did not have the practical experience to run turbo-electric boats. Stabilimento Tecnico Triestino (STT) of Triest was selected for the contract to build eight vessels, ahead of one other tenderer. The T-group designation signified that they were built at Triest.

== Description and construction ==
The 250t-class, T-group boats had short raised forecastles and an open bridge, and were fast and agile, well designed for service in the Adriatic. They had a waterline length of 57.3 m (188 ft 0 in), a beam of 5.7 m (18 ft 8 in), and a normal draught of 1.5 m (4 ft 11 in). While their designed displacement was 237 tonnes (233 long tons), they displaced about 324 tonnes (319 long tons) fully loaded. The crew consisted of three officers and thirty-eight enlisted men. The boats were powered by two Parsons steam turbines driving two propellers, using steam generated by two Yarrow water-tube boilers, one of which burned fuel oil and the other coal. There were two boiler rooms, one behind the other. The turbines were rated at 5,000–5,700 shaft horsepower (3,700–4,300 kW) and designed to propel the boats to a top speed of 28 kn (52 km/h; 32 mph), although a maximum speed of 29.2 kn (54.1 km/h; 33.6 mph) could be achieved. They carried 18.2 t (17.9 long tons) of coal and 24.3 t (23.9 long tons) of fuel oil, which gave them a range of 1,000 nautical miles (1,900 km; 1,200 mi) at 16 kn (30 km/h; 18 mph). The T-group had one funnel rather than the two funnels of the later groups of the class, and had a large ventilation cowl under the bridge and another smaller one aft of the funnel. Due to an inadequate budget, 78 T and the rest of the 250t class were essentially large coastal vessels, despite the original intention that they would be used for "high seas" operations. They were the first small Austro-Hungarian Navy boats to use turbines, and this contributed to ongoing problems with them, which had to be progressively solved once they were in service.

The boats were originally to be armed with three Škoda 66 mm (2.6 in) L/30 (Note: L/30 denotes the length of the gun's barrel. In this case, the L/30 gun is 30 calibre, meaning that the barrel was 30 times as long as the diameter of its bore.) guns, and three 450 mm (17.7 in) torpedo tubes, but this was changed to two guns and four torpedo tubes before the first boat was completed, to standardise the armament with the F-group to follow. The torpedo tubes were mounted in pairs, with one pair mounted between the forecastle and bridge, and the other on a section of raised superstructure above the aft machinery room. They could also carry 10–12 naval mines. The fifth of its class to be built, 78 T was laid down on 22 October 1913, launched on 4 March 1914, and completed on 23 August 1914. Later that year, one 8 mm (0.31 in) machine gun was added for anti-aircraft work.

== Career ==
=== World War I ===
The original concept of operation for the 250t-class boats was that they would sail in a flotilla at the rear of a cruising battle formation, and were to intervene in fighting only if the battleships around which the formation was established were disabled, or in order to attack damaged enemy battleships. When a torpedo attack was ordered, it was to be led by a scout cruiser, supported by two destroyers to repel any enemy torpedo boats. A group of four to six torpedo boats would deliver the attack under the direction of the flotilla commander.

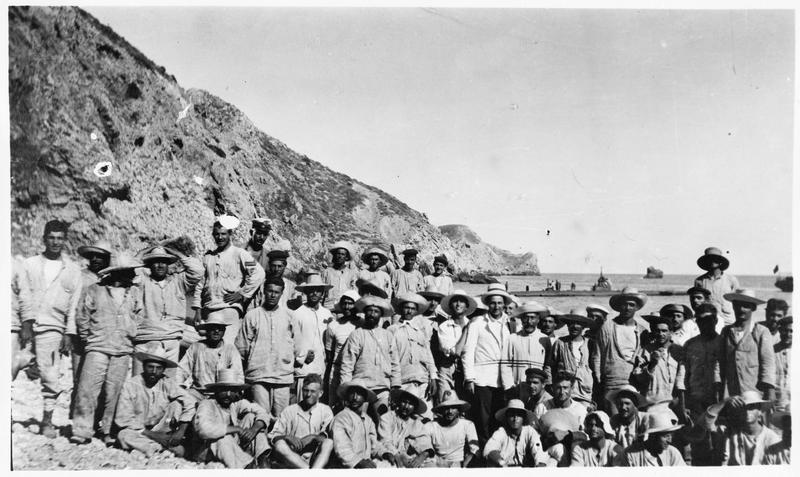
The island of Pelogosa was garrisoned by Italian sailors in 1915

On 24 May 1915, 78 T and seven other 250t-class boats were involved in the shelling of various Italian shore-based targets known as the Bombardment of Ancona, with 78 T involved in the shelling of Porto Corsini near Ravenna. In the latter action, an Italian 120 mm (4.7 in) shore battery returned fire, hitting the scout cruiser Novara and damaging one of the other 250t-class boats. On the night of 18/19 June, 78 T was part of a flotilla – consisting of two scout cruisers, three destroyers and five 250t-class boats – providing distant cover for a bombardment of Rimini and Pesaro when they encountered and sank the Italian steamer Grazia near San Benedetto del Tronto. On 23 July, 78 T and 77 T joined the scout cruiser Helgoland in bombarding Ortona as part of a 1st Torpedo Flotilla shore bombardment and landing operation on the central Adriatic coast of Italy which also targeted San Campomarino and Termoli and involved cutting the telegraph cable on the island of Tremiti. (Note: Cernuschi and O'Hara state that the operation was led by Saida, and that targets also included San Benedetto del Tronto.) On 17 August, the 1st Torpedo Flotilla shelled the island chain of Pelagosa in the middle of the Adriatic, and 78 T was part of a force tasked to protect the southern approaches to the islands from enemy submarines. The success of this bombardment, which destroyed the only source of drinking water, caused the Italians to abandon Pelagosa. In late November 1915, the Austro-Hungarian fleet deployed a force from its main fleet base at Pola to Cattaro in the southern Adriatic; this force included six of the eight T-group torpedo boats. This force was tasked to maintain a permanent patrol of the Albanian coastline and interdict any troop transports crossing from Italy. After an attack on Durazzo in Albania in which two Austro-Hungarian destroyers were sunk after straying out of a cleared lane through a minefield, on 30 December 78 T and four other 250t-class boats were sent south with the scout cruiser Novara in order to strengthen morale and try to prevent the transfer of the captured crew of one of the destroyers to Italy. No Italian ships were encountered, and the group returned to the Bocche the following day.

On 6 February 1916, Helgoland, 78 T and five other 250t-class boats were sent to intercept the British light cruiser HMS Liverpool and Italian Rosolino Pilo-class destroyer Pilade Bronzetti which had attacked Wildfang while she was escorting a seaplane raid. Instead of meeting the pair that had forced Wildfang to retreat, the Austro-Hungarian force encountered the British light cruiser HMS Weymouth and French Bouclier-class destroyer Bouclier – which had since relieved them – north of Durazzo in Albania. The torpedo boats manoeuvred into two groups of three for the attack, but in one of the groups two leading boats collided, with one sustaining damage, forcing that group to retreat to the port of Budva in Austro-Hungarian-occupied Montenegro, and the other group pressed their attack unsuccessfully. The entire Austro-Hungarian force then returned to the Bocche, having lost an opportunity to interdict significant convoy traffic further south between Albania and Italy. On 24 February, 78 T was part of an Austro-Hungarian force – consisting of a scout cruiser, four destroyers and five 250t-class boats – sent to disrupt the Allied evacuation of Durazzo, but encountered no Allied ships. In 1917, 78 T's forward 66 mm gun was placed on an anti-aircraft mount. On 11 May 1917, the British submarine HMS H1 stalked 78 T off Pola, firing two torpedoes at her. The British captain had kept his submarine's periscope extended too far and for too long, and the tell-tale "feather" had alerted the crew of 78 T, allowing her crew to avoid the incoming torpedoes. 78 T, 93 F and 96 F, accompanied by the Huszár-class destroyer Csikós, unsuccessfully pursued the British submarine. On 21 May, the suffix of all Austro-Hungarian torpedo boats was removed, and thereafter they were referred to only by the numeral. On 23 September, 77 and 78 were laying a minefield off Grado in the northern Adriatic when they had a brief encounter with an Italian MAS boat. While laying mines on routes between Venice and Ancona on 19 November, 78, along with four other 250t-class boats, was intercepted by four Italian destroyers but were able to escape damage. On 28 November, a number of 250t-class boats were involved in two shore bombardment missions. In the second mission, 78 joined seven other 250t-class boats and six destroyers for the bombardment of Porto Corsini, Marotta and Cesenatico. The bombardment damaged the railway tracks between Senigallia and Rimini and destroyed one locomotive and several wagons, but when the flotilla moved to attack two small steamers, an Italian armoured train arrived and engaged them with its 15 cm (6 in) guns, and they broke off. On the return voyage to Pola, the ships were apparently pursued by Italian warships, but the scout cruiser Admiral Spaun sailed to provide support, and the Italians withdrew.

On 24 May 1918, 78, along with her sisters 77 and 97, and the Kaiman-class boats 58 and 59, pursued an unidentified British submarine near the island of Galijola in the mid-Adriatic. By 1918, the Allies had strengthened their ongoing blockade on the Strait of Otranto, as foreseen by the Austro-Hungarian Navy. As a result, it was becoming more difficult for the German and Austro-Hungarian U-boats to get through the strait and into the Mediterranean Sea. In response to these blockades, the new commander of the Austro-Hungarian Navy, Konteradmiral Miklós Horthy, decided to launch an attack on the Allied defenders with battleships, scout cruisers, and destroyers. During the night of 8 June, Horthy left the naval base of Pola in the upper Adriatic with the dreadnought battleships Viribus Unitis and Prinz Eugen. At about 23:00 on 9 June 1918, after some difficulties getting the harbour defence barrage opened, the dreadnoughts Szent István and Tegetthoff, escorted by one destroyer and six torpedo boats, including 78, also departed Pola and set course for Slano, north of Ragusa, to rendezvous with Horthy in preparation for a coordinated attack on the Otranto Barrage. About 03:15 on 10 June, (Note: Sources differ on what the exact time was when the attack took place. Sieche states that the time was 3:15 am when the Szent István was hit, while Sokol claims that the time was 3:30 am.) while returning from an uneventful patrol off the Dalmatian coast, two Royal Italian Navy (Italian: Regia Marina) MAS boats, MAS 15 and MAS 21, spotted the smoke from the Austrian ships. Both boats successfully penetrated the escort screen and split to engage the dreadnoughts individually. MAS 21 attacked Tegetthoff, but her torpedoes missed. Under the command of Luigi Rizzo, MAS 15 fired two torpedoes at 03:25, both of which hit Szent István. Both boats evaded pursuit. The torpedo hits on Szent István were abreast her boiler rooms, which flooded, knocking out power to the pumps. Szent István capsized less than three hours after being torpedoed. This disaster practically ended Austro-Hungarian fleet operations in the Adriatic for the remaining months of the war.

=== Inter-war years ===
78 survived the war intact. In 1920, under the terms of the previous year's Treaty of Saint-Germain-en-Laye by which rump Austria officially ended World War I, she was allocated to the Kingdom of Serbs, Croats and Slovenes (KSCS, later Yugoslavia). Along with three other 250t-class, T-group boats, 76, 77 and 79, and four F-group boats she served with the KSCS Navy (later the Royal Yugoslav Navy, Serbo-Croatian Latin: Kraljevska Mornarica, KM; Краљевска Морнарица). Transferred in March 1921, in KM service, 78 was renamed T3. At the time of her transfer, she and the other 250t-class torpedo boats were the only modern sea-going warships in the Yugoslav fleet. During the French occupation of Cattaro, the original torpedo tubes were destroyed or damaged, and new ones of the same size were ordered from the Strojne Tovarne factory in Ljubljana. In KM service it was intended to replace one or both guns on each boat of the 250t class with a longer Škoda 66 mm L/45 gun, and it is believed that this included the forward gun on T3. She was also fitted with one or two Zbrojovka 15 mm (0.59 in) machine guns. In KM service, the crew increased to 52.

In 1925, exercises were conducted off the Dalmatian coast, involving the majority of the navy. T3 underwent a refit in 1927. In May and June 1929, six of the eight 250t-class torpedo boats – including T3 – accompanied the light cruiser Dalmacija, the submarine tender Hvar and the submarines Hrabri and Nebojša, on a cruise to Malta, the Greek island of Corfu in the Ionian Sea, and Bizerte in the French protectorate of Tunisia. The ships and their crews made a very good impression on the British while visiting Malta. In 1932, the British naval attaché was reporting that Yugoslav ships were engaging in few exercises or manoeuvres due to reduced budgets. By 1939, the maximum speed achieved by the 250t class in Yugoslav service had declined to 24 kn (44 km/h; 28 mph).

=== World War II ===
In April 1941, Yugoslavia entered World War II when it was invaded by the German-led Axis powers. At the time of the invasion, T3 was assigned to the Southern Sector of the KM's Coastal Defence Command based at the Bay of Kotor, along with the rest of the 3rd Torpedo Division, which consisted of the six 250t-class boats remaining in Yugoslav service. Just prior to the invasion, T3, along with her sister ships T5, T6 and T7, was detached to Šibenik, in accordance with plans to attack the Italian enclave of Zara. When the invasion began on 6 April, T3 was anchored in the Sibenik channel between Jadrija and Zablace with three other torpedo boats, but she was not equipped with modern anti-aircraft guns, and so was unable to effectively engage the Italian aircraft flying over Zlarin to attack Sibenik. The torpedo boats were ordered to retreat to Zaton, but T3 was hampered by problems with one of her boilers and was sent to Primosten. The plan to attack Zara was abandoned after messages were received about the proclamation of the Independent State of Croatia (NDH) on 10 April and that Yugoslav forces were retreating on all fronts. In response to the proclamation, the crew of T3 mutinied and sailed to either Split or nearby Divulje to join the fledgling Navy of the Independent State of Croatia, but was soon seized by the Italians. T3 was operated by the Royal Italian Navy under her Yugoslav designation. She was fitted with two 76 mm (3 in) L/30 anti-aircraft guns in place of her 66 mm guns, along with a single Breda 20 mm (0.79 in) L/65 anti-aircraft gun. Her bridge was enclosed, but no other significant alterations were made to her. Her plain hull was also painted in a dazzle camouflage pattern. Due to her obsolescence, the Italians only used T3 as a guard ship, and for coastal and second-line duties against the Yugoslav Partisans. While in Italian service, her crew grew to 64.

When the Italians capitulated, the German Navy (German: Kriegsmarine) seized T3 – which was undergoing repairs in the port of Rijeka – on 16 September 1943, and renamed her TA48. After a partial reconstruction and re-armament, she was transferred to the NDH navy at Trieste on 15 August 1944, but remained subordinated to the 2nd Escort Flotilla of the German 11th Security Division. The Germans removed her torpedo tubes and fitted her for anti-aircraft defence, with twin 37 mm (1.5 in) SK C/30 guns mounted forward, one quad 20 mm (0.79 in) Flakvierling 38 gun mounted where the aft torpedo tubes had been, one twin Breda 20 mm gun mounted aft, and two single Breda 20 mm guns mounted where her forward torpedo tubes had been. Sources vary on whether she was used operationally. Michael J. Whitley and Vincent P. O'Hara state that she was used for patrol and escort work in the northern Adriatic, while Zvonimir Freivogel asserts that she was never operational due to lack of spares, available workforce, and age. Her crew while under German control amounted to 35 men.

The Partisans in the Rijeka area placed considerable and ongoing pressure on T3's commanding officer to defect with his boat to them, but he refused because of the ongoing mechanical problems with the vessel. The boat was transferred back to Rijeka, and was moored there on 4 December when the NDH motor torpedo boat KS 5 defected to the Partisans, and other defecting boats were stopped by the harbour boom. Almost Croatian naval personnel were brought ashore and their commanding officers were brought before a military tribunal but eventually acquitted. Regardless of this result, the NDH navy was dissolved and its personnel were mostly employed thereafter in ground units. Some Croatian naval personnel did remain aboard T3 and she was transferred back to Trieste. She was sunk there by Allied aircraft on 20 February 1945. (Note: Sources conflict on who sank TA48. Gardiner and Lenton state that they were Allied aircraft without specifying their nationality, while Chesneau states they were British aircraft, and Wilmott states that US aircraft carried out the attack.) The wreck was raised on 10 May 1946 and scrapped in 1948–1949.
