= Đenovići =

Village in Herceg Novi, Montenegro

Đenovići Ђеновићи
- Village
- Location within Montenegro
- Coordinates: 42°26′13″N 18°36′07″E
- Country: Montenegro
- Region: Coastal
- Municipality: Herceg Novi
- Elevation: 0 m (0 ft)

Population (2011)
  - Total: 1,161
- Time zone: UTC+1 (CET)
  - Summer (DST): UTC+2 (CEST)
- Postal code: 85345
- Area code: +382 31
- Vehicle registration: HN

Ðenovići (Montenegrin: Ђеновићи) is a village in the municipality of Herceg Novi, Montenegro.

== Demographics ==
According to the 2011 census, the village has a population of 1,161 people.

Population of Đenovići
Year	Pop.	±%
1948	488	—
1953	689	+41.2%
1961	649	−5.8%
1971	553	−14.8%
1981	774	+40.0%
1991	887	+14.6%
2003	1,272	+43.4%
2011	1,161	−8.7%

Ethnicity in 2011
Ethnicity	Number	Percentage
Montenegrins	496	42.72%
Serbs	472	40.65%
Regional	24	2.06%
Romani	18	1.55%
Croats	16	1.37%
Macedonians	7	0.6%
Russians	7	0.6%
Others	32	2.75%
Undeclared	89	7.66%
Total	1,161	100%

2003 census

Ethnicity in 2003
Ethnicity	Number	Percentage
Serbs	573	45.04%
Montenegrins	437	34.35%
Croats	17	1.33%
Romani	8	0.62%
Yugoslavs	8	0.62%
ethnic Muslims	7	0.55%
Slovenes	3	0.23%
Macedonians	3	0.23%
Egyptians	2	0.15%
Bosniaks	1	0.07%
Others	11	0.86%
Total	1,864	100%

== Notable people ==
- Vjenceslav Čižek, poet
