= Deaths in May 1988 =

The following is a list of notable deaths in May 1988.

Entries for each day are listed alphabetically by surname. A typical entry lists information in the following sequence:

- Name, age, country of citizenship at birth, subsequent country of citizenship (if applicable), reason for notability, cause of death (if known), and reference.

== May 1988 ==
=== 1 ===
- Joseph F. Ambrose, 91, American World War I veteran
- Bill Amor, 68, English Olympic footballer (1948).
- Claude Demetrius, 71, American songwriter ("Hard Headed Woman").
- Ben Lexcen, 52, Australian yachtsman and marine architect, designed winged keel which won America's Cup, heart attack.
- Tom Pappas, 46, American aide to US Representative Roy Dyson, suicide after allegations of homosexuality with Dyson.
- Paolo Stoppa, 81, Italian actor, leukemia.
- Raoul Thiercelin, 90, French Olympic rugby union player (1920).
- Yan Wenliang, 94, Chinese painter.

=== 2 ===
- John Weir Foote, 83, Canadian military chaplain and politician (Legislative Assembly of Ontario).
- Art Hefner, 74, American Negro League baseball player.
- Pavel Kadochnikov, 72, Soviet actor, film director and screenwriter.
- Sorabji Mehta, 83-84, Indian cricketer.
- Henry Picker, 76, German lawyer and author, published transcripts of Adolf Hitler's informal talks (Table Talk).

=== 3 ===
- Jackson Miles Abbott, 68, American officer in the U.S. Army Corps of Engineers, environmentalist, cancer.
- Carl Erhardt, 91, English international ice hockey player and Olympic gold medalist (1936).
- Julia Butler Hansen, 80, American politician, member of U.S. House of Representatives (1960-1974).
- José María Jáuregui, 92, Spanish Olympic footballer (1928).
- Lim Keng Peng, 35, Singaporean murderer, killed in police ambush.
- Boy Louw, 82, South African rugby union player (Western Province, South Africa).
- Premendra Mitra, 83, Indian poet, writer and film director.
- Lev Pontryagin, 79, Soviet mathematician (Pontryagin duality, Pontryagin cohomology operation).
- Abraham Seidenberg, 71, American mathematician (Tarski–Seidenberg theorem).
- Bill Speidel, 76, American newspaper columnist (The Seattle Times).
- Paul Vario, 73, American mobster from the Lucchese crime family, respiratory arrest.

=== 4 ===
- Ed Bakey, 62, American film and television actor.
- Stanley William Hayter, 86, English painter (Atelier 17 studio), cardiac arrest.
- Carl Jensen, 67, American politician, member of the Minnesota Senate and House of Representatives, cancer.
- Jan Mazurkiewicz, 91, Polish army general and politician.
- Oleg Zhakov, 83, Soviet film actor.

=== 5 ===
- Billo Frómeta, 72, Dominican orchestra conductor and composer, stroke.
- Ernie Hammond, 77, Australian rules footballer.
- Harold Hull, 67, American basketball player.
- D.D. Kashyap, 77–78, Indian film director.
- Katharine DuPre Lumpkin, 90, American writer The Making of a Southerner.
- Hamid Mirza, 70, Iranian heir presumptive of former ruling dynasty of Iran, son of last Qajar Crown Prince of Iran.
- George Rose, 68, English actor and singer (My Fair Lady, The Mystery of Edwin Drood, The Pirates of Penzance), murdered.
- Michael Shaara, 59, American author (The Killer Angels), heart attack.
- R. J. Unstead, 72, British historian and author, heart failure.

=== 6 ===
- Joep Brandes, 67, Dutch footballer.
- Richard Caliguiri, 56, American politician, mayor of Pittsburgh, amyloidosis.
- Weldon Edwards, 64, American NFL player (Washington Redskins).
- Herbert L. Hart, 91, American college football and basketball player and coach.
- Caleb Rodney Layton III, 80, American district judge (United States District Court for the District of Delaware).
- Costantino Nivola, 76, Italian-born American sculptor, heart attack.
- Hans Popper, 84, Austrian-born American pathologist and hepatologist, pancreatic cancer.

=== 7 ===
- Nara Nath Acharya, 82, Nepalese Pandit and writer (biography of Bhanubhakta Acharya).
- Fernand Donna, 66, French Olympic sprint canoeist (1948).
- Auguste Maltais, 72, Canadian politician, member of the House of Commons of Canada (1949-1958).

=== 8 ===
- Robert A. Heinlein, 80, American science fiction author (Stranger in a Strange Land, The Moon Is a Harsh Mistress), emphysema and heart failure.
- Nappy Lamare, 82, American jazz banjoist, guitarist and vocalist.
- Domingo Ortega, 82, Spanish matador.
- Charles Pollock, 85, American abstract painter, brother of artist Jackson Pollock, stroke.
- Ruby M. Rouss, 66, American member of the US Army Women's Army Corps and politician, president of the Virgin Islands Legislature, diabetes.
- Abdel Moneim Wahby, 76, Egyptian Olympic basketball player (1936).

=== 9 ===
- Alfons Julen, 89, Swiss Olympic cross-country skier (1924, 1928).
- Willie Moir, 66, Scottish international footballer (Bolton Wanderers).

=== 10 ===
- Wendell Bill, 78, Australian cricketer.
- Ciarán Bourke, 53, Irish musician (The Dubliners).
- Hugh Laing, 76, Barbados-born American ballet dancer, cancer.
- Ion Neacșu, 57, Romanian footballer.
- Richard B. Ogilvie, 65, American attorney and law enforcement officer, Governor of Illinois, heart attack.
- John Sterling Rockefeller, 83, American philanthropist, conservationist, and amateur ornithologist.
- Shen Congwen, 85, Chinese writer, heart attack.

=== 11 ===
- Domenico Cambieri, 73, Italian Olympic rower (1948, 1952).
- Isabella Gordon, 86, Scottish marine biologist (crabs, sea spiders).
- George Gordon-Lennox, 79, British army general in World War II.
- Wilhelm Emil Mühlmann, 83, German ethnologist.
- Kim Philby, 76, British intelligence officer and spy (Cambridge Five), heart failure.
- Edmund Sobkowiak, 74, Polish Olympic boxer (1936).

=== 12 ===
- César Gallardo, 92, Uruguayan Olympic fencer (1948).
- Jaime Giralt, 86, Spanish Olympic rower (1924).
- Jacquelyn Kelley, 61, American AAGPBL player.
- Paul Osborn, 86, American playwright and screenwriter (On Borrowed Time, Morning's at Seven).
- Chick Parsons, 86, American diplomat and decorated World War II veteran.
- Hank Schenz, 69, American MLB player (Chicago Cubs, Pittsburgh Pirates, New York Giants).

=== 13 ===
- Chet Baker, 58, American jazz trumpeter and vocalist (It Could Happen to You), fall from building.
- John Garrison, 79, American Olympic ice hockey player (1932, 1936).
- Paul Genge, 74, American actor (Bullitt).
- Sergey Gorshkov, 78, Soviet Admiral of the Fleet.
- Friedrich Guggenberger, 73, Nazi German admiral and U-boat commander.
- Caecilia Loots, 84, Dutch resistance member known for saving Jewish children during World War II.
- Nikolay Makarov, 73, Soviet firearms designer (Makarov pistol).
- Irene Manton, 84, British botanist (ferns and algae), Professor of Botany at the University of Leeds.
- Sir Watkin Williams-Wynn, 83, Welsh soldier and landowner.

=== 14 ===
- Prince Aschwin of Lippe-Biesterfeld, 73, German-born curator at the Metropolitan Museum of Art.
- Fred Atkins, 77–78, New Zealand-born Canadian professional wrestler (Maple Leaf Wrestling).
- Willem Drees, 101, Dutch politician and historian, Prime Minister of the Netherlands.
- Ernesto Giménez Caballero, 88, Spanish writer, diplomat and pioneer of Fascism, founder of La Gaceta Literaria.
- Wayne Jarratt, 31, Australian actor (Prisoner), brain tumour.
- Schute Merritt, 77, American Negro Leagues baseball player.

=== 15 ===
- Andrew Duggan, 64, American actor (Seven Days in May), throat cancer.
- Fulvia Franco, 56, Italian actress and model (Miss Italia).
- Lois Maloy, 85, American illustrator of children's books.
- Greta Nissen, 82, Norwegian-American film and stage actress, Parkinson's disease.
- Sol Polk, 71, American businessman, co-founder of Polk Brothers.
- P. R. Shyamsunder, 64, Indian cricketer.
- Thomas E. Stephens, 84, Irish-American politician.
- Heikki Taskinen, 82, Finnish Olympic discus thrower (1928).

=== 16 ===
- Kay Baxter, 42, American bodybuilder, car crash.
- Gordon Garlick, 71, English cricketer.
- Chan Htoon, 82, Attorney General and Associate Justice of the Supreme Court of Burma.
- Charles Keeping, 63, English illustrator (The Highwayman) and children's book author, brain tumour.
- Jules Levin, 66, American politician.
- Anatoli Maslyonkin, 57, Soviet international footballer (Spartak Moscow, USSR) and Olympic gold medalist (1956).
- Joe Matte, 80, Canadian NHL player (Detroit Cougars, Chicago Black Hawks).
- Torahiko Miyahata, 85, Japanese Olympic swimmer (1924).
- Peter J. Ortiz, 74, United States Marine Corps colonel, cancer.
- Bruce Watson, 78, Scottish organic chemist and politician, leader of the Scottish National Party.
- Sidney Wewege, 80, South African cricketer.

=== 17 ===
- Wesley Frensdorff, 61, American Episcopal prelate, bishop of Nevada (1972–1985), plane crash.
- Frank Gallop, 87, American radio and television personality.
- Elio Gerussi, 52, Italian racing cyclist.
- Guy Glover, 77, Canadian producer (National Film Board of Canada).
- Al Wiseman, 69, American cartoonist (Dennis the Menace).

=== 18 ===
- Daws Butler, 71, American voice actor (Yogi Bear, Huckleberry Hound, Snagglepuss), heart attack.
- Drew Ellis, 73, American NFL player (Philadelphia Eagles).
- Anthony Forwood, 72, English actor (Knights of the Round Table), liver cancer and Parkinson's disease.
- Christopher Gore, 43, American screenwriter and playwright (Fame), AIDS.
- Daniel Lewis James, 77, American writer (Famous All Over Town), heart attack.
- R. B. Nunnery, 54, American AFL player (Dallas Texans).
- Brandon Rhys-Williams, 60, British politician, Member of Parliament, pneumonia.
- Armand Savoie, 58, Canadian Olympic boxer (1948).
- Michiko Tanaka, 78, Japanese singer and actress.
- Enzo Tortora, 59, Italian television presenter and politician, member of European Parliament, cancer.

=== 19 ===
- Kurt-Caesar Hoffmann, 92 Nazi German navy vice admiral (Scharnhorst).
- Dave McCleave, 76, British Olympic boxer (1932).
- Lloyd Vaughan, 79, American animator (Warner Bros.).

=== 20 ===
- Ana Aslan, 91, Romanian biologist and physician, specialist in gerontology.
- Nick Corwin, 8, American murder victim.
- Bjørn Gulbrandsen, 61, Norwegian Olympic ice hockey player (1952).
- Paddy Harold, 65, Irish Olympic rower (1948).
- Dick Jacobs, 70, American musician, arranger and orchestrator.
- František Kiehlmann, 86, Czech Olympic hurdler (1920).
- Anthony C. Perera, 66, Sri Lankan actor.
- Marion G. Romney, 90, American Mormon leader.
- Victorio Unamuno, 78, Spanish footballer (Real Betis).

=== 21 ===
- Harry Babasin, 67, American jazz bassist, emphysema.
- Richard J. Daronco, 56, American lawyer and judge, assassinated.
- Sammy Davis Sr., 87, American dancer (Will Mastin Trio), father of Sammy Davis Jr.
- John D. Fitzgerald, 82, American author (The Great Brain).
- Bruno Frei, 90, Austrian political writer and journalist.
- Dino Grandi, 92, Italian Fascist politician, ambassador to the U.K.
- Clement Hill, 83, Australian cricketer.
- Barbara Laage, 67, French film actress.
- Pino Romualdi, 74, Italian right-wing politician, Member of the European Parliament, cancer.
- Zano West, 71, American basketball player.

=== 22 ===
- Giorgio Almirante, 73, Italian politician, founder and leader of neo-fascist Italian Social Movement, stroke.
- W. H. Canaway, 62, British author.
- Lionel Edirisinghe, 75, Sri Lankan musicologist, principal at the University of the Visual and Performing Arts.
- Edgar Johnston, 92, Australian WWI flying ace.

=== 23 ===
- Aya Kitō, 25, Japanese diarist, spinocerebellar ataxia.
- Carl Littlefield, 71, American NFL player (Cleveland Rams, Pittsburgh Pirates).
- Emanuel Paul, 84, American jazz tenor saxophonist.
- David Schoenbrun, 73, American broadcast journalist (CBS), heart attack.
- Roberto Succo, 26, Italian serial killer, suicide.
- Tony Viramontes, 31, American artist, AIDS.

=== 24 ===
- Tom Adair, 74, American songwriter and composer ("Let's Get Away from It All", "There's No You").
- Tom Burtt, 73, New Zealand cricketer.
- Freddie Frith, 79, British Grand Prix motorcycle road racing world champion.
- Jamie Hamilton, 87, British rower and Olympic medalist (1928), publisher (Hamish Hamilton).
- Bill Horton, 41, Canadian ice hockey player.
- Ernest Labrousse, 93, French historian.
- Aleksei Losev, 94, Soviet philosopher.
- Galiano Pividori, 72, Italian racing cyclist.
- Leo Schamroth, 63, South African cardiologist.

=== 25 ===
- Monte Kay, 63, American record producer, heart failure.
- Ruth Malcomson, 82, Miss America 1924.
- Charlie Perkins, 82, American MLB player (Philadelphia Athletics, Brooklyn Dodgers).
- Leon Shimkin, 81, American businessman (Simon & Schuster).
- Martin Slavin, 66, British composer for movies and television (Information Received, The Cool Mikado), road accident.
- Bill Steinmetz, 89, American Olympic speed skater (1924).
- Karl August Wittfogel, 91, German-American playwright and historian, pneumonia.

=== 26 ===
- Antonio Bardellino, 43, Italian mobster, boss of the Casalesi clan, assumed murdered.
- Jules Gales, 63, Luxembourgian Olympic footballer (1948, 1952).
- Robert Graf, 81, American Olympic canoeist (1936).
- Juan Orol, 90, Spanish-born Mexican actor and director (Gangsters Versus Cowboys, Sandra, la mujer de fuego), liver disease.
- Frederick Parker, 75, English cricketer and British Army officer.
- Dick Strahs, 64, American MLB player (Chicago White Sox).
- Nicolò Vittori, 79, Italian Olympic rower (1928, 1936).

=== 27 ===
- Bill Bollinger, 48, American sculptor.
- Carlos Choque, 75, Argentine Olympic sports shooter (1952).
- John DiGilio, 55, American mobster with the Genovese crime family, murdered.
- Paul Lafond, 68, Canadian politician, member of the Senate of Canada (1970-1988).
- Florida Friebus, 78, American writer and actress (The Many Loves of Dobie Gillis, The Bob Newhart Show).
- James O'Brien, 62, Canadian Olympic sprinter (1948).
- Hjördis Petterson, 79, Swedish actress.
- Ernst Ruska, 81, German physicist, Nobel laureate in Physics (electron optics).
- Lars Sæter, 93, Norwegian politician.
- Ralph Townsend, 66, American Olympic cross-country skier (1948).

=== 28 ===
- Adolfo Contoli, 90, Italian Olympic athlete (1924).
- Felix Morrow, 81, American communist political activist and newspaper editor.
- Sy Oliver, 77, American jazz trumpeter, singer and bandleader.
- Evelyn Page, 89, New Zealand artist.
- Charlie Sevior, 80, Australian rules footballer.
- Norman Skelhorn, 78, English barrister, Director of Public Prosecutions for England and Wales.
- Dodë Tahiri, 69, Albanian footballer.
- Bjarne Undheim, 83, Norwegian educator and politician.
- Alfredo Volpi, 92, Brazilian painter.

=== 29 ===
- Charla Doherty, 41, American actress (Days of Our Lives).
- Sheridan Dufferin, 49, British patron of the arts, AIDS.
- Henry Johansen, 83, Norwegian international footballer and Olympic medalist (Vålerenga, Norway).
- Salem bin Laden, 42, Saudi Arabian investor and businessman, half brother of Osama bin Laden, plane crash.
- Vladimír Menšík, 59, Czech actor and entertainer, asthma.
- Siaka Stevens, 82, Sierra Leone politician, Prime Minister and President of Sierra Leone.
- Roy Williams, 59, Australian rules footballer.
- Elaine Black Yoneda, 81, American labour and civil rights activist, member of Communist Party, heart attack.

=== 30 ===
- Hans Bryner, 77, Swiss Olympic sailor (1948, 1952, 1960, 1964).
- Iseline Crivelli, 85, Italian Olympic alpine skier (1936).
- Curtis Hollingsworth, 71, American Negro League baseball player (Birmingham Black Barons).
- Miroslav Nový, 57, Czech Olympic ice hockey player (1952).
- Ella Raines, 67, American actress (Phantom Lady, Brute Force), throat cancer.
- Peter Timmis, 45, English cricketer.

=== 31 ===
- June Buchanan, 100, American founder of Alice Lloyd College.
- Murray Gainger, 48, Australian rules footballer.
- Jimmy Hartnett, 61, Irish footballer (Middlesbrough).
- Dwarka Prasad Mishra, 86, Indian politician, writer and journalist, Chief Minister of Madhya Pradesh.
- Arthur Olliver, 71, Australian rules footballer.
- Tursun Uljabayev, 72, First Secretary of the Communist Party of Tajikistan.

=== Unknown date ===
- Rosa Collazo, 83–84, Puerto Rican political activist (Nationalist Party of Puerto Rico), plotted to kill U.S. president Harry Truman.
