= František Rasch =

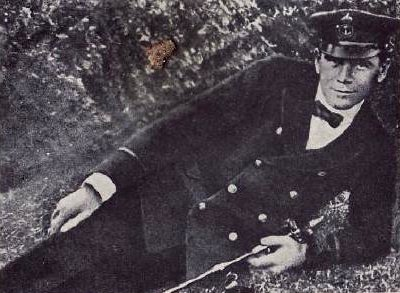
František Rasch

František Rasch (Note: Spelling of his name according to the register of births and baptisms; scan available at: .) also Franz Rasch or František Raš (9 December 1889 – 11 February 1918) was a Czech-German sailor and revolutionary. He was an important leader of the Cattaro mutiny in February 1918.

== Early life and education ==
Rasch was born on 9 December 1889 in Přerov in Moravia, Austria-Hungary. His father Adolf Rasch was German and a tailor by profession. The mother Kateřina Raschová, née Petříková was Czech. They had eight children, František was the fourth. When he was six years old, the family moved to Opava (Troppau), also in Moravia, where the father got a job as a postal worker.

The head of the Municipal Archives in Přerov, Jiří Lapáček assumes that František most probably attended five classes of the German municipal school and later three classes of the citizen school until 1903. After that he attended the commercial school and was trained as a trading assistant in a hardware shop in Opava / Troppau. As soon as he finished his apprenticeship in 1905, he went to Šibenik and enrolled in the local school for ship's boys. The military school lasted two years. After that he did his military service. Rasch spent the years 1905 to 1913 at sea or various naval bases.

== Cattaro mutiny ==
When war broke out in 1914, Rasch was drafted into the Austro-Hungarian Navy as a reservist. At the beginning of 1918 he was stationed as Titularbootsmann (senior NCO) at the lighting department in Kumbor (located at the middle bay of Cattaro).

It is not quite clear how intensively Rasch was involved in the preparations for the Cattaro mutiny. Bruno Frei and Jindřich Veselý describe various loose groups organising to protest against what they perceived as a catastrophic situation. To this end they wanted to join the vast January strike wave in Austria-Hungary and give it further impetus. Rasch too apparently belonged to these groups. He is described by Veselý as genius/brilliant and a conscious social democrat. (Note: Bruno Frei (see under Literature, p. 42) makes similar comments. However, neither of them cites any verifiable sources. One can only assume that they are based on interviews with contemporary witnesses. Bruno Frei names Ujdur and Veselý lists several people in the appendix whom he has interviewed.) However, he did not appear in public until the second day of the uprising, when he became the most important spokesman for the central sailors' committee on the flagship (Austrian: Flaggenschiff) SMS Sankt Georg, the centre of the uprising. Plaschka sees in Rasch the determining element of the revolt, who also clearly addressed the social-revolutionary perspective: "that the system in the state must be overthrown."

== Sentence and execution ==
The uprising had to be abandoned already on the third day, because the wave of strikes in Austria-Hungary had come to a standstill shortly before, because there was no major support from the population and the forces stationed on land, and because the military leadership had succeeded in bringing forward loyal forces. As a result, 678 naval personnel were arrested, including Rasch. Of these, 40 were brought before a summary court, four of whom, including Rasch, were sentenced to execution by firing squad on 10 February 1918. A plea for clemency of the civil lawyer Dr. Mitrović to the emperor, which he justified among other things by an unfair trial, remained unanswered. The execution took place early in the morning on 11 February 1918, below the cemetery walls of the nearby village Škaljari. They were buried in a common grave.

About the last hours of the condemned there is a report of the Croatian Feldkurat (field curate, Austrian for military chaplain) Don Niko Luković, written down by the writer and historian Niko Simov Martinovic. Plaschka summarized this report. The sentence was announced to the prisoners at 5:00 a.m. While Grabar, Sisgorić and Berničevič winced, Rasch remained calm and answered: "Gentlemen, in my opinion this is a judicial murder." Thereupon the priest spoke with the condemned. Rasch explained that as a socialist he had fought for freedom, for workers' rights and for a better social order. And he had fought in the military against this unjust war of conquest, encouraged by the events in Russia. There would be a new sun, which would shine not only on the Slavs, but on all peoples of the world, bringing them peace and justice. Don Luković began to comfort the condemned sailors by admitting that they went innocently into another world as victims of a just cause. Then they were led to the place of execution. No one was allowed to show up on the street or even at the windows. The sentence was read out again. A Hungarian captain was in command of the firing squad. Rasch did not want a blindfold, Grabar asked for pity, as he had a wife and a child. Rasch shouted, "This is a judicial murder!" and "Long live freedom!" The captain drew his saber and gave the command. He had to give it three times. Twice the squad had disobeyed. One had collapsed unconscious. Then a volley cracked. All but Grabar were killed instantly. The captain sent two soldiers ahead, who had to shoot him down.

== Commemoration ==
In Škaljari there is a memorial stone and in Kotor there are two plaques on the former court building and on the prison, on which the names of those shot are included. In Rasch's home town of Přerov, a street and a square with a park were named after him. There, near the Faculty of Education, his bust was also erected together with an information board.

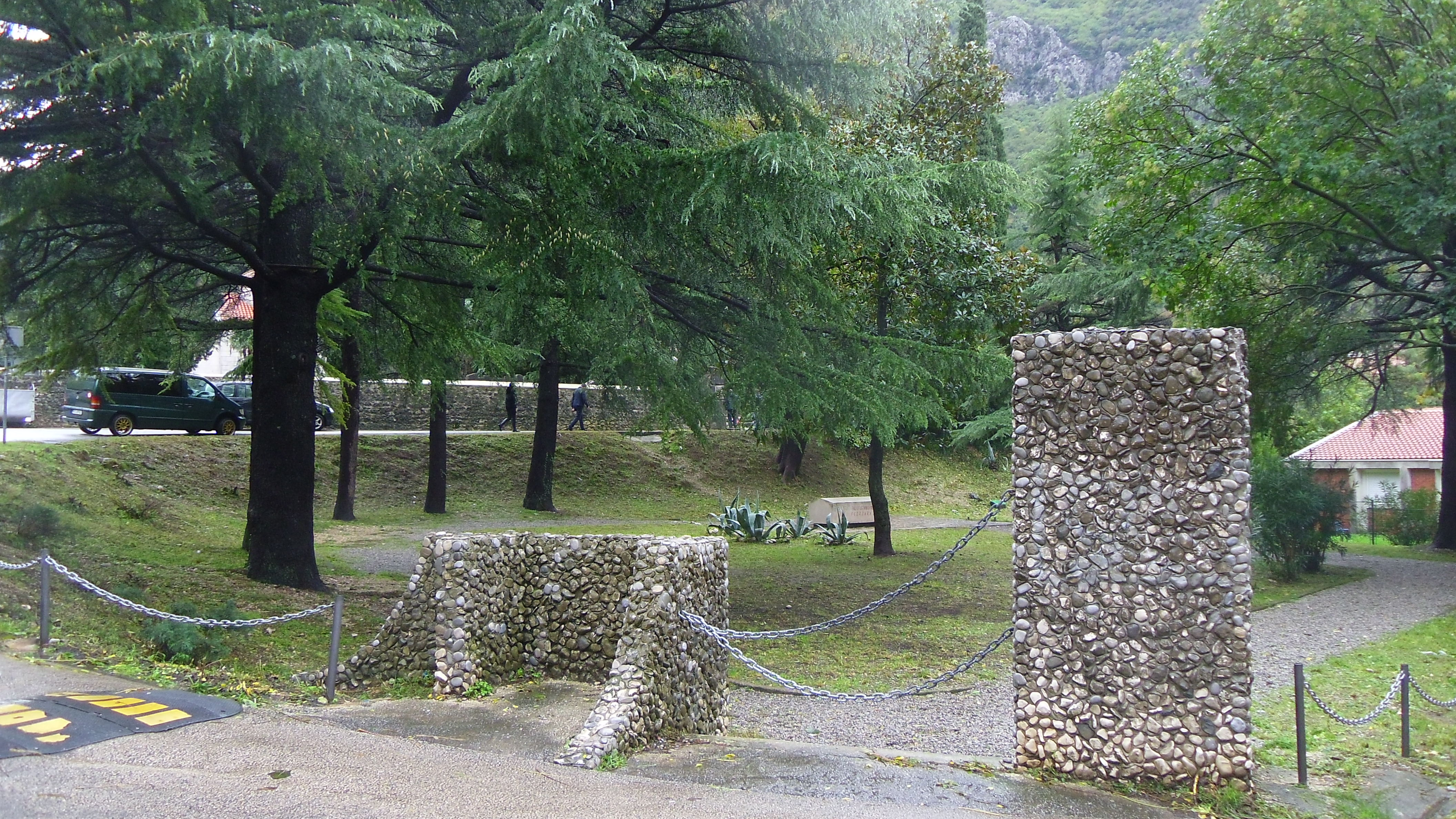
Memorial in front of the Škaljari cemetery, about 15 minutes walking distance from Kotor (Cattaro). At this place, below the cemetery wall, the four sailors were executed.

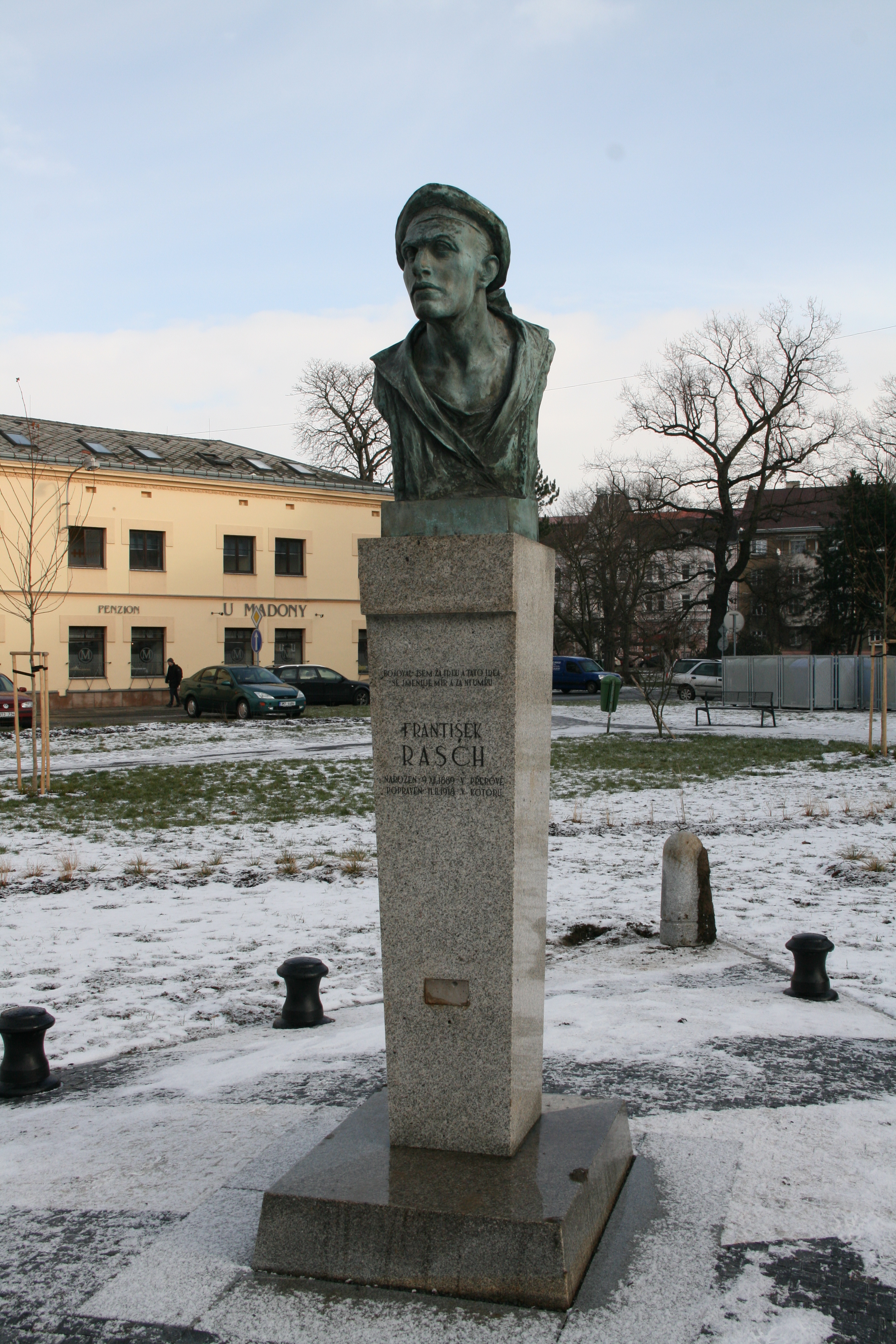
Bust of František Rasch in Přerov

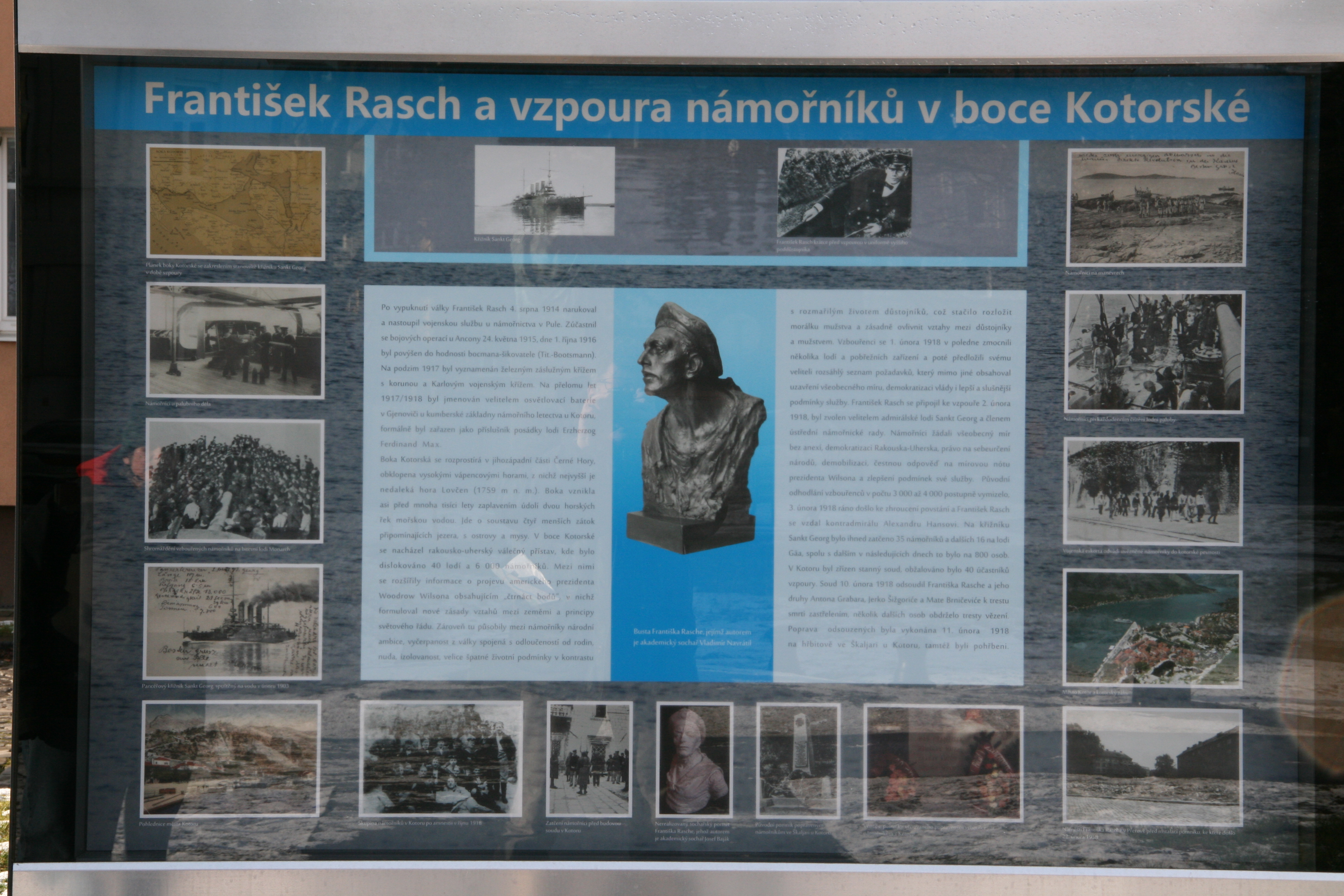
Information board in Přerov; Header: Rasch and the sailors' uprising in the bay of Kotor

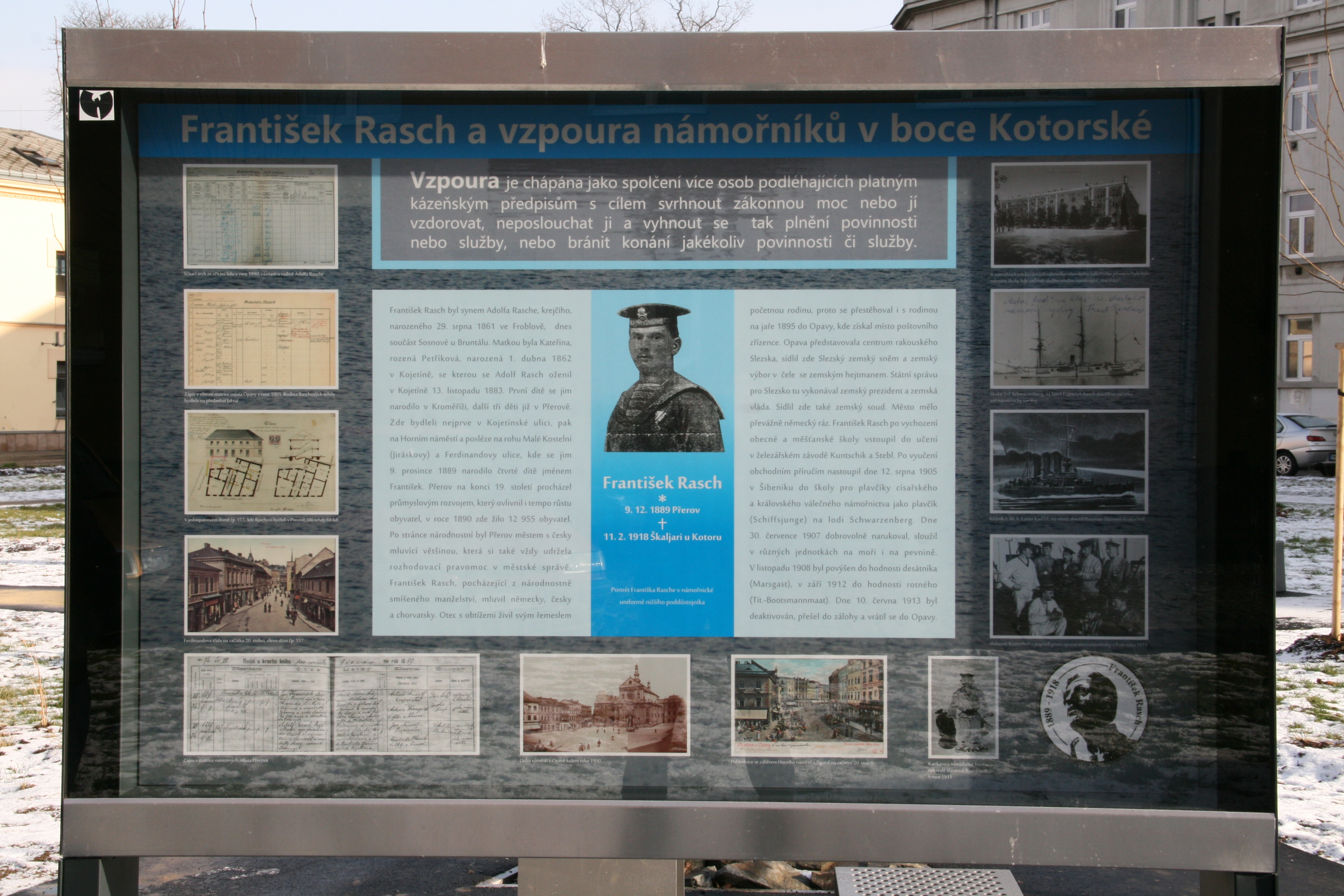
Back of the information board

== Literature ==
- Peter Fitl: Meuterei und Standgericht. Die Matrosenrevolte im Kriegshafen Cattaro vom Februar 1918 und ihr kriegsgerichtliches Nachspiel. Wien 2018.
- Bruno Frei: Die Matrosen von Cattaro. Eine Episode aus dem Revolutionsjahr 1918. New edition Berlin 1963.
- René Greger: Marinemeuterei in Cattaro und Franz Rasch. In: Marine Rundschau Bd. 85 Nr. 6 (Nov./Dez. 1988), S. 351–356.
- Richard G. Plaschka: Cattaro – Prag. Revolte und Revolution. Kriegsmarine und Heer Österreich-Ungarns im Feuer der Aufstandsbewegungen vom 1. Februar und 28. Oktober 1918. Graz 1963.
- Richard, G. Plaschka/Horst Haselsteiner/Arnold Suppan: Innere Front. Militärassistenz, Widerstand und Umsturz in der Donaumonarchie 1918. Bd. 1: Zwischen Streik und Meuterei. Vienna 1974.
- Bernard Stulli: Ustanka mornara u Boki Kotorskoj 1.– 3. februara 1918 (Croatian: Sailors’ uprising in the bay of Kotor 1. – 3. Februar 1918). Split 1959.
- Jindřich Veselý: Povstání v Boce Kotorské. Historická kronika (Czech: Uprising in the bay of Kotor. Historical chronicle). Prague 1958. Available online as pdf-file with a different page numbering at: .
