= Ivan Brkanović =

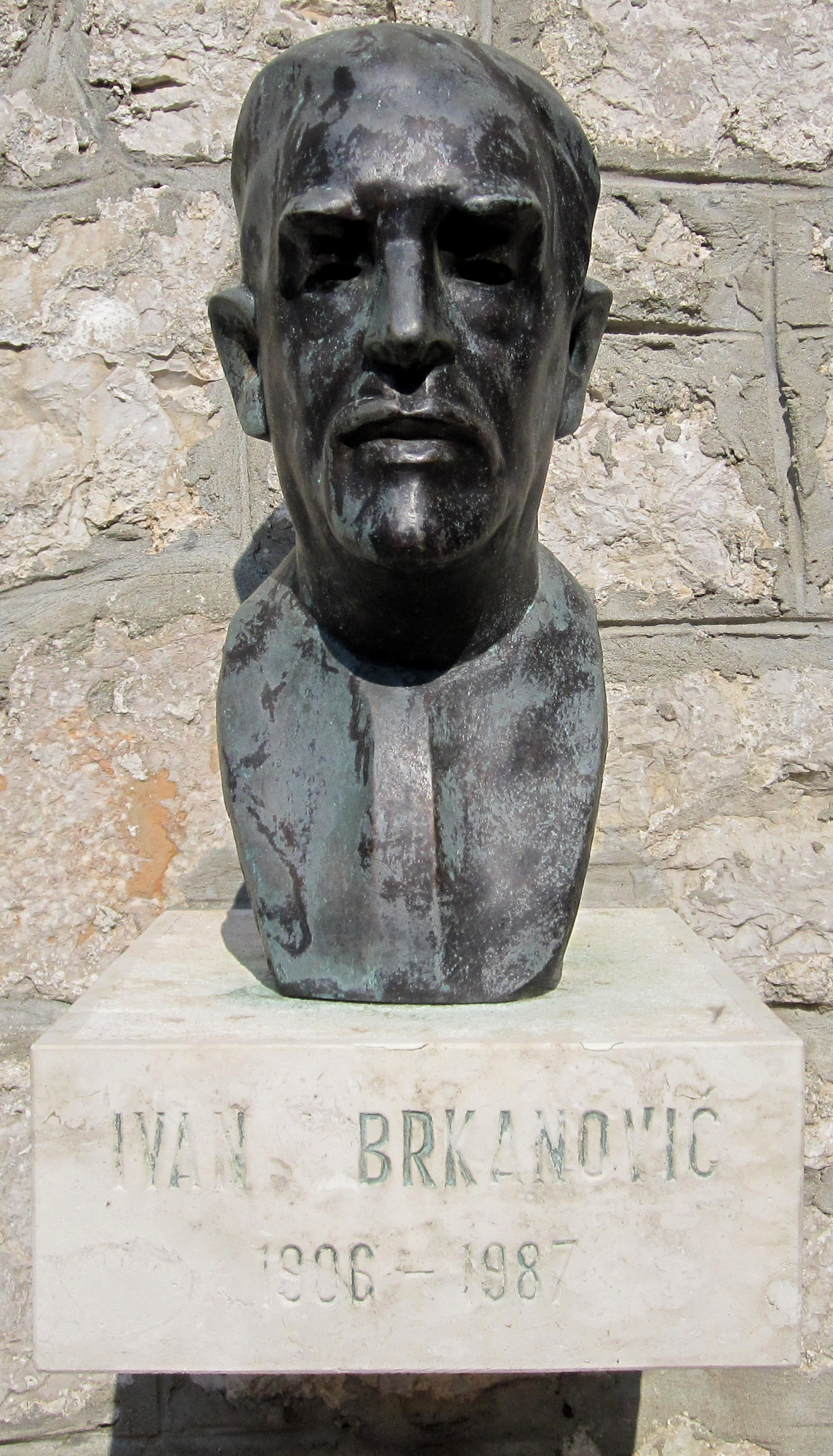
- Born: 27 December 1906; Škaljari, Kingdom of Dalmatia, Austria-Hungary
- Died: 20 February 1987 (aged 80); Zagreb, SR Croatia, SFR Yugoslavia
- Era: 20th century
- Works: http://quercus.mic.hr/quercus/person/215

Ivan Brkanović (27 December 1906 – 20 February 1987) was a Croatian composer. He was a choir conductor, high school teacher, dramaturge at the Zagreb Opera, director of the Zagreb Philharmonic Orchestra and a professor at the Sarajevo Music Academy. He worked intensively as a music publicist and was a president of the Croatian Composers' Society. Father of the Croatian composer Željko Brkanović.

== Biography ==
He was born in Škaljari into Croatian family. In 1927 he came to Zagreb to study music. In his first years in Zagreb he works in a factory and attends a music school. In 1932 he started writing for magazines Evolucija, Hrvatski dnevnik, Sv. Cecilija and Novosti. After that he enrolled to Zagreb Music Academy where he was taught by Blagoje Bersa. Because of Bersa's death he finished Music Academy in the class of Fran Lhotka. After graduation in 1935 he started working as a music teacher in Zagreb's comprehensive school. Later he spent four months on specialization at Schola Cantorum de Paris.

In 1951 he was appointed as a music counselor at Croatian National Theatre in Zagreb and from 1954 as a director of the Zagreb Philharmonic Orchestra. He was a president of Bosnian Composers' Society (1950–1951) and of Croatian Composers' Society (1953–1955). He taught at the Music Academy in Sarajevo. After returning to Zagreb he retires and continues to compose. In 1983 he became a member of Croatian Academy of Sciences and Arts. He died 20 December 1987.

== Oeuvre ==
Brkanović was one of the most prominent representatives of the so-called national style in Croatian music. Using traditional musical means, he blended elements of Croatian folk music with his own strong artistic ideas, and in an attempt to evoke folk art in all its aspects, he drew on traditional rites, particularly on their most primitive features. His musical style is characterized by innovative formal and harmonic procedures, and dense polyphonic textures. Brkanović's feeling for dramatic tension and powerful emotions made him an ideal operatic composer. His first opera, Equinox, is a realistic musical drama, while the opera-oratorio St Simon's Shrine, inspired by scenes from a 14th-century shrine in Zadar, is strongly archaic. Brkanović's best-known work is the Triptych of 1936, a requiem setting of epic folk poetry. This intensely emotional work contrasts restrained choral settings, striking for their Slavonic melodic inflections, with passages of blazing passion and intensity, reinforced by a sharp-edged orchestration. The five symphonies are dramatically conceived; outstanding among them is the traditionally-planned, tragic Second Symphony. Its freely tonal, and sometimes harsh, harmonic structure shows Brkanović's great contrapuntal skill with simple melodic lines, often reminiscent of folksong. The accumulation of motifs and the magnificent handling of the brass are equally noteworthy. Unlike many of his contemporaries, Brkanović has chosen not to investigate new techniques, but has aimed to draw the best from traditional means.

== Selected works ==
- String Quartet No 1 (1933)
- Symphony No 1 (1935)
- Triptych, funeral folk rite for soloists, choir and orchestra (1936)
- String Quartet No 2 (1938.)
- Equinox, music drama in three acts (1944)
- Symphony No 2 (1946)
- Symphony No 3 (1947)
- Symphony No 4 (1948)
- Symphony No 5 (1949)
- O, Croatia – The Figure of my rebellious Country for orchestra (1951)
- Dalmatian Diptych for soloists, choir and symphony orchestra (1953)
- The Chest of Saint Simeon (Zadar's Gold) for mixed choir and orchestra (1954)
- Suite No 1 "Sarajevo" for symphony orchestra (1957)
- Harvest Songs for mixed choir and chamber orchestra (1959)
- Helots, ballet-oratorio in 2 acts with prologue (1960)
- Fedra, musical tragedy in two parts (1975)
- Diggers of Cres, cantata for string quartet, organ and voice (1977)
- Stabat mater dolorosa (The Sorrowful Mother Stood), oratorio (1981)
- String Quartet No 3 (1983)
- Wind Quintet (1984)
- Suite No 2 "Zagreb" for orchestra (1985)
- Missa Profana Croatica for mezzo-soprano, baritone, mixed chorus and orchestra (1986)
- Missa in G (to St Jerome) for mixed choir
- Music for the Film "Electrification"
