= Cattaro mutiny =

Austro-Hungarian Navy mutiny, 1–3 February 1918

The Cattaro mutiny occurred during World War I. Sailors of the Austro-Hungarian Navy in the Adriatic Bay of Cattaro (today: Kotor, Montenegro), which at that time belonged to Austria-Hungary, started it on 1 February 1918. The mutiny remained isolated and had to be abandoned after three days due to the arrival of loyal troops. Four sailors were subsequently executed according to naval law. The naval historian Halpern portrays this event as the last victory of the Austro-Hungarian monarchy over the social forces that would eventually overwhelm it.

== Historical background ==
At the beginning of 1918, dissatisfaction with the food situation, with the political conditions, as well as war fatigue had increased further. After the Russian October Revolution of 1917 and the peace offer of the Bolsheviks, wide circles, especially of the working class, feared that the German Supreme Army Command could jeopardise the hoped-for peace on the Eastern Front by making excessive demands. In protest, the Jännerstreik occurred with over 700,000 participants throughout Austria-Hungary. Workers' councils were formed, which also demanded better supplies, the abolition of censorship, the end of martial law and the introduction of the eight-hour day. The strike wave also reached the naval arsenal in Pola. After the strikes in the Monarchy ended for the most part on 21 January, work was also resumed in Pola on 28 January. Presumably unaware of the end of the actions, the sailors of the warships anchored in Cattaro decided to hold a demonstration, which they hoped would give the movement further impetus.

The base of Cattaro in the south of Austria-Hungary became of special strategic importance when the Lovćen, located on Montenegrin territory and overlooking the bay, was conquered in 1916 during the occupation of Montenegro and Northern Albania. Cattaro now became an important base of operations against the Otranto barrier, a base for the submarine warfare in the Mediterranean, and for supplies to the Balkan front. For this purpose, besides destroyers, torpedo boats and submarines (also German ones), the whole Cruiser Flotilla under the flagship (Austrian: Flaggenschiff) "SMS Sankt Georg" as well as the V. Ship Division was deployed there.

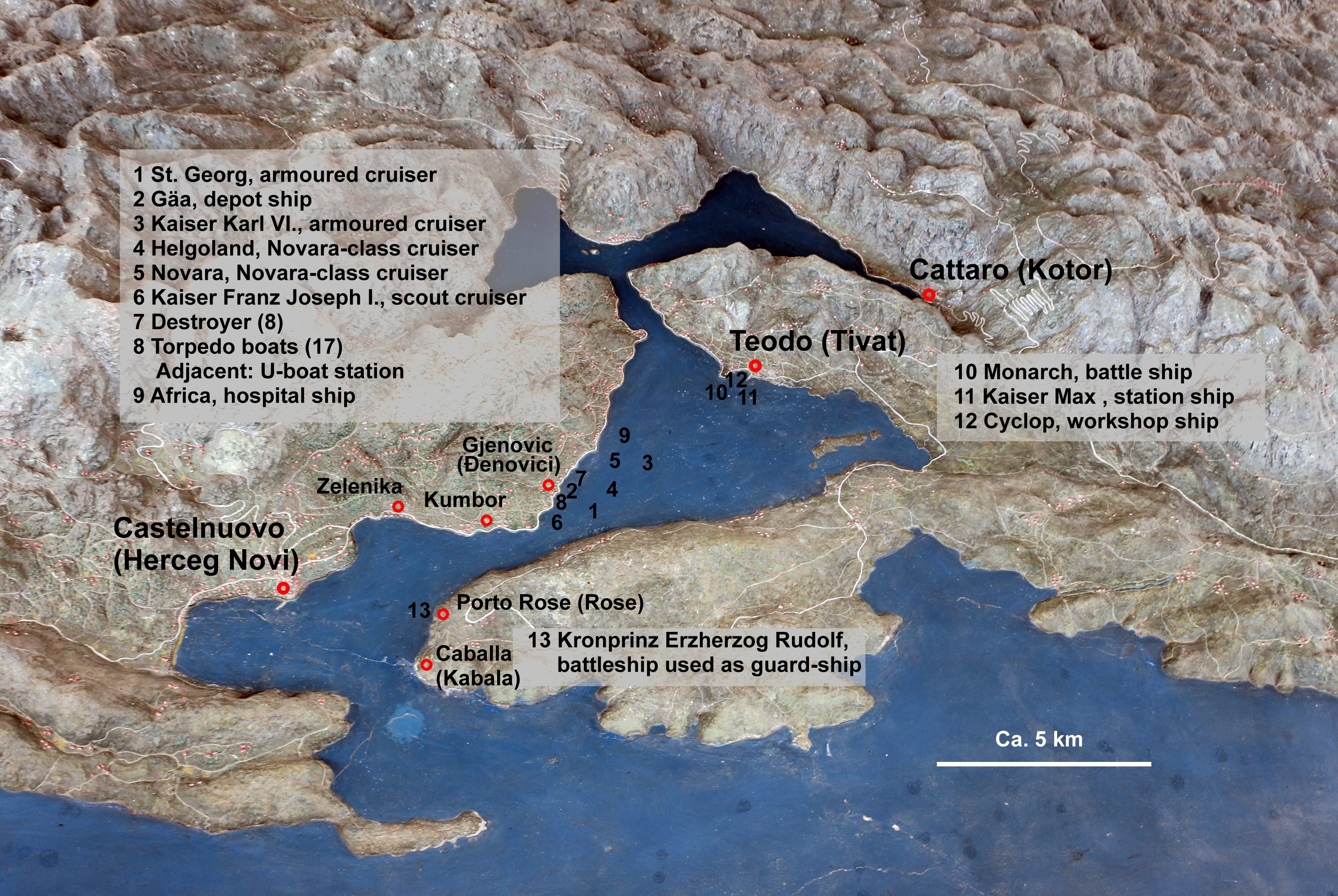
Warships and their positions in Cattaro Bay in February 1918

Destroyers, torpedo boats and submarines as well as the modern Rapidkreuzer (fast cruisers) carried the main load of the naval warfare, while the large ships were mostly idly at anchor, because - as in the German Empire - the risk of the fleet getting destroyed seemed too great (fleet in being). This was also an important reason for increasing tensions between officers and crews aboard these units. The crews felt unjustly and roughly treated by their superiors. They complained about senseless drill, about strict punishment for nullity, about insults, humiliations by often young officers, about the poor rations in contrast to the officers, about torn off uniforms, about the little home leave. Many crew members were trained metalworkers and had come into contact with the ideas of the social democratic workers movement. They demanded democratic reforms. The perceived privileged position of the officers also fed the suspicion that they were not interested in peace, but wanted to prolong the war, while the ordinary soldiers and their families had to suffer great privations.

== Course of events ==
=== The first day of the uprising, 1 February 1918 ===
The uprising, which apparently had been prepared by various loose groups, (Note: Jindřich Veselý mentions in his book Povstání v Boce Kotorské (see under Literature) on p. 34 - unfortunately without any evidence (one can only assume that he based his statement on interviews with contemporary witnesses mentioned in the appendix) - the following persons who would have organised the action: "Nobody asked, but everyone suspected that the warm-blooded Croatian sailors Matulovič, Uidor, Marusič, Sužek, Grabar and Berničevič, as well as the well-known impetuous Italians Baldini, Pachor, Galigari and Scaramuza were very close to the organisers of the rebellion. There was no doubt that they included a number of Czechs: the serious and brilliant František Rasch, the conscious social democrats, the Prague Rudolf Kreibich and Tomas Nitka of "St. Georg", Petr Páral, Viennese Czech from "Gäa", Zahálka from "Monarch", Franta Srbek from "Franz Joseph", Josef Děd from "Karl VI", Šmahel from "Gäa", Bittner from "Novara", Janousek from "Helgoland", Vošmik from "Balaton" and Mývalt from "Orjen" as well as Pribyl and Fr. Malý from the flight station and from the submarine base Ruda Krčmář, Jíša and Valášek and many others. There were also the Polish Gustav Stonawski, a socialist who had organised a hunger strike at the Naval School in Pola as early as 1912 and the airman Grabowiecki." Frei mentions similar names, unfortunately without citing a verifiable source (report by sailor Ujdor) (Frei, Cattaro, p. 42). Plaschka and colleagues, referring to Stulli, describe these statements as problematic. (Plaschka/Haselsteiner/Suppan, Innere Front, p. 117).) started from the flagship "SMS Sankt Georg" on 1 February 1918 at about 12 noon.

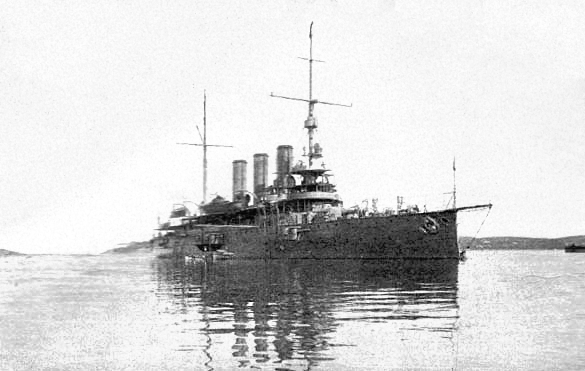
SMS Sankt Georg

The officers had lunch in their mess. The crew armed themselves, fired a cannon shot and raised a red flag. The chief officer (Austrian: Gesamt Detail Offizier) Zipperer, (Note: Egon Zipperer von Arbach held the rank of Korvettenkapitän (lieutenant commander). Sondhaus describes Zipperer wrongly as “Captain” (see under Literature, p. 199) probably giving rise to the claim in some wikipedia articles that Zipperer was the commander of “St. Georg”. The commanding officer was Fregattenkapitän (commander) Huber Edler von Scheibenhain. See Plaschka/Haselsteiner/Suppan, Innere Front, p. 114 ff.) who rushed on deck, received a shot to the temporal bone. Medical assistance was initially prevented before he could be taken to the ship's hospital. In addition, a non-commissioned officer was shot through the chest and a sailor was injured by a ricocheting bullet. There were also shots fired at the ship's commander, but without hitting him. At the request of the crew, the ship's commander brought Rear Admiral Hansa, the commander of the Cruiser Flotilla, on deck. Anton Grabar demanded the immediate end of the war according to the Fourteen Points of Woodrow Wilson and he complained about the bad treatment especially by the young cadets and the insufficient rations. The officers were now ordered to eat the same food as the crew.

Another centre of action was aboard SMS Gäa. Gäa was a depot and workshop ship with a large number of older workers on board, who had come into contact with social democratic ideas more intensively.

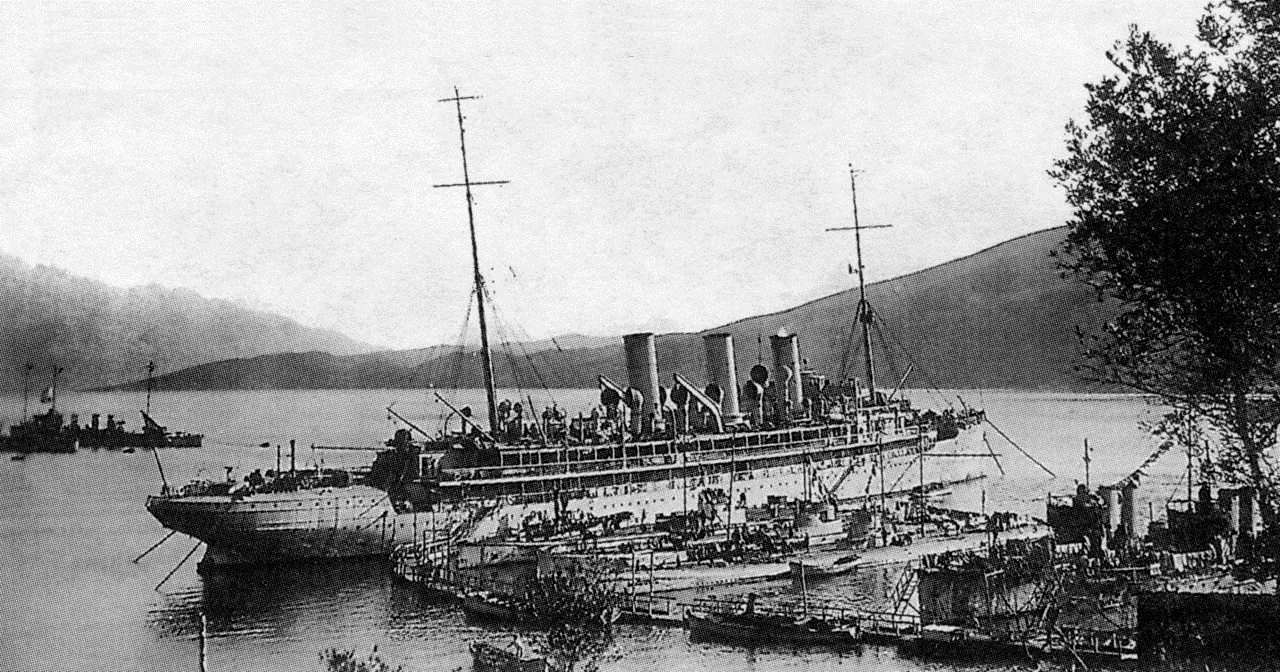
SMS Gäa with torpedoboats and submarines in the middle bay of Cattaro, off Gjenović (Đenovići).

The movement spread quickly. The red flag was hoisted on all larger ships. Only on the ships that were more frequently sent out for warfare, on which therefore the crews were treated much better by the officers, it encountered discomfort (on the fast cruisers) or resistance (on the destroyers, torpedo boats and submarines). Under the threat from the armored cruisers that the ships would be taken under fire, some of the smaller units, partly with the agreement of their commanders, hoisted the red flag.

The destroyer Csepel had earlier received a sailing order for 15 o'clock, to escort a convoy to Durazzo. The commander had the boilers fired up. Thereupon Gäa signalled that in case of leaving the bay fire would be opened. The commander of the Csepel, however, ordered the ship to be cast off and threatened to torpedo the Sankt Georg. The Sankt Georg and the Gäa then fired one cannon shot each. When the Csepel drew nevertheless nearer, the chief of staff on Sankt Georg ordered the Csepel back to the berth.

Altogether about 30 warships and about 3,000–4,000 men, out of a total of 5,000 naval personnel in Cattaro, took part in the uprising. Also the submarine base, the telegraph magazine, the naval mine command and the naval air station in Kumbor as well as the back-up battery in Gjenović (today: Đenovići) and the naval station Caballa were involved.

In place of the officers, sailors’ councils or crew committees, usually designated by acclamation, took over, and continued to organise the service in the normal way. A central committee was formed on SMS Sankt Georg. In the evening the committee handed over a note with the demands of the crews to the cruiser flotilla commander Rear Admiral Alexander Hansa, which contained both general political and crew-specific points:

"What we want

1. Measures to initiate an immediate general peace.
2. Complete political independence from other powers.
3. Peace based on the Russian democratic proposal, 'without annexation etc.'
4. Complete disarmament (demobilisation) and establishment of the voluntary militia.
5. Right of self-determination of the peoples.
6. An answer in good faith to Wilson's note.
7. Greater support and adequate food and clothing for the relatives of the conscripted.
8. Democratisation of the government.

-----------------------------

1. Due to malnutrition, omitting all unnecessary work and drill. For Korvees (Note: This term described work on shore by crews. These were particularly unpopular because they did not fall within the actual scope of duties, were associated with great physical effort and were sometimes connected with improvements in the lives of superiors; e.g. sports facilities set up for officers.) separate food allowance.
2. More shore leave and of longer duration.
3. Home leave strictly within 6 months once in the duration of 21 days without travel days. Same conditions for staff.
4. Introduction of a humane, faster transport for those on leave, increase of the boarding allowance for home leave and possibly delivery of the food in kind.
5. Equitable distribution of the ship's food. Same food for staff and crew.
6. Better supply of smoking materials, the same for staff and crew.
7. Abolition of censorship of letters.
8. Consideration of special requirements of individual ships and boats.
9. No consequences of any type for this demonstration.

Sailors' delegations of all units."

The rebels sent patrols ashore to persuade more units to join in. A patrol of the Gäa moored off Gjenović tried to persuade the crews of the nearby torpedo boats and submarines to join in by threat, but without much success. They were partly supported by the local population, throwing stones at the ships. The patrol of Sankt Georg was accompanied by an officer assigned by Rear Admiral Hansa. Hansa hoped to use this to steer the movement in calm waters and to be able to settle it through negotiations. He had assured the rebels, with the exception of those who had used weapons, that they would go unpunished if the uprising was ended. According to Plaschka's assessment, the members of the navy had "achieved a unique breakthrough that day."

The naval port commandant in Castelnuovo, Feldzeugmeister Guseck, the local army commander, had been informed of the course of events by Hansa via a telephone line which the insurgents only contained the next day. Guseck initiated comprehensive countermeasures, among them ordering of heavy naval forces from Pola as well as of infantry from the region. The German submarines sailed into the inner bay in the evening, which was perceived as a threat by the insurgents.

=== Second day of the uprising, 2 February 1918 ===
In the morning, Guseck's ultimatum was presented to the central committee: all crews had to return to order and discipline within three hours, otherwise order would be restored by all means.

The central committee, however, presented new demands to Hansa, including

"2. Agreement with factors from both houses of the House of Deputies. In addition, within 14 days deputies (or their representatives) should arrive at the Bocche [Bay of Kotor] for direct communication with the delegates of the Navy. "

A senior NCO, the Titularbootsmann František Rasch (Note: František Rasch, born 1889 in Prerau in Moravia, had a German father and a Czech mother. Spelling of his name according to the register of births and baptisms; scan available at: . His name is sometimes also written Franz Rasch or František Raš.) from the lighting department in Kumbor now served as spokesman for the central committee. Hansa promised benevolent consideration and renewed his offer of immunity from prosecution in case of termination of the movement. This led to heated discussions at "St. Georg" as many wanted to give up.

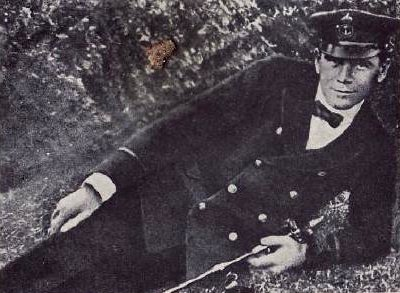
František Rasch

Finally, the only officer who had made himself available to the movement, navy officer cadet Anton Sesan (Note: Anton Sesan born 1892 in Lopud near Ragusa (the old name of Dubrovnik, see Veselý, Povstání, p. 41 f. ), came from a seafaring family of Serbian nationality and was a captain in the merchant navy before he was drafted (Plaschka/Haselsteiner/Suppan, Innere Front, p. 131).) from the naval aviation department in Kumbor, whom Rasch had won over for leading the action, managed to convince the crew to persevere. The delegates now went back to their ships and stations. Hansa arranged for an extension of the ultimatum. One condition was that no ship movements would take place.

Sesan suggested that the ships should risk an advance into the Adriatic Sea in order to attract international attention and to encourage the crews of other nations to take action as well. Rasch, however, was counting on the approaching troops to show solidarity. The fleet remained in the bay. (Note: This debate is also described by Veselý (Povstání, p. 56 f.) and in the report of the auditors mentioned below (pp. 1099); see also Fitl, Cattaro, p. 112 f.) Plaschka sees in Rasch the determining element of the revolt, who also clearly addressed the social-revolutionary perspective in his comments to Hansa: "that the system in the state must be overthrown."

Around 2 p.m., the crew committee of the "SMS Kronprinz Erzherzog Rudolf", which had been deployed as a guard ship at the harbour entrance off Porto Rose, decided to shift to the second, inner bay of Teodo to join the other rebel ships. In the process, the ship was fired upon by a land-based battery. Two dead sailors, among them Petty Officer Second Class Sagner, an important leader on the ship, were the result. The action, which was intended to lift the mood among the insurgents, caused great consternation in their ranks.

After the delegates of the fast cruiser "Novara" had returned from the flagship to their ship, the crew voted to keep the red flag as well. But the commander overrode their decision and ordered the ship to sail into the inner bay. In doing so, he allowed those sailors who feared being torn between the forces to leave the ship. When passing the "SMS Kaiser Karl VI", which was not far away, the red flag was put down. The rebels' threat to fire on falling off ships was not carried out. Later the other fast cruiser "SMS Helgoland", the torpedo boats and the destroyers followed. A new front against the revolting ships had emerged in the inner bay. Also the German submarine commanders were prepared to torpedo the rebellious ships if necessary.

During the night the central sailors' committee tried to send two telegrams by radio to Dr. Adler in Vienna and Count Károlyi in Budapest. They were asked to call on the government to intervene immediately, as to the committee's opinion the advance of the infantry may cause a general unrest in the Austro-Hungarian military. However, the committee had to rely on the land-based transmitter of the Naval Port Command. The stations on board had been manipulated by the specialist operators, so that the range was severely limited. (Note: Even on the first day the rebels had tried to telegraph to Pola to ask the sailors there to join. But the telegram did not reach Pola.) Guseck did not let the telegrams pass.

=== The third and last day of the uprising, 3 February 1918 ===
In the morning at 7:30 a.m. the 3rd Division from Pola with Erzherzog Ferdinand Max, Erzherzog Friedrich, and Erzherzog Karl as well as torpedo boats and destroyers entered the outer bay of Cattaro. The ultimatum had finally been set at 10 o'clock. On the remaining ships with red flags more and more crew members wanted to give up.

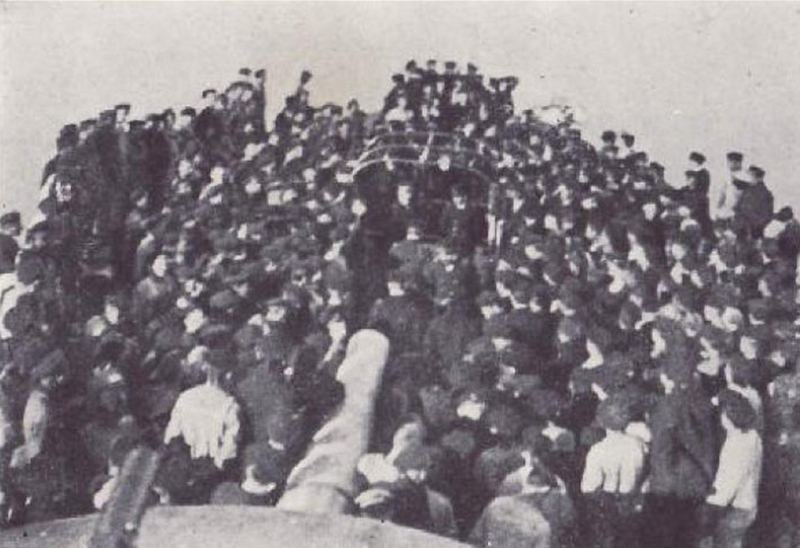
According to the description by Veselý and from the Central Military Archives in Prague, the photo shows the crew assembled at the stern of Sankt Georg at the surrender on 3 February 1918 at 10 a.m. In the middle, the ship's commander Scheibenhain can be seen. However, the description cannot be regarded as fully reliable, since no sources are given

Rasch and Sesan tried in the morning to persuade the crew of the Gäa to persevere, but most of them they could no longer convince. Sesan went to the airfield. Rasch went back to the Sankt Georg. There the crew demanded to vote again and it became clear that only very few were still in favour of the continuation of the uprising. Rasch ordered to drop the red flag and reported to Rear Admiral Hansa as a prisoner. Thereafter the few remaining ships also dropped the red flag; the rebellion ended. Sesan managed to escape to Italy with an aircraft together with Gustav Stonawski, who had chaired the central committee, and another NCO.

== Legal processing ==
On the same day, the disembarkation and detention of those crew members classified by the commanders as "irresponsible elements" began. There was no uniform policy, so that even committee members who had acted in the officers' interests, as well as crew members who had not joined the uprising but were generally considered unreliable, were among the 678 arrested. Peter Fitl has examined the procedures more closely in a publication published in 2018.

=== Drumhead court martial ===
Guseck, the commander of the naval port, had been charged with the prosecution. He selected 40 persons (Note: The 40 persons are listed by name in Frei, Cattaro, p. 136 f.) for the drumhead court martial. He demanded a quick conviction. The trial began on 7 February and must not take longer than three days. The charge was insurrection. The accused were assigned four officers as defence lawyers. The civilian lawyer Dr. Mitrović arrived only at the end of the last day of the trial. After a protest by the defence that the Präklusivfrist (expiration period) had been exceeded, the court declared that it had no jurisdiction over 18 defendants. Fitl criticises that in the event of an actual expiration (which cannot be determined nowadays), this should have applied to all the defendants. The defence attempted to decline the responsibility of the defendants: compulsion of the circumstances, carried away by the others, fear of artillery fire from "St. Georg", "Gäa", "Monarch". An important question was who had used weapons. In the case of the chief officer of the "St. Georg", Zipperer, it could not be clarified beyond doubt neither in the drumhead court martial nor later on in the ordinary court martial whether Šižgorić or Ujdur or both had fired at him. The defence lawyers protested when on the last day of the trial several witnesses who had been summoned were not heard. They also wanted to hear further witnesses in favour of the defendants. The requests were rejected, probably also because the court was under time pressure.

Finally, six men were found guilty of the crime of insurrection; out of these František Rasch, Anton Grabar, Jerko Sisgorić and Mate Berničevič received the capital punishment, Franz Bajzel and Ludwig Szekacs were sentenced to aggravated imprisonment (ten and five years respectively), and two men were acquitted. The remainder were handed over to the court martial. On the same day, the judges deliberated on a pardon petition to Guseck for those sentenced to death (a common procedure according to Fitl), and the majority voted in favor. Guseck rejected this application and confirmed the death sentences on 10 February.

The civil lawyer Dr. Mitrović sent a plea for clemency to the emperor, which he justified among other things by the unfair conduct of the trial. The emperor did not reply. The summary execution took place early in the morning on 11 February 1918, below the cemetery walls of the nearby village Škaljari. They were buried in a common grave.

=== Investigations ===
The ship commanders could now once again report potential defendants for the court martial. In some cases this resulted in an increase in some cases in a reduction of the number compared to the previous reports. A total of 45 persons were added to the 678 arrested. But Guseck decided that only 392 persons were to be questioned.

The interrogations began in April. The requirement to submit a written copy of the arrest warrant and an order of preliminary investigation was not complied with. The arrested persons were also not made aware of the possibility of lodging a complaint. The investigations were conducted by ten military lawyers (Auditoren), who also looked intensively into possible exculpatory aspects. The suspicions expressed by naval officers that the Entente had had a hand in the matter or that there had been agitation by political or national agents turned out to be groundless. In June, the investigations were finalised and the reports (Referate und Anträge) (Note: An example is the report written by the auditors on the events at "St. Georg", which was digitized by the Austrian State Archives and published on the Internet: Gericht des k.u.k. Kriegshafenkommandos in Cattaro: S.M.S. „St. Georg“. Referat und Antrag. Typoscript vom 9. April 1918, Österreichisches Staatsarchiv/Kriegsarchiv, Signatur KA MAG KT.1. Available at: .) were submitted. They requested that 234 of the accused be charged with mutiny or insurrection and that the remaining 351 be spared from prosecution. However, Guseck ordered charges against 392 persons, the remaining 193 were then released, or in some cases disciplined and in a few cases transferred to another court.

=== Court-martial ===
Guseck issued an indictment against 386 defendants at the end of August. Fitl suspects that the original indictment was flawed. The trial under auditor Major Wolf began on 16 September 1918 and took place in a sardine factory in Mulla near Cattaro. Guseck granted Wolf a public prosecutor he had requested. This was, Fitl concluded, not compatible with even contemporary ideas of a fair trial.

The officials took measures that news of the uprising and the legal proceedings should not be leaked. However, Julius Braunthal who was deployed in the region as a lieutenant in an artillery emplacement had already succeeded in February in informing Victor Adler of the SPÖ. Adler spoke to the War Minister on February 11. The minister promised to prohibit further executions. In return, the SPÖ refrained from making the events public. It was not until 8 October that insurrection and military court trials were discussed in the Reichstag, because of a query of the South Slavic deputy Dr. Anton Korošec. Giving in to the growing public pressure, Emperor Karl decided to continue the trial only against 31 "ringleaders, principal offenders and non-commissioned officers". Thereafter 348 persons were acquitted, but transferred to Pola.

On 31 October, the 37th day of the hearing, the trial was adjourned to 5 November. However, it could not be resumed due to political developments. According to Fitl a grotesque situation, because the South Slavic nations had already separated from the Habsburg monarchy; Emperor Karl had handed over the fleet to the newly founded South Slavic state; the k.u.k. court martial had finally tried crew members of the navy of a foreign state on a foreign territory. The trial was not concluded.

== Consequences ==
The commander-in-chief of the Austro-Hungarian Navy Admiral Maximilian Njegovan was forced to ask for his retirement after these events. He was replaced by Miklós Horthy who was promoted to counter-admiral. Rear Admiral Hansa was also replaced, the St. Georg was taken out of service and converted into a residential ship. While the army had been the decisive opponent in these events, also the incidents in this unit increased in 1918. See e.g. the Judenburg mutiny.

== Reception ==
The events received little public attention. It was not until nine years later that the journalist and doctor of philosophy Bruno Frei published a comprehensive study of the events in the newspaper Der Abend. He had access to the copies of the minutes of the drumhead court martial. These are now considered to be lost. Although Frei's work was rather propagandistic in the sense of his socialist and later communist world view, it is therefore also of interest to historians. In addition, some contemporary witnesses now came forward.

=== Monographs ===
In 1958 the Czech Jindřich Veselý published a small book about the events: Povstání v Boce Kotorské (Czech: Uprising in the Bay of Kotor). He also published a series of photos in the appendix. According to Fitl, he overemphasized the contribution of the Czech sailors. Plaschka's 1963 dissertation "Cattaro-Prag" is still considered the standard German-language work. The most extensive and significant study next to it was written by the Croat Bernard Stulli: "Ustanka mornara u Boki Kotorskoj (Croatian: Sailors' revolt in the bay of Cattaro)". Both worked through the files in the Austrian State Archives, which had then become accessible.

An Italian book on the events, La rivolta di Cattaro, appeared in 1935. The author, Capitano Neri, misappropriated the protagonists as pioneers of the Italian-nationalist ideology of irredentism.

Important studies in English were presented by Sondhaus and Halpern in 2001 and 2003 respectively.

=== Evaluations ===
After the First World War, the uprising in Austria and Hungary was predominantly perceived as subversive and harmful, while in the other successor states a rather positive perception was noticeable. After the Second World War, the Yugoslav and Czechoslovak Communist states, as well as Marxist Eastern European historiography, assessed the events as both Slavic and Bolshevik.

Plaschka came to the conclusion that the actions in Cattaro had been designed as a revolutionary demonstration. The red flags turned the demonstration into a rebellion. The events revealed a clear crack in the structure of the armed power. The determining element was not so much the unresolved nationality question but rather the social and political question.

According to the naval historian Halpern the event cannot be portrait as the beginning of the end of the monarchy, but as its last victory over the social forces that would eventually overwhelm it.

Using selected historical sources, Kuhl compared the Cattaro uprising with the Kiel mutiny. He found clear parallels between the events. But the action in Cattaro had begun when the great wave of strikes in the country had just ended. Thus the action came too late and remained isolated in contrast to the events in Kiel. In Kiel, the sailors and stokers got into contact with a workforce and land-based navy personnel that immediately supported them.

=== Novels, stories, dramas ===
- The German writer Friedrich Wolf (1888-1953) wrote the drama "Die Matrosen von Cattaro" in 1930, based on Bruno Frei's book.
- The journalist and historian Eva Priester deals with the uprising in the story "Begegnung im Morgengrauen (encounter at dawn)". The story is included in the volume: Vom Baume der Freiheit. Sechs historische Erzählungen. (From the tree of liberty. Six historical narratives.) Globus-Verlag (Austrian communistic publication house), Vienna 1955.
- The working class writer Franz Xaver Fleischhacker, who witnessed the uprising aboard a torpedo boat, wrote the novel: Cattaro. Roman aus den letzten Tagen der k.u.k. Kriegsmarine. (Novel from the last days of the k.u.k. Kriegsmarine). Globus-Verlag, Vienna 1957. (Note: Fleischhacker (1891-1976) was a sergeant in 1918 and sometime aboard "SMS St. Georg"; further information about him can be found in: Manfred Mugrauer: "Vergessener Büchlschreiber". Der Arbeiterschriftsteller Franz Xaver Fleischhacker (1891–1976) ("Forgotten writer of small books". The working-class writer Franz Xaver Fleischhacker (1891-1976)). In: Mitteilungen der Alfred-Klahr Gesellschaft, 4/07, pp. 13–17; available at: .)

=== Commemoration ===
In front of the Škaljari cemetery about 15 minutes walking distance from Kotor (Cattaro), there is a memorial. At this place, below the cemetery wall, the four sailors were executed.

There are plaques both on the courthouse and on the prison in Kotor which refer to the events and to the executed sailors.

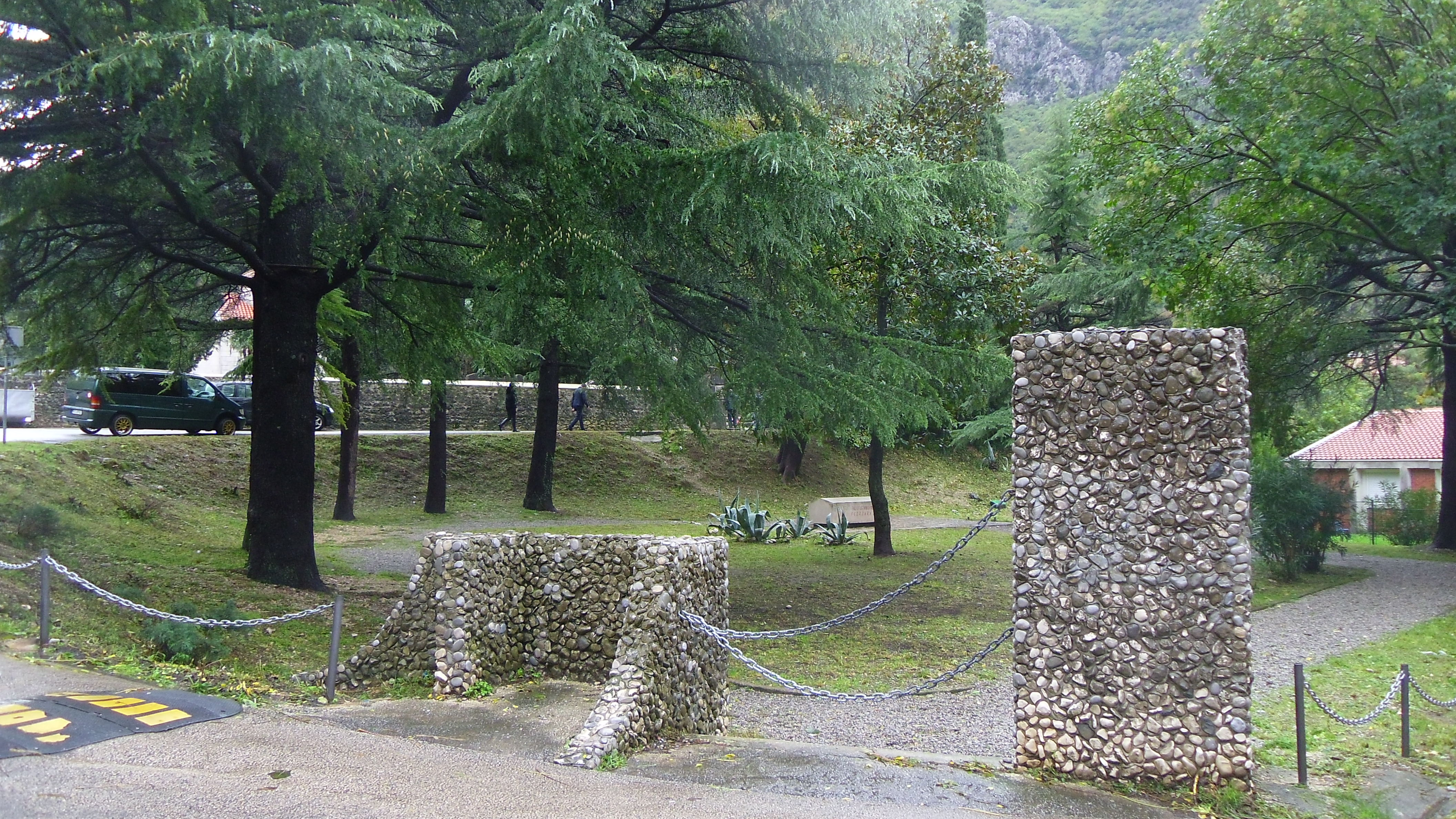
Memorial in front of the Škaljari cemetery, about 15 minutes walking distance from Kotor (Cattaro). At this place, below the cemetery wall, the four sailors were executed.

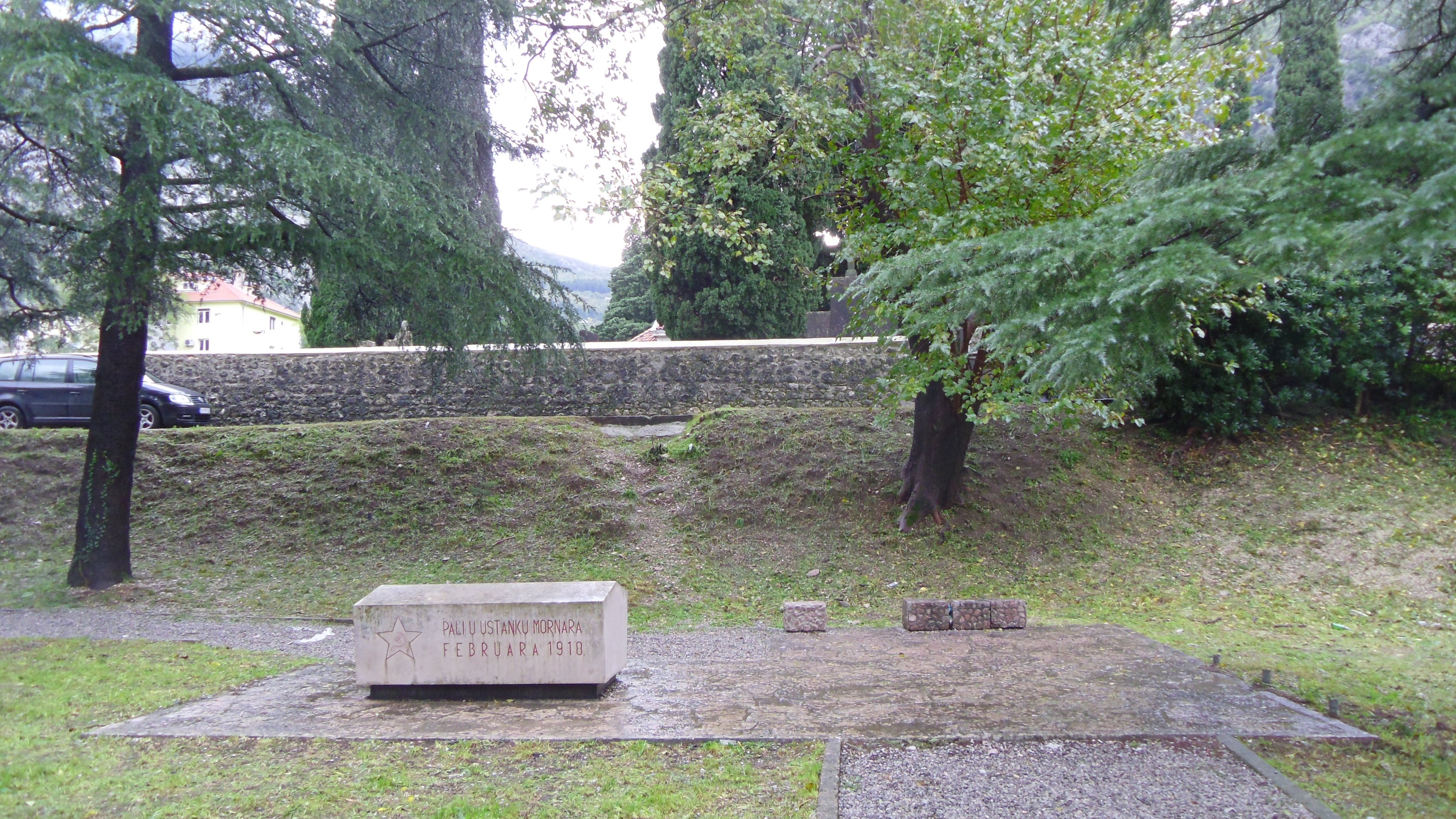
Memorial stone within the memorial site, front side with the inscription: Pali u ustanku mornara Februara 1918 (Croatian: They fell in the sailors' revolt in February 1918).

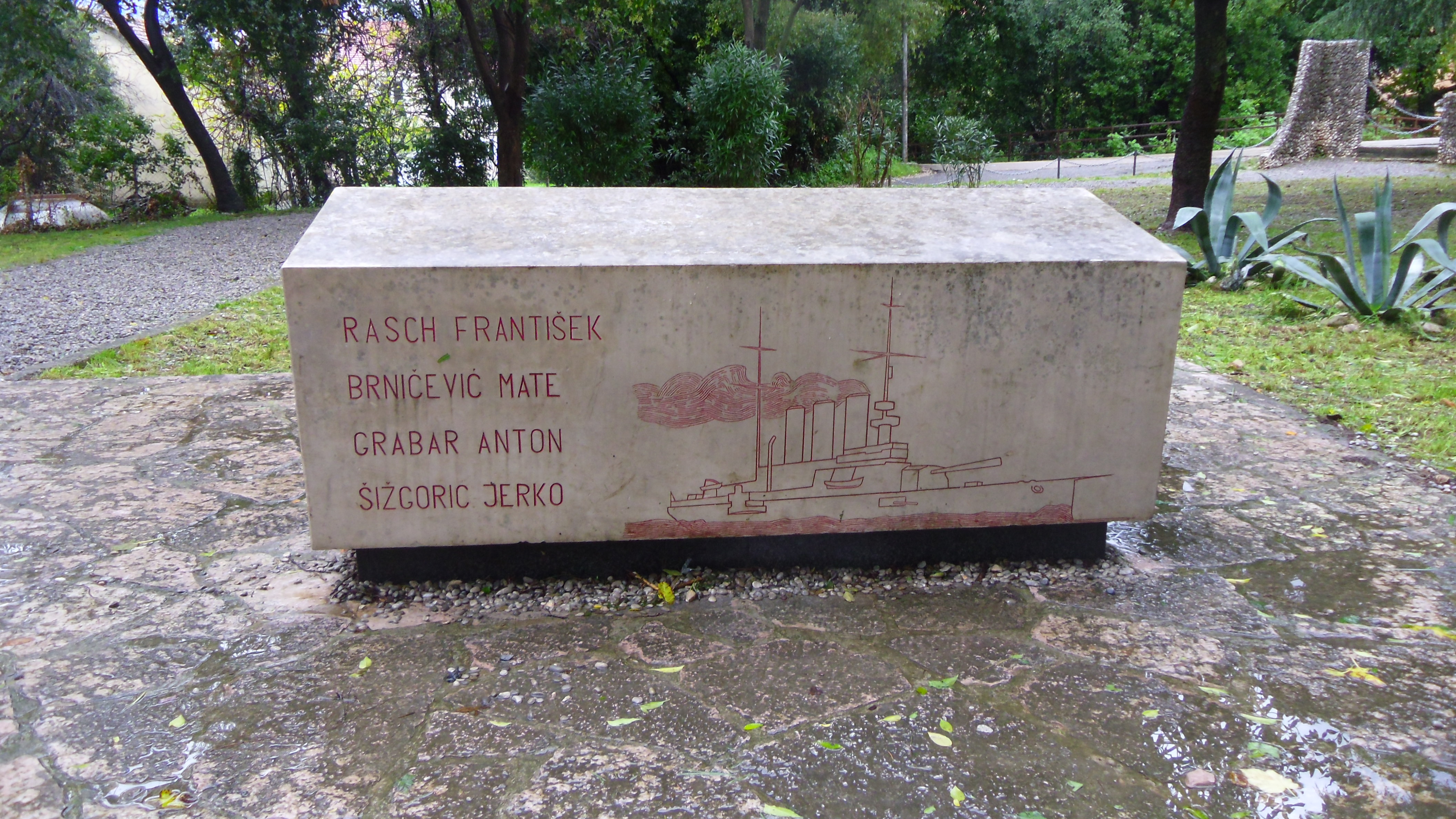
Memorial stone back with the names of the executed and a relief of "St. Georg".

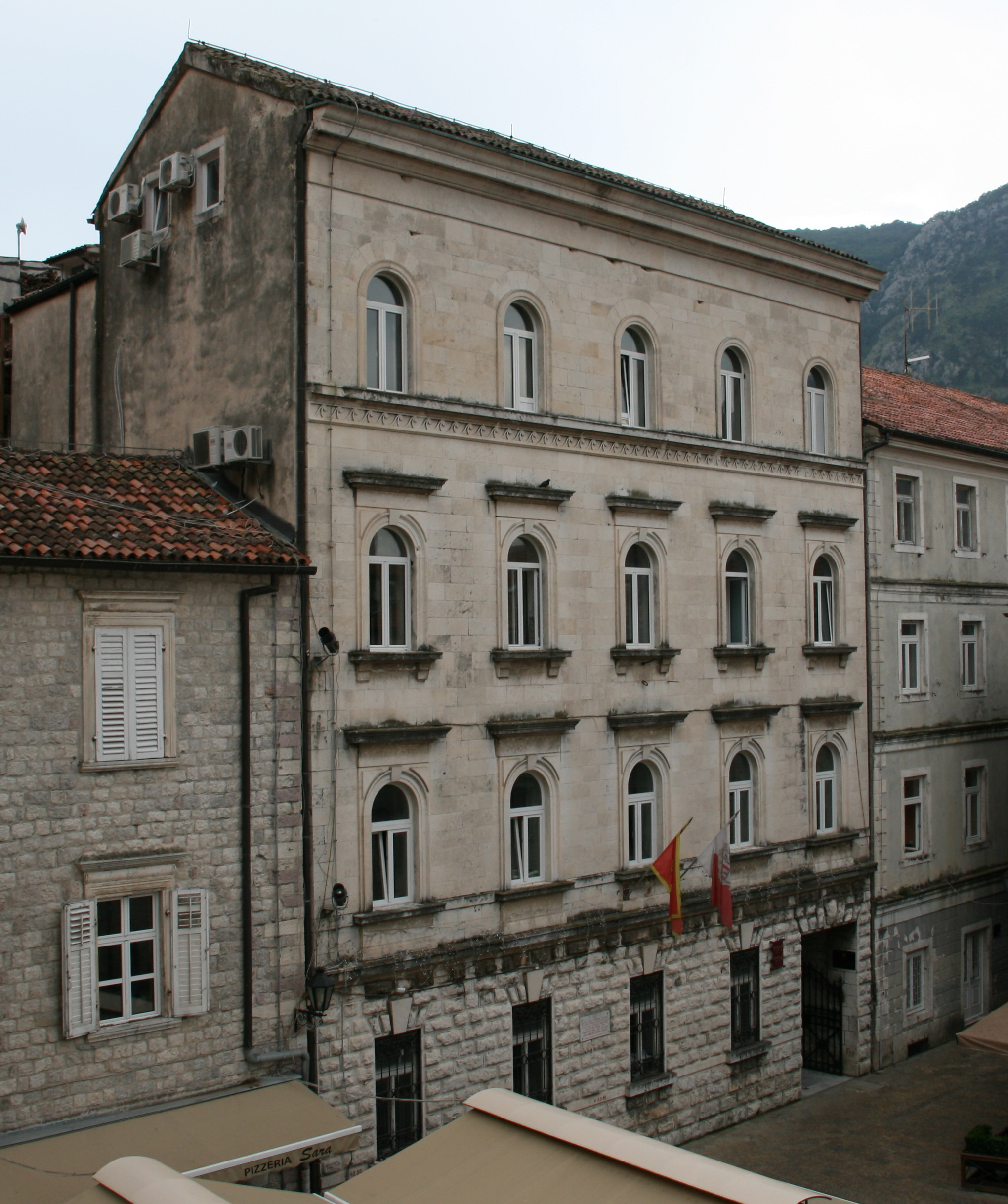
In this Kotor building the drumhead court martial took place.

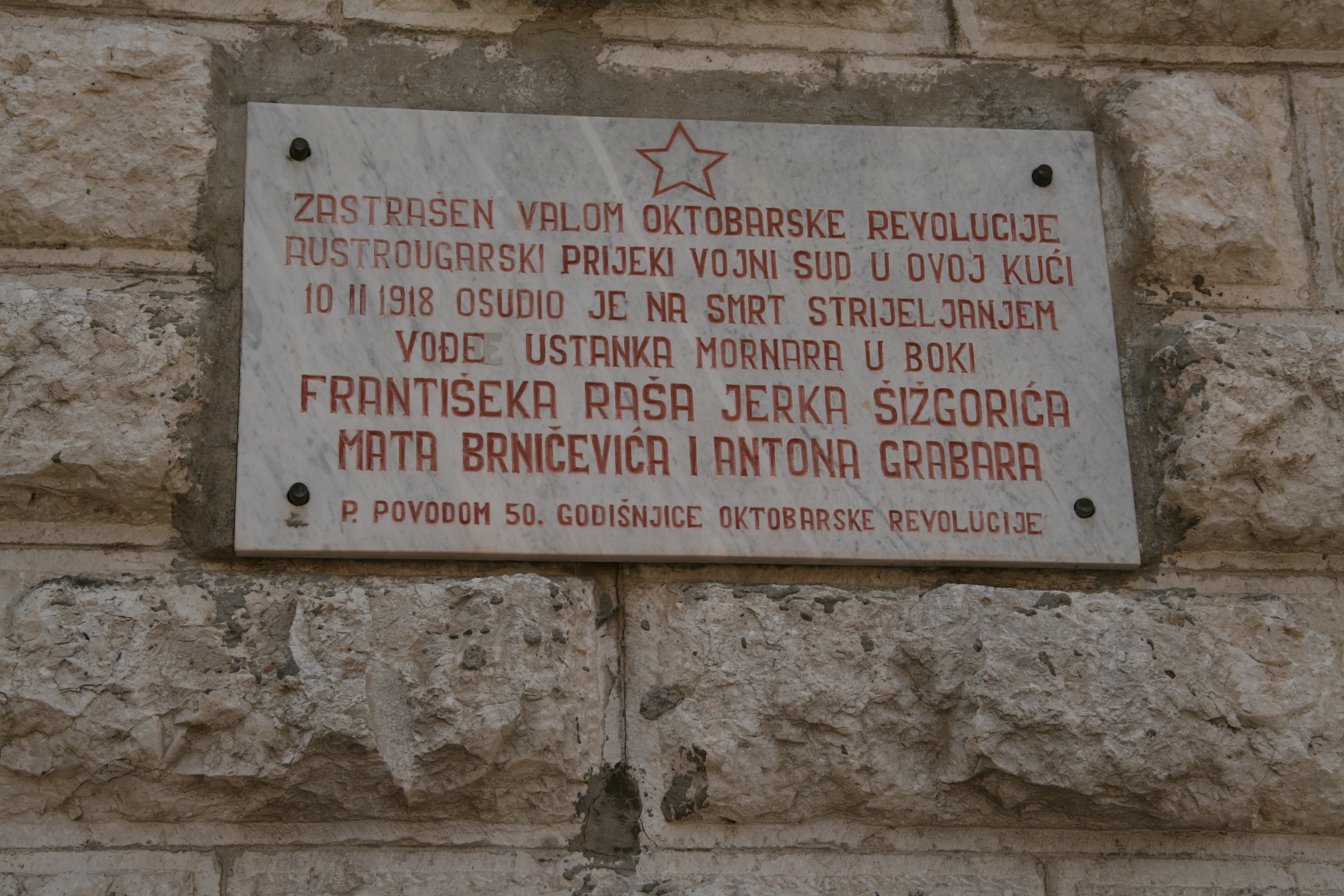
This plaque was attached to the building on the occasion of the 50th anniversary of the October Revolution: "Intimidated by the wave of the October Revolution, an Austro-Hungarian court martial in this house sentenced to death the leaders of the sailors' revolt in the Bay on 10.II.1918."

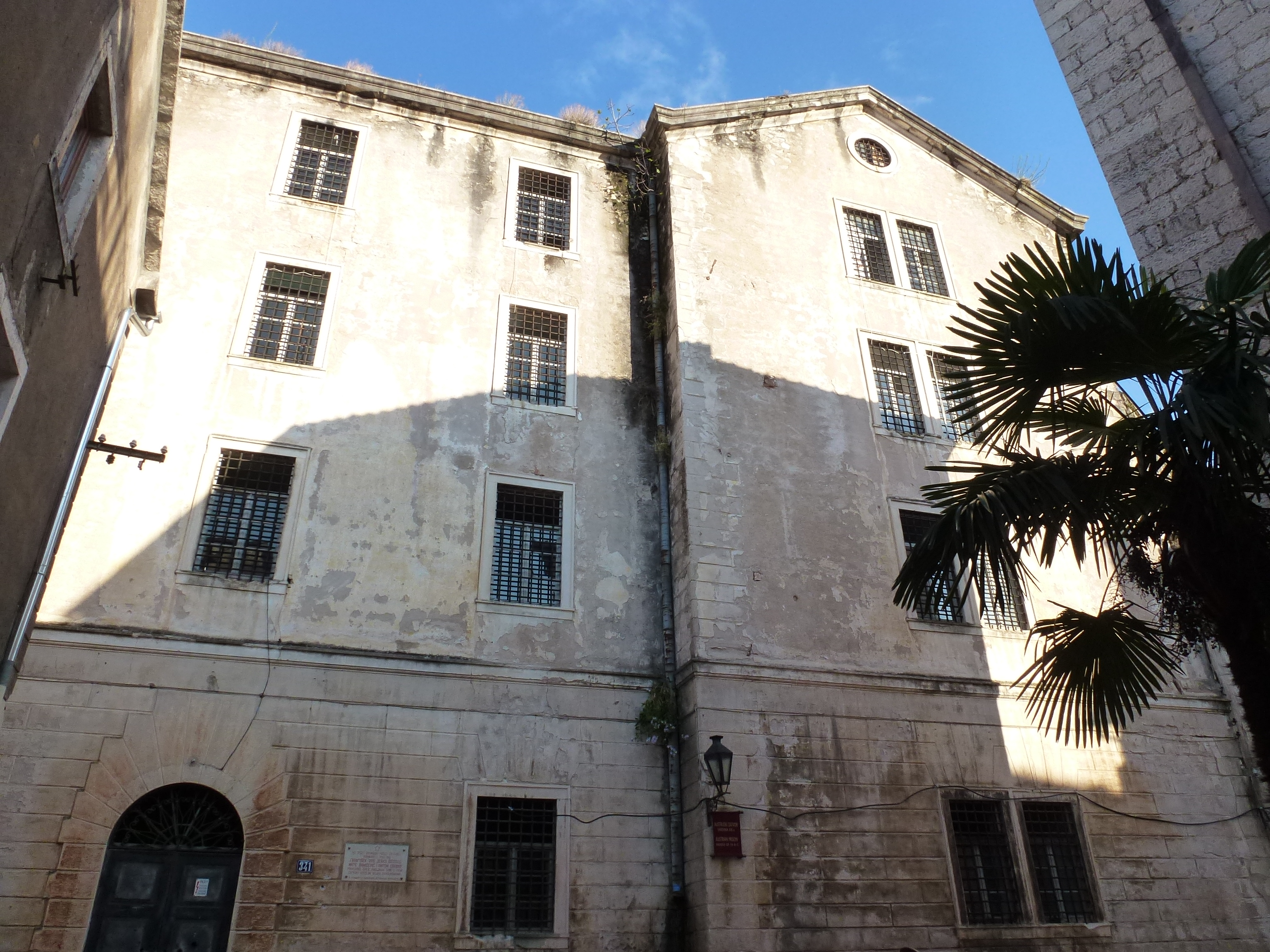
Prison in Kotor, where the convicts were kept.

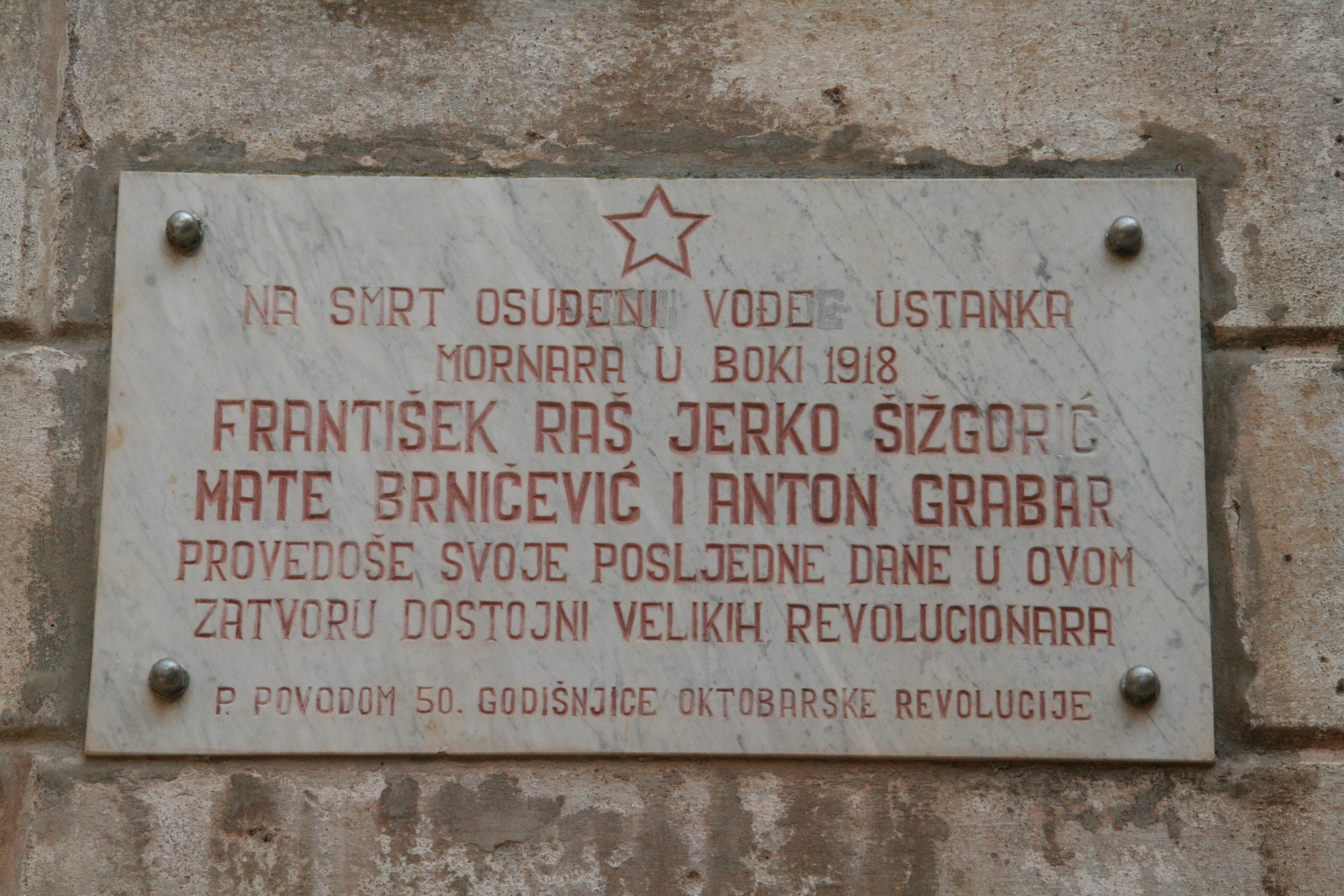
This plaque was attached to the building on the occasion of the 50th anniversary of the October Revolution: "The leaders of the Sailors' Uprising of 1918, sentenced to death [names] spent their last days in this prison, which was worthy of the great revolutionaries."

== Literature ==
- Peter Fitl: Meuterei und Standgericht. Die Matrosenrevolte im Kriegshafen Cattaro vom Februar 1918 und ihr kriegsgerichtliches Nachspiel. Wien 2018.
- Bruno Frei: Die Matrosen von Cattaro. Eine Episode aus dem Revolutionsjahr 1918. Neuausgabe Berlin 1963.
- Paul, G. Halpern: The Cattaro Mutiny, 1918. In: Christopher M. Bell./Bruce A. Elleman (Hrsg.): Naval mutinies of the twentieth century. An international perspective. London 2003, pp. 54–79.
- Klaus Kuhl: Das Aufbegehren der Matrosen von Cattaro im Februar 1918 – ein Vorläufer des Kieler Matrosenaufstands (The revolt of the sailors of Cattaro in February 1918 - a forerunner of the Kiel mutiny)? In: Jürgen Jensen (Hrsg.): Mitteilungen der Gesellschaft für Kieler Stadtgeschichte, Band 89, Heft 3, Kiel 2017, pp. 127–140.
- Simon Loidl: Gehorsamverweigerung. Der Matrosenaufstand von Cattaro. In: Mitteilungen der Alfred-Klahr Gesellschaft, Heft 3/2014, S. 1–5. Online zugänglich (aufgerufen 3. Dezember 2019) unter: .
- Simon Loidl: „Zweianhalb Tage waren wir frei.“ Zur literarischen und Politischen Rezeption des Matrosenaufstands von Cattaro in Österreich. In: JahrBuch für Forschungen zur Geschichte der Arbeiterbewegung, Heft III/2014, pp. 131–152.
- Richard G. Plaschka: Avantgarde des Widerstands. Modellfälle militärischer Auflehnung im 19. und 20. Jahrhundert. 2 Bde. Wien 2000.
- Richard, G. Plaschka: Cattaro – Prag. Revolte und Revolution. Kriegsmarine und Heer Österreich-Ungarns im Feuer der Aufstandsbewegungen vom 1. Februar und 28. Oktober 1918. Graz 1963.
- Richard, G. Plaschka/Horst Haselsteiner/Arnold Suppan: Innere Front. Militärassistenz, Widerstand und Umsturz in der Donaumonarchie 1918. Bd. 1: Zwischen Streik und Meuterei. Wien 1974.
- Erwin Sieche: Die Kreuzer der k. und k. Marine. Wölfersheim 1994 (Marine – Arsenal, Bd. 25).
- Lawrence Sondhaus: Austria–Hungarian Naval Mutinies of World War I. In: Jane Hathaway (Hrsg.): Rebellion, Repression, Reinvention. Mutiny in Comparative Perspective. Westport 2001, pp. 196–212.
- Bernard Stulli: Ustanka mornara u Boki Kotorskoj 1.– 3. februara 1918 (Croatian: Sailors’ uprising in the bay of Kotor 1. – 3. Februar 1918). Split 1959.
- Jindřich Veselý: Povstání v Boce Kotorské. Historická kronika (Czech: Uprising in the bay of Kotor. Historical chronic). Prag 1958. Available online as pdf-file with a different page numbering at: .
- David Woodward: Mutiny at Cattaro, 1918. In: History Today, 1976 vol. 26, issue 12, pp. 804–810.
