= Chris Jones (drama critic) =

British-American journalist and academic

Personal details
- Born: Christopher Nigel Jones; September 10, 1963 (age 63) Manchester, England, UK
- Education: University of Hull (BA); Ohio State University (MA, PhD)
- Awards: George Jean Nathan Award

Christopher Nigel Jones (born September 10, 1963) is a British-American journalist and academic. He is the chief theater critic and Sunday culture columnist of the Chicago Tribune. Since 2014, he has also served as director of the Eugene O'Neill Theater Center's National Critics Institute. Jones has appeared on the news broadcast of CBS-2 Chicago as a weekly theater critic.

In 2018, Jones was additionally named Broadway theater critic for the newly acquired Tribune related publication, the New York Daily News. In 2021 he was named Editorial Page Editor of the Tribune, while he continues to review theater both in Chicago and New York. Jones writes many of the Tribune's editorials and supervises both the editorial board and the Opinion team.

In 2001, Jones was featured in an article in American Theatre magazine about the 12 most influential theater critics in America. In 2016, the New York Times cited Jones as an important reason that Broadway shows try-out in Chicago, noting the role his reviews have played in helping producers improve productions for New York runs. Jones' well-known public interviews include Stephen Sondheim, Lin-Manuel Miranda (where he famously beat-boxed on stage with Miranda), Jessica Lange, Salman Rushdie, Gov. J.B. Pritzker, former Chicago Mayor Rahm Emanuel, Pete Townshend, David Mamet, Harvey Fierstein, Alan Cumming, and John Waters.

== Early life and education ==
A native of Bury, England, Jones attended the United Kingdom's Bury Grammar School and University of Hull, from which he graduated with honors in 1984 with a joint BA in Drama and English. He moved to the United States to pursue his MA in Theatre at Ohio State University, which he received in 1986. He earned his PhD in 1989 with his dissertation Populism, the Mainstream Theatre, and the Plays of Willy Russell.

== Career ==
=== Academia ===
From 1990 to 2000, Jones taught at Northern Illinois University, rising from assistant professor, to associate professor and then as professor and associate chair of the School of Theatre and Dance. From 2000 to 2002, he served as associate dean of The Theatre School at DePaul University, where he remains an adjunct professor. He left his tenured post in academe to join the Chicago Tribune full-time in 2002. Jones also teaches at the University of Chicago Graham School.

=== Theatre and cultural criticism ===
Jones started his career as a critic in the 1980s by contributing film reviews, interviews, and reports for WCBE-FM in Columbus, Ohio, and also served as the long-time film critic for the Columbus Alive alternative weekly newspaper. Beginning in the mid-1980s, he began writing for Variety and Daily Variety, developing a particular specialty in reviewing out-of-town tryouts of Broadway musicals, for which he became nationally known. During this time, his arts criticism was also often published in the Los Angeles Times, the New York Times, the Washington Post, American Theatre magazine as well as other newspapers and magazines. He is among the most prolific critics in the nation, reviewing about 200 Chicago shows a year and covering all the major Broadway openings. In 2018, he also became Broadway theater critic for the Tribune Publishing owned New York Daily News.

Jones has twice served on the jury of the Pulitzer Prize for Drama. For some two decades, he has chaired the American Theatre Critics Association committee that annually recommends a theater for the Tony Award to an outstanding regional theatre.

== Awards ==
In 2015, Jones was a co-winner of the George Jean Nathan Award, the most prestigious award for drama criticism in the United States. Chosen annually by an interdisciplinary faculty committee headed by the English department chairs at Cornell, Princeton and Yale Universities, the Nathan Award honors scholarly and journalistic dramatic criticism. In making the award, the committee highlighted Jones' review of The Project(s), an American Theater Company docudrama exploring the lives of Chicago public housing residents.

His other honors include the Gold Medallion from the American College Theatre Festival, for his work with young theater critics. He has received five Peter Lisagor Awards from the Chicago Headline Club for arts criticism and arts and entertainment reporting and the Illinois Theatre Association's 2012 Award of Honor. In 2013 he was awarded the James Friend Memorial Award for Literary and Dramatic Criticism by the Society of Midland Authors for his "exemplary contribution to theater, culture and the arts." In 2016, he was the Maegene Nelson Visiting Scholar at Texas Tech University in Lubbock, Texas. In 2023, Jones received an honorary Doctorate in Humane Letters from Columbia College Chicago in recognition of his service to the city and its culture. He was also the featured speaker at Columbia's graduation that same year.

== Personal life ==
Jones is married to Gillian Darlow, who is the chief executive officer of the Polk Bros. Foundation in Chicago. Together they have two sons.

== Books ==
Telling the story of Chicago's theatrical history, his book, Bigger, Brighter, Louder: 150 Years of Chicago Theater (published in 2013 by the University of Chicago Press, ISBN 978-0-226-05926-6) showcases the plays, writers and productions that went on to shape the country's theatrical landscape. A tryout of A Raisin in the Sun with then unknown Sidney Poitier, a "lost" interview with Tennessee Williams, the first performance of the musical Grease, and the biting wit of Claudia Cassidy and Peregrine Pickle are collected among dozens of reviews, each featuring commentary by Jones that puts the excerpt into cultural and historical context.

In 2015, Jones wrote the introduction to How to Write About Theater, a book published by Methuen. (ISBN 978-1-4725-2054-8)

Jones authored, Rise Up! Broadway and American Society from 'Angels in America' to 'Hamilton', a book published by Bloomsbury in 2018. (ISBN 978-1-350-07193-3)
