= Judenburg mutiny =

1918 armed rebellion

- Part of World War I
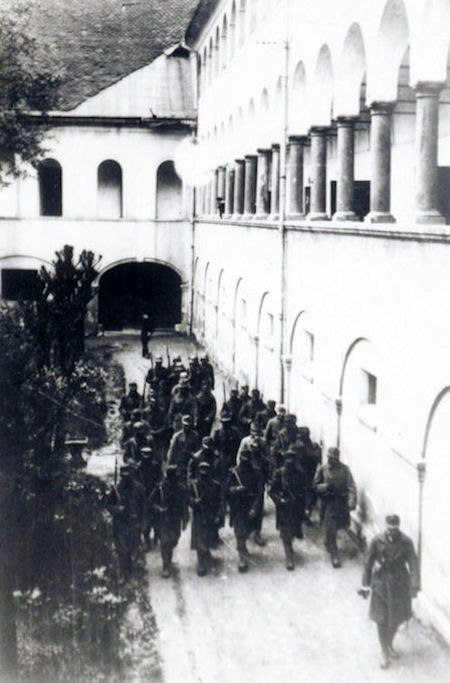
- The convicted mutiny leaders being led to the execution site, 16 May 1918
| Date | 12 May 1918 |
| Location | Judenburg |

Belligerents
| Imperial-Royal 17th infantry regiment ("kranjski Janezi") | Austria-Hungary |

Commanders and leaders
| Anton Hafner | Anton Kosel |

Strength
| 1,300 rebels of the 40th infantry battalion | unknown |

The Judenburg mutiny was an armed rebellion that took place in the town of Judenburg, Austria-Hungary in May 1918. The mutiny was motivated by unwillingness of some military personnel to serve Austria-Hungary during the latter part of World War I. This incident came in the final stages of the war as a result of several other rebellions within the military of Austria-Hungary sparked by length of the conflict and a difficult situation on the Isonzo front. The uprising was forcefully ended, and its key leaders convicted by a military court and executed.

== Background ==
By 1918, the Austro-Hungarian position in the war was difficult. The armed conflict was already in its fourth year, with the United States increasingly assisting the Entente forces. Armed forces of Austria-Hungary were multi-ethnic, with several battalions consisting almost entirely of members of ethnic minority groups living within the monarchic state. The Slovenes, being located directly next to the Isonzo front, had experienced the full effects of the war since Italy joined the Entente and engaged Austria-Hungary. Slovene-majority naval units, who were noted within the state to clash with the leadership, also joined forces in a major rebellion against authorities in the Bay of Kotor on 3 February, which had required repression by other, loyal naval units.

== Rebellion ==
Soldiers of the largely Slovene Imperial-Royal 17th infantry regiment, also known as "Carniolian Janezes" (Slovene: kranjski Janezi), began the rebellion in Judenburg on 12 May. The event involved 1,300 soldiers of the 40th infantry battalion, later also parts of 41st and 42nd infantry battalions. The mutiny came as a result of unwillingness of the military personnel to return to the front because they were the designated replacement on the battlefield. The week before the rebellion was also dubbed "Emperor Charles Week" (Slovene: teden cesarja Karla), when soldiers were traditionally supposed to receive treats for their meals, which were not made available in this instance. Among other reasons for this mutiny was the demand of demobilisation, striving for peace and for national liberation. On the evening of 12 May, Anton Hafner, corporal of the regiment, held a speech in front of the unit, proposing to resist the authorities' order on going back to the front. Many soldiers complied and began breaking in the military granaries to steal food. Afterwards many of them went into the urban districts, armed. The officers in command fled and reported the mutiny to the military administration outside the settlement, while many of the rebels looted the town and celebrated their rebellion in local pubs. Other soldiers not involved in the looting reorganised and successfully took control of many of the key points in the area in minor clashes which resulted in an unknown number of casualties.

== Aftermath ==
Soldiers involved in the rebellion largely went home unorganised after taking control of Judenburg. The state authorities managed to catch many of the military personnel involved, including the leaders of the revolt, Anton Hafner, Alojzij Rogelj, Alojz Štefanič, Karel Možina and Joso Dautović. All of them were subsequently sentenced to death in a military trial. The executions took place on May 16. All of the others involved were given prison sentences.

== See also ==
- Cattaro Mutiny
