= Curtis Hollingsworth =

American baseball player

- Pitcher
- Born: December 18, 1916; Jackson, Mississippi, U.S.
- Died: May 30, 1988 (aged 71); Birmingham, Alabama, U.S.
- Threw: Left

Negro league baseball debut
- 1946, for the Birmingham Black Barons

Last appearance
- 1947, for the Birmingham Black Barons

Teams
- Birmingham Black Barons (1946–1947)

Curtis Lanneal Hollingsworth (December 18, 1916 – May 30, 1988) was an American Negro league baseball pitcher in the 1940s.

A native of Jackson, Mississippi, Hollingsworth played for the Birmingham Black Barons in 1946 and 1947. He died in Birmingham, Alabama in 1988 at age 71.
