= Charlie Sevior =

Australian rules footballer, born 1908

Personal information
- Full name: Charles Robert Sevior
- Born: 11 May 1908; Flemington, Victoria
- Died: 28 May 1988 (aged 80); Heidelberg West, Victoria
- Height: 174 cm (5 ft 9 in)
- Weight: 72 kg (159 lb)

Playing career^{1}
Years	Club	Games (Goals)
1930	Essendon	5 (2)
- ^{1} Playing statistics correct to the end of 1930.

Charles Robert Sevior (11 May 1908 – 28 May 1988) was an Australian rules footballer who played with Essendon in the Victorian Football League (VFL).
