= Sidney Wewege =

South African cricketer

Personal information
- Born: 26 September 1907; King William's Town, South Africa
- Died: 16 May 1988 (aged 80); Johannesburg, South Africa
- Source: Cricinfo, 12 December 2020

Sidney Wewege (26 September 1907 – 16 May 1988) was a South African cricketer. He played in ten first-class matches from 1934/35 to 1937/38.
