= Bjørn Gulbrandsen =

Norwegian ice hockey player

Bjørn Sigmund Gulbrandsen (9 January 1927 – 20 May 1988) was a Norwegian ice hockey player. He was born in Oslo, Norway and represented the club Vålerengens IF. He played for the Norwegian national ice hockey team, and participated at the Winter Olympics in 1952, where the Norwegian team placed 9th.
