= Jaime Giralt =

Spanish rower

Personal information
- Full name: Jaime Giralt Casanova
- Nationality: Spanish
- Born: 13 January 1902; Barcelona, Spain
- Died: 12 May 1988 (aged 86); Barcelona, Spain

Sport
- Sport: Rowing

Jaime Giralt Casanova (13 January 1902 – 12 May 1988) was a Spanish rower. He competed in two events at the 1924 Summer Olympics.
