= Joep Brandes =

Dutch footballer (1920–1988)

Personal information
- Full name: Petrus Leendert Brandes
- Date of birth: 26 June 1920
- Place of birth: The Hague, Netherlands
- Date of death: 6 May 1988 (aged 67)
- Position: Forward

Senior career*
Years	Team	Apps	(Gls)
1940–1942	DUNO		
1942–1944	VUC		
1944–1946	't Gooi		
1946–1950	Feijenoord		
1950–1951	Nîmes	13	(3)
1951–1955	Montpellier	68	(13)
1955–1956	Be Quick 1887		

International career
1949	Netherlands	3	(0)

Managerial career
- 1956–1957: Enschedese Boys
- 1957–1962: Zwartemeer
- 1968–1969: PEC Zwolle
- 1969–1970: Eindhoven
- * Club domestic league appearances and goals

Joep Brandes (26 June 1920 – 6 May 1988) was a Dutch footballer. He played in three matches for the Netherlands national football team in 1949.

He also managed PEC Zwolle and Eindhoven as well as several amateur sides like Zwartemeer.
