= Sol Polk =

American businessman

- Born: Sol Pokovitz; May 14, 1917; Chicago, Illinois
- Died: May 15, 1988 (aged 71); Chicago, Illinois
- Occupation: Businessman
- Known for: co-founder of Polk Brothers

Sol Polk (May 14, 1917 – May 15, 1988) was an American businessman and co-founder of appliance retailer Polk Brothers.

== Early life ==
Polk was one of six children born to their Romanian Jewish immigrant father, Henry Pokovitz and to their Austrian Jewish immigrant mother, Yetta Reyen.

== Career ==
He worked as a concessionaire at the 1933 World's Fair and then during the Great Depression, sold irons and ironing boards door-to-door. In 1935, he founded the Central Appliance and Furniture Co. with his brother, Sam. In 1946, the company was incorporated and the name changed to Polk Brothers, Inc. after the five Polk brothers: Sol, Samuel, Morris, Harry and David He fought in Europe during World War II attaining the rank of master sergeant.

Polk Brothers became wildly popular as the first appliance retailer to sell at a discount to the suggested manufacturers retail price and in the 1950s and 1960s, Polk Brothers became the largest retailer of brand-name appliances in the country with 15 stores and over $100 million in annual sales. Polk Brothers was also the first retailer of color television sets and microwave ovens in the country.

Polk had a reputation as showman and master merchandiser for his innovative and bold marketing campaigns. He was one of the first to advertise in color on television which helped to fuel the purchase of color television. In 1957, he offered a job to the unemployed Lord Mayor of Dublin and in 1966, he bought 250,000 pineapples and handed them out to customers.

== Recognition and legacy ==
In 1958, Polk won the Mr. Big Heart Award for civic and charitable work in the March of Dimes campaign. In 1966, he received the B`nai B`rith Humanitarian Award. Polk was a member of the Standard Club, the Covenant Club and the Executives Club. Polk never married. In 1988, Polk died; services were held at the Oak Park Temple.

Polk Brothers closed in 1992 and its assets transferred to the Polk Bros. Foundation. The Polk Family Foundation subsequently donated $20 million to the redevelopment of Navy Pier; the park and fountain at the entrance to the pier was named the Polk Brothers Park and Fountain.
