= Murray Gainger =

Australian rules footballer

Personal information
- Full name: Murray Gainger
- Born: 11 September 1939
- Died: 31 May 1988 (aged 48)
- Original team: Beeac
- Height: 175 cm (5 ft 9 in)
- Weight: 80 kg (176 lb)

Playing career^{1}
Years	Club	Games (Goals)
1960	Richmond	3 (0)
- ^{1} Playing statistics correct to the end of 1960.

Murray Gainger (11 September 1939 – 31 May 1988) was a former Australian rules footballer who played with Richmond in the Victorian Football League (VFL).
