= Peter Timmis =

English cricketer

Personal information
- Full name: Peter John Timmis
- Born: 30 July 1942; Stoke-on-Trent, Staffordshire, England
- Died: 10 May 1988 (aged 45); Northampton, Northamptonshire, England
- Batting: Right-handed
- Bowling: Right-arm fast-medium

Domestic team information
- Years: Team
- 1971: Minor Counties
- 1963–1979: Staffordshire

Career statistics
Competition	First-class	List A
Matches	1	3
Runs scored	–	8
Batting average	–	4.00
100s/50s	–/–	–/–
Top score	–	8*
Balls bowled	72	174
Wickets	–	3
Bowling average	–	25.33
5 wickets in innings	–	–
10 wickets in match	–	–
Best bowling	–	2/9
Catches/stumpings	–/–	–/–
- Source: Cricinfo, 20 June 2011

Peter John Timmis (30 July 1942 – 30 May 1988) was an English cricketer. Timmis was a right-handed batsman who bowled right-arm fast-medium. He was born in Stoke-on-Trent, Staffordshire.

Timmis made his debut for Staffordshire in the 1963 Minor Counties Championship against the Lancashire Second XI. Timmis played Minor counties cricket for Staffordshire from 1963 to 1979, which included 100 Minor Counties Championship matches. In 1971, he made his List A debut against Glamorgan in the Gillette Cup. He played 2 further List A matches for Staffordshire, against Dorset and Lancashire in the 1973 Gillette Cup. In his 3 matches, he took 3 wickets at an average of 25.33, with best figures of 2/9. Timmis made a single first-class appearance for the Minor Counties cricket team against the touring Indians in 1971. He didn't bat in this match, but did bowl 12 wicket-less overs.

He died in Northampton, Northamptonshire on 30 May 1988.
