= Bruno Frei =

Austrian political writer and journalist

- Born: Benedikt Freistadt; 11 June 1897; Preßburg, Austria-Hungary
- Died: 21 May 1988 (aged 90); Klosterneuburg, Austria
- Education: University of Vienna
- Occupations: Journalist, writer
- Political party: SDAP; KPD; KPÖ
- Spouse: Maria Muellauer (1890–1940)
- Children: 2

Bruno Frei (real name Benedikt Freistadt; 11 June 1897 – 21 May 1988) was a political (Marxist) writer and journalist. He was born in Preßburg, and the family moved to Vienna in 1909. Following the frontier changes mandated in 1919, he spent much of his adult life and career in that city, although he spent six of the Hitler years exiled in Mexico.

Sources most frequently name him as Bruno Frei, but he is also sometimes identified as Karl Franz, a pseudonym under which some of his work was published.

== Life ==
=== Early years ===
Benedikt Freistadt was born in Preßburg, Austria-Hungary (today Bratislava, Slovakia). His father, Michael Freistadt, was in business. The family was poor, although through his mother, born Berta Hauser, he was related to Heinrich Heine. Preßburg was a cultural melting pot, and in an age when national identity and language had become important, it is noteworthy that his mother's first language was Hungarian although fluency in German, his father's first language, was necessary outside the front door. In any case, when he was 12 the family re-located to Vienna. Three years later, when he was 15, he abandoned his training for the rabbinate.

=== Journalism ===
Bruno Frei made his earliest journalistic contributions in 1917. He provided material for the recently established left-liberal Viennese newspaper Der Abend. He was much influenced by the newspaper's thoughtfully Communist proprietor, Karl Colbert. It was a mark of the times that on 18 March 1918 "Der Abend" was closed down by the authorities: it was relaunched as "Der neue Abend" on 10 June 1918, but reverted to its former title on 31 October 1918. Frei was at this point not a full-time journalist, since in 1915/16 he also commenced his study of Philosophy at the University of Vienna. While at university he was able to attend lectures and presentations by Sigmund Freud, Max Adler and Karl Kraus. He came into contact with socialist groups and in 1918 himself joined the Social Democratic Workers' Party (Sozialdemokratische Arbeiterpartei Deutschösterreichs / SDAP)—as it was known till 1933. In the revolutionary ferment that followed national military defeat he drew close, politically, to the group around Josef Frey (who later became a Communist Party official). He was awarded his doctorate on 30 June 1920 for a dissertation entitled "The Ethics of Pirkei Avot as a Paradigm for Ethics of Judaism" ("Die Ethik des Pirque Aboth als Paradigma einer Ethik des Judentums").

=== Berlin ===
In 1920, he re-located to Berlin to work as foreign correspondent for Der Abend. According to his own writings, he was disappointed that the revolutionary events that marked Germany during 1918/19 had not triggered more than a feeble echo in Vienna. Berlin, he stated, was a "workers' city" and as such at the heart of "events" in a way that Vienna was not. In Berlin, he was a frequent visitor to the Romanisches Café where he got to know politically like-minded left-wing writers including Egon Kisch and Anton Kuh. Another member of the circle was Stefan Großmann, who was editor of a weekly cross-party political journal called Das Tage-Buch (literally: "The Diary") for which Frei contributed material.

During his time in Berlin, Frei also set up, with Léo Lania, the "ABC Press Agency". In the winter of 1923/24, with widespread destitution in Germany threatening to erupt into street violence, the German Communist Party was banned, and the left-wing "ABC Press Agency" came under close police scrutiny. Frei published his first contribution in the political weekly, Die Weltbühne in 1923. Although not a mass-market publication, within the German speaking world, Weltbühne enjoyed a far higher profile with the politically aware than the newspapers and magazines for which Frei had been writing up till now. After Carl von Ossietzky took over as editor in chief. In 1927, Frei became a more frequent contributor, joining the permanent staff in 1929.

=== Vienna ===
In the meantime, in 1927/28, he returned for a year or so to Vienna, taking on leadership of foreign policy coverage at Der Abend. He stayed in Austria long enough to publish, in addition, the first comprehensive study of the 1918 sailors' mutiny at the Cattaro Bay naval base. In 1928, he undertook a reporting visit to the Soviet Union, which formed the basis for a volume entitled In the Country of the Red Power ("Im Lande der roten Macht"), published in 1929.

=== Return to Berlin ===
In 1929, he was persuaded by Willi Münzenberg to make a permanent return to Berlin. Münzenberg was setting up "Berlin am Morgen" a new daily newspaper, providing a Communist perspective and targeting a mass readership, and he offered Frei the job of managing editor. The newspaper provided a platform for a number of leading writers of the political left, and it continued to be published until banned, in 1933.

=== Prague exile ===
The political backdrop changed in January 1933 when the Nazi Party took power and converted Germany into a one-party dictatorship. Frei himself was not, at this stage, a card carrying Communist Party member, but most of his professional friends and colleagues were. With his ear close to the ground, he was among the first to understand that the government would use the Reichstag fire of 27 February to justify a round-up of Communists in Germany. He resolved to flee abroad in order to avoid being caught up in the programme of mass arrests that indeed ensued. He quickly arranged to flee with Franz Carl Weiskopf, a fellow newspaper editor based in Berlin who also had a home in Prague. In Prague they created "Gegen-Angriff" ("Counter-attack"). The magazine, which first appeared in September 1933 and continued to appear, with Bruno Frei its editor in chief, till 1936, was published both as a conscious provocation and as a rejoinder to "Der Angriff" ("The Attack"), founded as a Nazi newspaper by Joseph Goebbels and published since 1927 in Berlin.

=== Paris exile ===
In 1934, Bruno Frei belatedly joined the German Communist Party, which had been illegal in Germany since the previous year. The party leadership had, for the most part, managed to emigrate, some to Moscow and many others to Paris which quickly became a de facto headquarters for the German Communist Party in exile. Frei emigrated from Prague to Paris in 1936. His work was published in various antifascist newspapers and journals such as "Neue Deutsche Blätter" (literally: "New German pages") and "Nouvelle d‘Autriche" ("News of Austria"). It was also in 1936 that he became a co-editor for the "News of Germany" press agency, also serving as secretary for the Paris-based Protection League for German Authors abroad ("Schutzverband deutscher Schriftsteller im Ausland").

=== War and arrest ===
War resumed in September 1939 when Germany invaded Poland and the French government (like the British government) declared war on Germany. A period of eerie "normality" followed. However, in May/June 1940 the German army invaded France, rapidly occupying the northern half of the country and installing a puppet government in the south. The 1938 merger of Austria with Germany had left Bruno Frei as a citizen of Hitler's Germany, but in May 1940 he was stripped of both his German citizenship and of his university doctorate because he was Jewish. In June, the French authorities (like the British) responded to events by arresting large numbers of political refugees who had fled to Paris a few years earlier in order to escape the Nazis. Frei was one of these "anti-Hitler people" identified as enemy aliens and arrested. Well informed, as ever, he had already prepared his little suitcase and was ready when the police arrived unannounced in the middle of the night. The French arresting officer spotted books about Stalin and Hitler in his apartment and appeared unable to comprehend that the books were actually unequivocally critical of the dictators in questions. It was only when he was taken to a huge room in a nearby police station that was filled with fellow German exiles from Nazism that Frei appreciated the colossal scale of the mass arrest in progress. They were then taken to the Roland Gaross Sports Arena. In the arena he briefly caught sight of his fourteen-year-old son who called out to him "Mummy is...", but he heard no further. After a few days the internees were transported. Frei's destination was the huge camp at Le Vernet, in the far south.

After his arrest, Frei was separated from his family, and he was left unaware of whether or not they had also been arrested. It was only later that he discovered what had happened to his wife, Maria. The German army had over-run Paris very rapidly, and the city had suffered only a single German air-raid, but in that bombing raid Maria Freistadt had been killed.

=== Camp Vernet ===
Conditions at Camp Le Vernet, which had hitherto operated as a reception centre for republicans escaping from Franco following the defeat of the Second Spanish Republic, were initially less savage than those encountered in the concentration camps in Germany, but security was progressively tightened, and in 1941 the authorities prepared to separate out the many Jewish-German internees for transportation to purpose built concentration camps Germany where an uncertain fate would await them. Supported by contacts in the international writers' associations, and with help from Gilberto Bosques, the heroic Mexican consul in Marseille, Bruno Frei succeeded in obtaining release and a passage to Mexico, travelling there via Trinidad and the USA.

=== Mexico exile ===
In Mexico, Frei was one of many German refugees from Nazism. In Mexico City he co-founded and then became chief editor of the magazine "Freies Deutschland" ("Free Germany"). He also became a member of "Austrian Republican Action in Mexico" ("Acción Republicana Austriaca en México"). In 1943, he joined the exiled Austrian Communist Party and co-founded with Leo Katz (writer) another publication, "Austria Libre".

=== Return to Vienna ===
He returned to Vienna in April 1947. In 1948, he took over as chief editor of the newly re-established daily newspaper, "Der Abend", produced by the Communist Party publisher, Globus-Verlag. He switched in 1956 and a stint as foreign correspondent for the newspaper Volksstimme, in Beijing, followed, till 1959. During the later 1950s he was engaged in a series of journalistic projects. Together with Ernst Fischer und Viktor Matejka he launched the Communist oriented journal Wiener Tagebuch, serving as its editor in chief from 1960 till 1964.

His memoirs were published in 1972.

Bruno Frei died at Klosterneuburg, a short distance upstream from Vienna, on 21 May 1988.

== Family ==
Bruno Freistadt was married to Maria Muellauer (1890–1940). Their son, Hans Freistadt, was born in Vienna on 6 September 1925. There was also a daughter, Lisa Freistadt.

Maria Freistadt was killed in an air raid on Paris in June 1940. The children both crossed to the USA in 1940, though it is not clear from sources whether they crossed to North America on the same ship as their father.

Once in the USA, Hans Freistadt was supported by Jewish refugee organizations as he worked through high school and Chicago University. He subsequently earned a doctorate in physics from North Carolina, acquired US citizenship in 1944, and appeared all set for a distinguished career as a nuclear physicist. He then fell foul of McCarthyism, however, and after robustly refusing to recant his socialist beliefs, was stripped of his university fellowship following a (briefly) high-profile hearing before the Congressional Joint Committee on Atomic Energy. He now trained successfully for an alternative career, as a physician. Hans Freistadt died in 2015.

Unlike her brother, Lisa Friestadt was able to join her father in Mexico, like him later returning to Vienna after the war.
