= Polk Brothers =

Consumer electronics retailer, 1935–1992

Polk Bros., Inc.
- Type: Private
- Industry: Retailing
- Founded: 1935 (Illinois)
- Defunct: July 8, 1992
- Headquarters: Chicago, Illinois, USA
- Key people: Sol Polk
- Products: Retailing-Electronics Retailing-Furniture
- Revenue: NA
- Number of employees: NA
- Website: None

Polk Brothers was a large home appliance and electronics retailer in Chicago, Illinois that had 17 stores in the region at its peak in the 1980s.

Polk Bros. was the dominating electronics/appliance retailer in the Chicago market in the 1980s. The chain was known for its aggressive "let's make a deal" salesmen who would pair off with customers as they came in the door. It was an industry leader in innovative merchandising and was chosen to be the first retailer in the US to sell color televisions and microwave ovens.

== History ==
=== Early history ===
One of the original discounters, Polk Bros. Inc. was founded by Sol Polk, the son of Romanian Jewish immigrants, on the Northwest Side in the Portage Park community area of Chicago in 1935. The first outlet was on Central Avenue under the name Central Appliance and Furniture at 3334 N. Central Avenue.

Owner Sol Polk was considered a master pitchman. He ran in-store promotions that offered everything from TVs to Christmas trees. Polk served as the president of the North American Retail Dealers Association (NARDA), and his innovative and flamboyant promotions of the industry's products gained him nationwide recognition. He also was frequently called on to appear at hearings on proposed industry-related legislative and regulatory hearings held by the United States Congress and federal and state agencies.

=== Decline and bankruptcy ===
A fire during the evening of June 1, 1987 that gutted the company's warehouse and adjacent headquarters at 8311 W. North Avenue in Melrose Park put the company in financial straits, and the death a year later of 71-year-old CEO Sol Polk sent it spiraling downward. The 1990-91 recession and the arrival of new competitors such as Best Buy sealed Polk Bros.' fate.

The chain closed on July 8, 1992, in a grand "going out of business" sale.

A Menards occupied the rebuilt Polk Brothers store in Melrose Park until the mid-2010s when it moved out of that store to build a store of its own further west on North Avenue just east of the now-demolished Navistar plant.

== Polk Bros. Foundation ==
The company's assets were rolled over into the Polk Bros. Foundation, today one of the Chicago area's largest charitable organizations. With assets of $385 million, the foundation in one year dispensed 350 grants totaling $15.7 million to organizations. The foundation has funded organizations such as the Chicago Children's Choir, The Chicago High School for the Arts (ChiArts), and the University of Chicago.

The Polks also had a vast investment portfolio that included ownership interests in such bygone Chicago retailers as Wieboldt's and Goldblatt's. They also held thousands of acres of real estate around the country, most of it divested.
