= Škaljari =

- Town
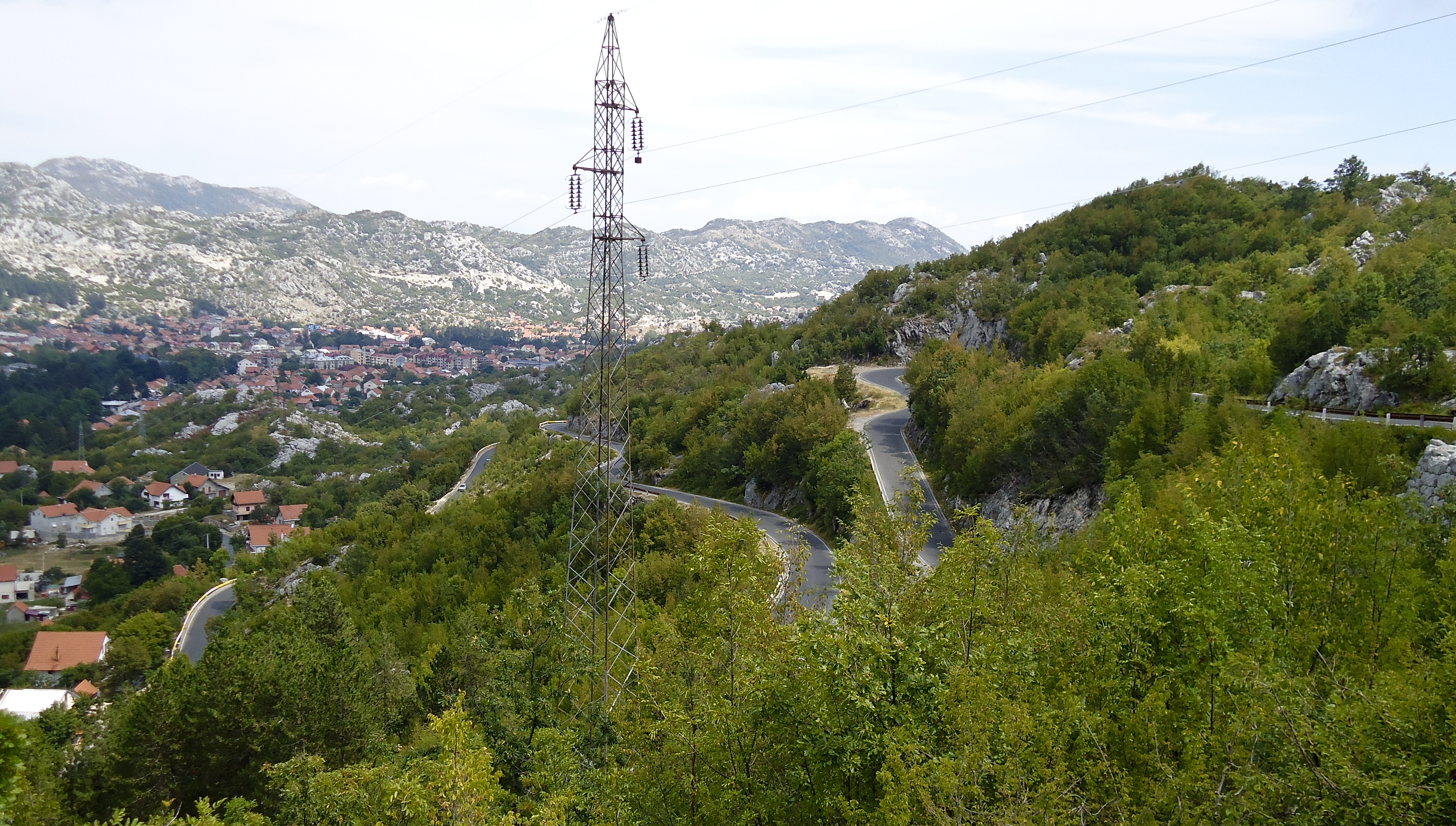

- Location within Montenegro
- Country: Montenegro
- Region: Coastal
- Municipality: Kotor

Population (2011)
  - Total: 3,807
- Time zone: UTC+1 (CET)
  - Summer (DST): UTC+2 (CEST)

Škaljari is a small town in the municipality of Kotor, Montenegro. It is located just south of the town of Kotor.

== Demographics ==
The town's population was 4,002 at the 2003 census, and 3,807 at the 2011 census.

Ethnicity in 2011
Ethnicity	Number	Percentage
Montenegrins	2,126	55.84%
Croats	415	13.80%
Serbs	273	9.07%
Roma	60	1.58%
Albanians	23	0.60%
Macedonians	18	0.47%
Italians	9	0.24%
Hungarians	9	0.24%
other/undeclared	496	13.03%
Total	3,807	100%
