= Italian frigate Luigi Rizzo =

Luigi Rizzo has been borne by at least two ships of the Italian Navy in honour of Luigi Rizzo and may refer to:

- Italian frigate Luigi Rizzo (F 596), a Bergamini-class frigate launched in 1960 and stricken in 1980.
- Italian frigate Luigi Rizzo (F 595), a Bergamini (2011)-class frigate launched in 2015.
