= SMS Viribus Unitis =

Austro-Hungarian battleship

Coordinates: 44°52′9″N 13°49′9″E

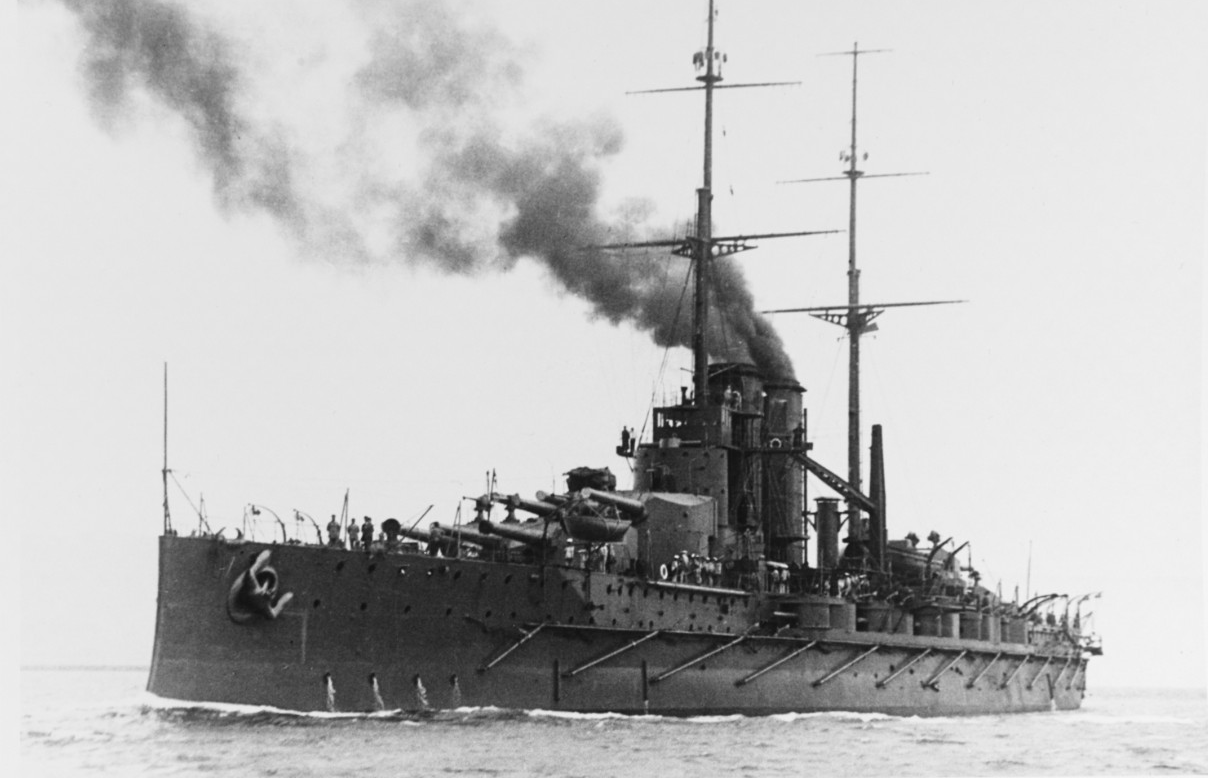
- SMS Viribus Unitis in 1912

History

Austria-Hungary
- Name: Viribus Unitis
- Ordered: 1908
- Builder: Stabilimento Tecnico Triestino, Trieste
- Laid down: 24 July 1910
- Launched: 24 June 1911
- Sponsored by: Archduchess Maria Annunciata of Austria
- Commissioned: 5 December 1912
- Fate: Handed over to the State of Slovenes, Croats and Serbs on 31 October 1918.

State of Slovenes, Croats and Serbs
- Name: Viribus Unitis or possibly Jugoslavija
- Acquired: 31 October 1918
- Fate: Sunk, 1 November 1918

General characteristics
- Class & type: Tegetthoff-class battleship
- Displacement: 20,000 t (19,684 long tons) (standard)
- Length: 152 m (498 ft 8 in)
- Beam: 27.9 m (91 ft 6 in)
- Draught: 8.7 m (28 ft 7 in)
- Installed power: 12 Yarrow boilers; 27,000 shp (20,000 kW)
- Propulsion: 4 shafts; 4 steam turbines
- Speed: 20.4 knots (37.8 km/h; 23.5 mph)
- Range: 4,200 nmi (7,800 km; 4,800 mi) at 10 knots (19 km/h; 12 mph)
- Complement: 1,042 men (1,087 max)
- Armament: 4 × triple 30.5 cm (12 in) guns; 12 × single 15 cm (5.9 in) guns; 12 × single 7 cm (2.8 in) guns; 3 × single 66 mm AA guns; 2 × 66 mm (2.6 in) L/18 landing guns; 4 × 533 mm (21 in) torpedo tubes
- Armour: Belt, barbettes, turrets and conning tower: 11 in (279 mm); Deck: 1.4 in (36 mm)

SMS Viribus Unitis (Note: "SMS" stands for "Seiner Majestät Schiff ", or "His Majesty's Ship" in German.) was an Austro-Hungarian dreadnought battleship, the first of the Tegetthoff class. "Viribus Unitis", meaning "With United Forces", was the personal motto of Emperor Franz Joseph I.

Viribus Unitis was ordered by the Austro-Hungarian Navy in 1908 and was laid down in Stabilimento Tecnico Triestino shipyard in Trieste on 24 July 1910. Viribus Unitis was launched from the shipyard on 24 June 1911 and was formally commissioned into the Austro-Hungarian Navy on 5 December 1912. She spent her early career performing training missions and making trips to foreign ports. In June 1914, she carried Archduke Franz Ferdinand on a trip to Bosnia with his wife Sophie. During his visit to Sarajevo, he was assassinated by Gavrilo Princip in the event that caused the beginning of World War I.

During World War I, Viribus Unitis took part in the flight of the German battlecruiser SMS Goeben and light cruiser Breslau. In May 1915, she also took part in the bombardment of the Italian port city of Ancona. Viribus Unitis was sunk while at anchor by limpet mines emplaced by Italian sailors on 1 November 1918.

== Construction and design ==
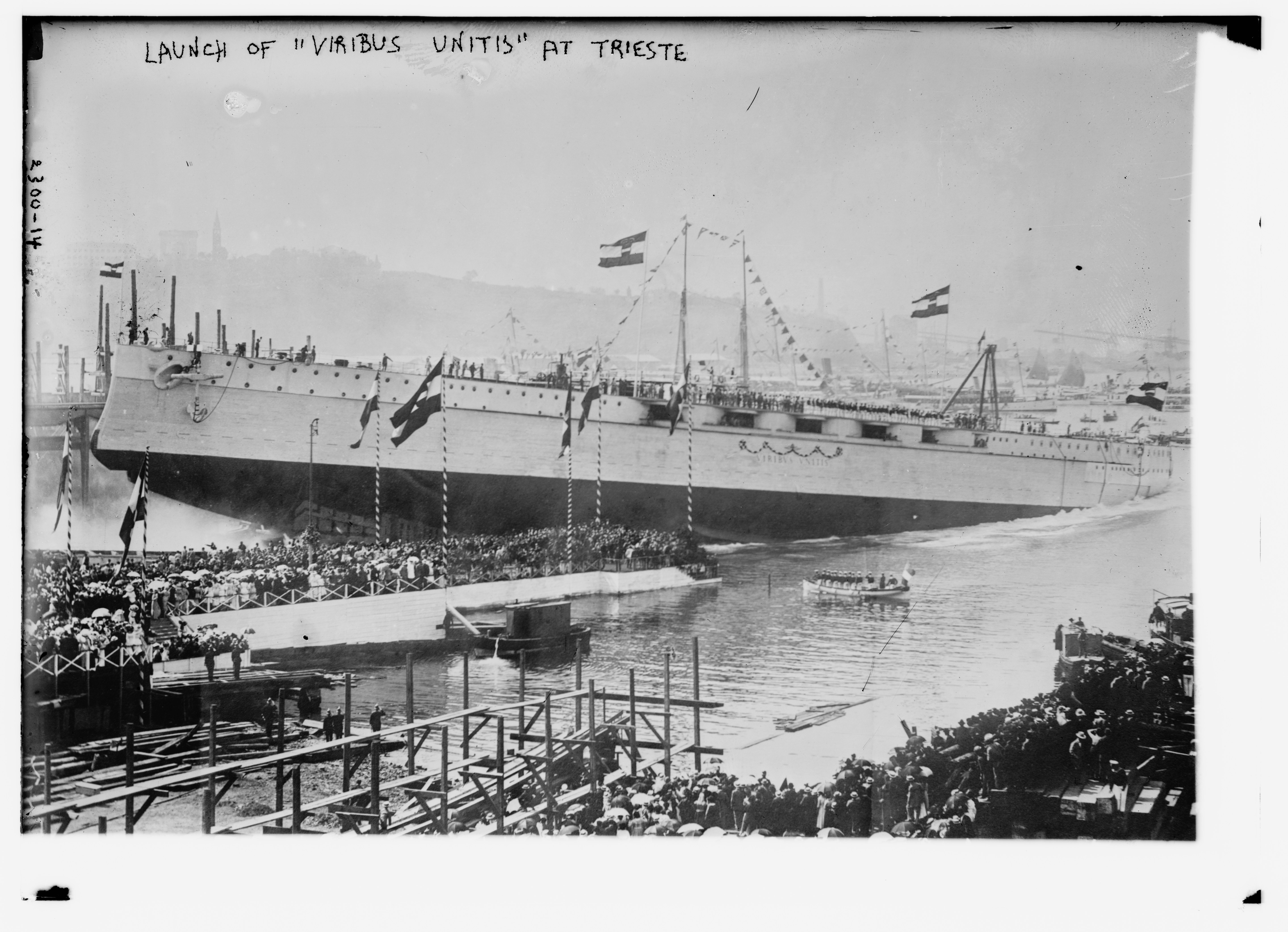
Launch of Viribus Unitis in Trieste, 24 July 1910

=== Construction ===
Viribus Unitis was ordered in 1908 as the first of a class of four, the first dreadnoughts to be built for the Austro-Hungarian Navy. Initially intended to be named Tegetthoff, she was renamed on the personal order of Emperor Franz Josef; following this, the second ship of the class was named Tegetthoff. The ship was laid down in the Stabilimento Tecnico Triestino shipyard in Trieste on 24 July 1910. Following eleven months of construction, Viribus Unitis was launched on 24 June 1911. Following her fitting out, she was commissioned into the Austro-Hungarian Navy on 5 December 1912.

=== Characteristics ===
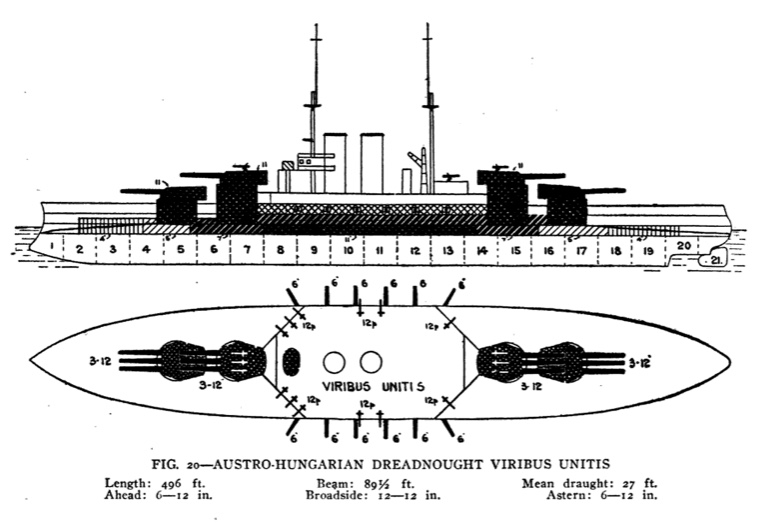
A line drawing of Viribus Unitis, lead ship of the Tegetthoff class

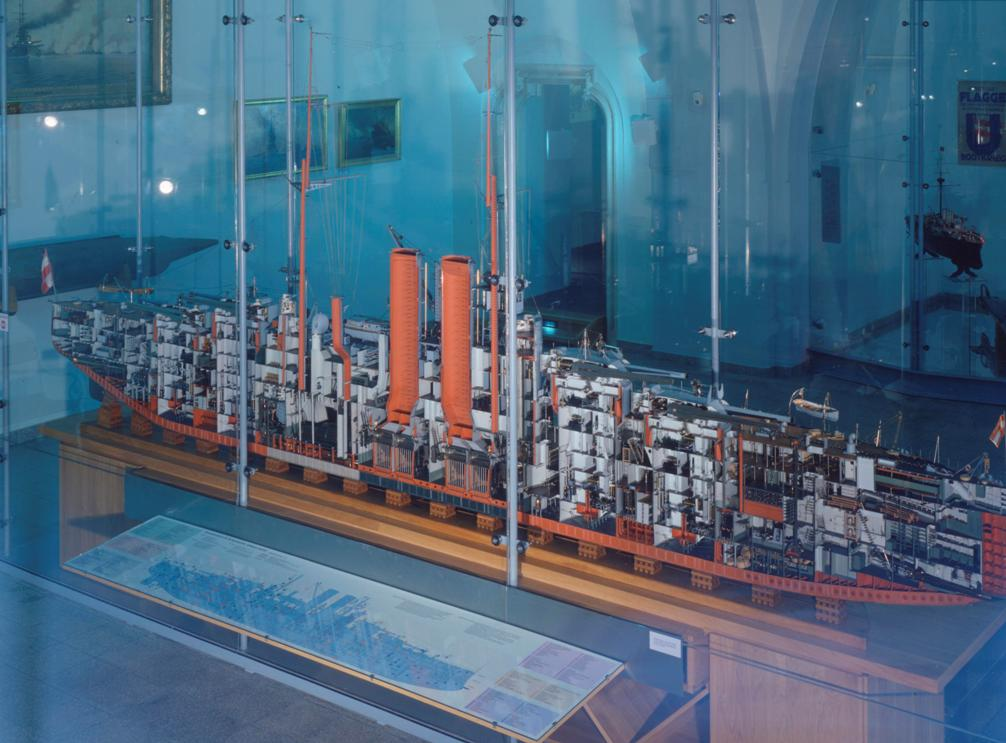
Model of Viribus Unitis in the Museum of Military History, Vienna

Viribus Unitis had an overall length of 152 metres (498 ft 8 in), a beam of 27.9 metres (91 ft 6 in), and a draught of 8.7 metres (28 ft 7 in) at deep load. She displaced 20,000 tonnes (19,684 long tons) at load and 21,689 tonnes (21,346 long tons) at deep load.

Viribus Unitis had four Parsons steam turbines, each of which was housed in a separate engine-room. The turbines were powered by twelve Babcock & Wilcox boilers. The turbines were designed to produce a total of 27,000 shaft horsepower (20,134 kW), which was theoretically enough to attain her designed speed of 20 knots (23 mph; 37 km/h), but no figures from her speed trials are known to exist. She carried 1,844.5 tonnes (1,815.4 long tons) of coal, and an additional 267.2 tonnes (263.0 long tons) of fuel oil that was to be sprayed on the coal to increase its burn rate. At full capacity, she could steam for 4,200 nautical miles (7,800 km) at a speed of 10 knots (12 mph; 19 km/h).

Viribus Unitis mounted twelve 30.5-centimetre (12 in) Škoda 30.5 cm K10 guns in four triple turrets. Her secondary armament consisted of a dozen 15-centimetre (5.9 in) Škoda 15 cm K10 guns mounted in casemates amidships. Twelve 7-centimetre (2.8 in) Škoda K10 guns were mounted on open pivot mounts on the upper deck, above the casemates. Three more 7 cm K10 guns were mounted on the upper turrets for anti-aircraft duties. Four 21-inch (530 mm) submerged torpedo tubes were fitted, one each in the bow, stern and on each broadside; twelve torpedoes were carried.

== Service history ==
=== Archduke Franz Ferdinand's visit to Sarajevo ===
Archduke Franz Ferdinand of Austria travelled aboard Viribus Unitis in late June 1914 en route to Bosnia to observe military manoeuvres. On 25 June, he boarded the ship in Trieste Harbour and travelled to the mouth of the Neretva River, where he transferred to another vessel. On 30 June, two days after Ferdinand and his wife were assassinated by Gavrilo Princip in the Bosnian city of Sarajevo, Viribus Unitis transported their bodies back to Trieste.

=== World War I ===
Prior to the war, Viribus Unitis was assigned to the 1st Battleship Division of Austro-Hungarian Navy. During World War I, the battleship saw limited service due to the Otranto Barrage which prohibited Austro-Hungarian battleships from leaving the Adriatic sea. As a result, she hardly ever left Pola.

Viribus Unitis, along with her sister ships Tegetthoff, Prinz Eugen and the remainder of the Austro-Hungarian Navy, was mobilized on the eve of World War I to support the flight of SMS Goeben and Breslau. The two German ships were stationed in the Mediterranean and were attempting to break out of the strait of Messina, which was surrounded by enemy troops and vessels and make their way to Turkey. After the Germans successfully broke out of Messina, the navy was recalled. The fleet had by that time advanced as far south as Brindisi in south eastern Italy. Viribus Unitis also participated in the bombardment of the Italian city of Ancona in May 1915. Following these operations Viribus Unitis remained in Pola for most of the remainder of the war.

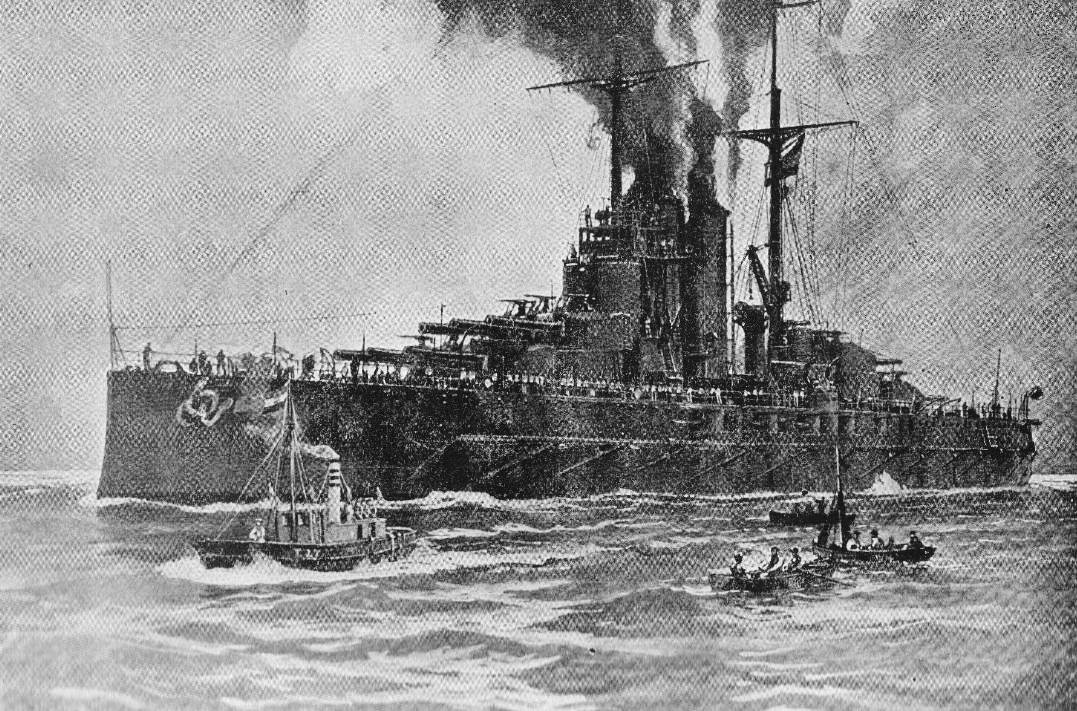
Viribus Unitis in 1914

Her tenure in Pola was livened up by a visit from the new Emperor Charles I on 15 December 1916 and another by Kaiser Wilhelm II on 12 December 1917 during his inspection of the German submarine base there. The Italians conducted eighty air raids on Pola between 1915 and 1917.

=== The Otranto Raid ===
By 1918, the new commander of the Austrian fleet, Konteradmiral Miklós Horthy, decided to conduct another attack on the Otranto Barrage to allow more German and Austro-Hungarian U-boats to safely get through the heavily defended strait. During the night of 8 June, Horthy left the naval base of Pola with Viribus Unitis and Prinz Eugen. The other two dreadnoughts, Szent István and Tegetthoff, along with one destroyer and six torpedo boats departed Pola on 9 June. At about 3:15 on the morning of 10 June, two Italian MAS boats, MAS 15 and MAS 21, spotted the Austrian fleet. The MAS platoon was commanded by Capitano di fregata Luigi Rizzo while the individual boats were commanded by Capo timoniere Armando Gori and Guardiamarina di complemento Giuseppe Aonzo respectively. Both boats successfully penetrated the escort screen and split to engage each of the dreadnoughts. MAS 21 attacked Tegetthoff, but her torpedoes failed. MAS 15 managed to hit Szent István with her torpedoes at about 3:25 am. Both boats were then chased away from the scene by the Austrian escort vessels.

Despite attempts to take the crippled Szent István into tow by Tegetthoff, the ship continued to sink and the attempt was abandoned. A few minutes after 6:00 am Szent István sank. Admiral Horthy, commander of the proposed attack, soon canceled the attack because he thought that the Italians had discovered his plan and ordered the ships to return to Pola. On the contrary, the Italians did not even discover that the Austrian dreadnoughts had departed Pola until later on 10 June when aerial reconnaissance photos revealed that they were no longer there. This was the last military operation that the Viribus Unitis was to take part in and she spent the rest of her career at port in Pola.

=== Italian attack and sinking ===
By October 1918 it had become clear that Austria-Hungary was facing defeat in the war. The Austrian government decided to give Viribus Unitis, along with much of the fleet, to the newly formed State of Slovenes, Croats and Serbs. This was considered preferential to handing the fleet to the Allies, as the new state had declared its neutrality. The transfer to the State of Slovenes, Croats and Serbs took place in the evening of 31 October. A minority of sources indicate that Viribus Unitis was renamed Jugoslavija during the afternoon she was in possession of the new state. There were proposals by the crew to rename her Frankopan, ostensibly after the Frankopan family or one of its members. Other sources detailing the transfer of control do not mention any change to her name. A document issued by the National Council of Slovenes, Croats and Serbs on sinking of its newly acquired ship refers to her as Viribus Unitis (without the "SMS" prefix).

Viribus Unitis sinking in Pola harbour after being mined

On 1 November 1918, two men of the Italian Navy, Raffaele Paolucci and Raffaele Rossetti, rode a primitive manned torpedo (nicknamed Mignatta or "leech") into the Austro-Hungarian naval base at Pola. They had sailed from an Italian port some time before, and were unaware of the transfer of the Austro-Hungarian fleet the previous day.

Travelling down the rows of Austrian battleships, the two men encountered Viribus Unitis at around 4:40 am. Rossetti placed one canister of TNT on the hull of the battleship, timed to explode at 6:30 am. He then flooded the second canister, sinking it on the harbour floor close to the ship. The men had no breathing sets, and therefore had to keep their heads above water. They were discovered and taken prisoner just after placing the explosives under the battleship's hull. Taken aboard Viribus Unitis, they informed the new captain of the battleship of what they had done but did not reveal the exact position of the explosives. Admiral Janko Vuković arranged for the two prisoners to be taken to Tegetthoff, and ordered Viribus Unitis to be evacuated. The explosion did not happen at 6:30 as predicted and Vuković returned to the ship with many sailors, mistakenly believing that the Italians had lied. The mines exploded at 6:44, sinking Viribus Unitis in 15 minutes. Vuković and 300–400 of her crew were killed in the sinking. The explosion of the second canister also sank the Austrian freighter Wien.

Paolucci and Rossetti were interned until the end of the war a few days later, and were honoured by the Kingdom of Italy with the Gold Medal of Military Valor.

== Commemorations ==
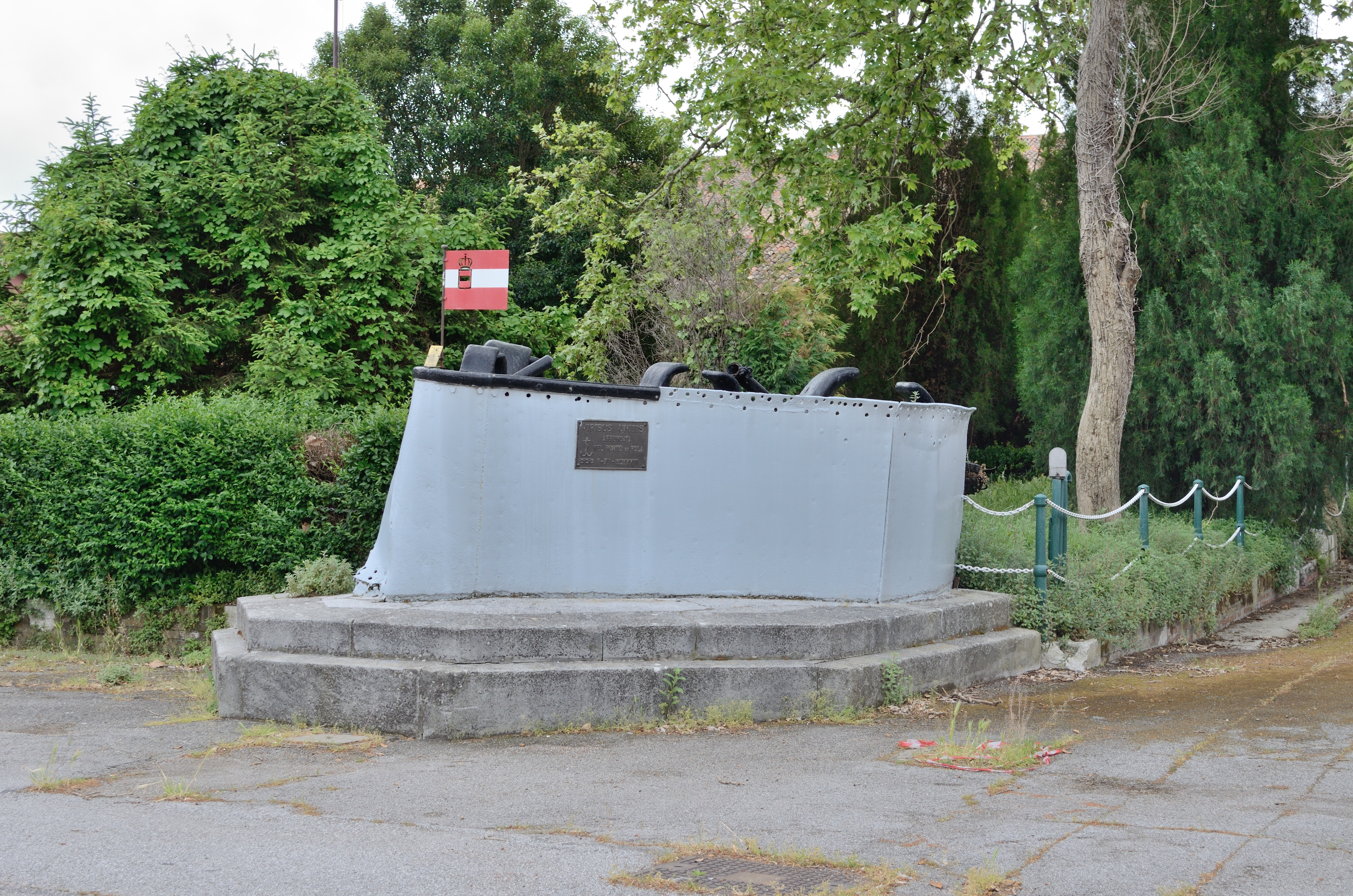
Bow of Viribus Unitis on display at the Venetian Arsenal

SMS Viribus Unitis was selected as the main motif of a high value collectors' coin: the Austrian SMS Viribus Unitis commemorative coin, minted on 13 September 2006. The obverse side shows the flagship Viribus Unitis as seen from the deck of an accompanying ship in the fleet. Two other ships of an older class can be seen in the background. The reverse of the coin is a tribute to the old Austro-Hungarian Imperial Navy, showing SMS Viribus Unitis from a front angle. A naval biplane circles overhead and a submarine surfaces in the foreground. The coin commemorates not only the ship Viribus Unitis, but also the three main arms of the Austro-Hungarian Navy in the First World War. The coin was the last of the series "Austria on the High Seas".

There is a cutaway model of Viribus Unitis in the Museum of Military History in Vienna. The model is at a scale of 1:25 and has a total length of 6 metres. It was built between 1913 and 1917 by eight craftsmen of the shipyard Stabilimento Tecnico Triestino.

Her bow is on display at the Venetian Arsenal.

== Bibliography ==
- Freivogel, Zvonimir (2014). "Potapanje bojnog broda Viribus Unitis u pulskoj luci 1. studenog 1918." [Sinking of the Battleship Viribus Unitis in the Port of Pula on 1 November 1918] (PDF). In Dobrić, Bruno (ed.). Carska i kraljevska mornarica u Puli i na Jadranu: od 1856. do 1918. godine [Imperial and Royal Navy in Pula and in the adriatic: From 1856 to 1918] (PDF) (in Croatian). Pula: Društvo za proučavanja prošlosti Carske i kraljevske Mornarice (k.u.k. Marine) Viribus unitis. pp. 208–219. ISBN 9789535622116.
- Greger, René (1976). Austro-Hungarian Warships of World War I. Allan. ISBN 9780711006232.
- Halpern, Paul G. (1995). A Naval History of World War I. Annapolis: Naval Institute Press. ISBN 978-1-55750-352-7. OCLC 57447525.
- Morton, Frederic (2001). Thunder at Twilight: Vienna 1913–1914. Da Capo Press. ISBN 978-0-306-81021-3.
- Sieche, Erwin F. (1985). "Austria-Hungary". In Gardiner, Robert; Gray, Randal (eds.). Conway's All the World's Fighting Ships 1906–1921. Annapolis: Naval Institute Press. ISBN 978-0-85177-245-5.
- Sieche, Erwin F. (1991). "S.M.S. Szent István: Hungaria's Only and Ill-Fated Dreadnought". Warship International. XXVII (2). Toledo, OH: International Warship Research Organization: 112–146. ISSN 0043-0374.
- Sokol, Anthony (1968). The Imperial and Royal Austro-Hungarian Navy. Annapolis: United States Naval Institute. OCLC 462208412.
- Sondhaus, Lawrence (2018). "The Battleship Viribus Unitis (1911)". In Taylor, Bruce (ed.). The World of the Battleship: The Lives and Careers of Twenty-One Capital Ships of the World's Navies, 1880–1990. Barnsley: Seaforth Publishing. ISBN 978-0870219061.
- Štambuk-Škalić, Marina; Matijević, Zlatko, eds. (2008). "Narodno vijeće Slovenaca, Hrvata i Srba u Zagrebu 1918–1919. (izabrani dokumenti)" [National Council of Slovenes, Croats and Serbs in Zagreb 1918–1919 (Selected Documents)]. Fontes: Izvori Za Hrvatsku Povijest (in Croatian). 14 (1). Zagreb: Croatian State Archives: 71–596. ISSN 1330-6804.
