= Italian frigate Carlo Bergamini (F 593) =

Bergamini-class frigates of the Italian Navy

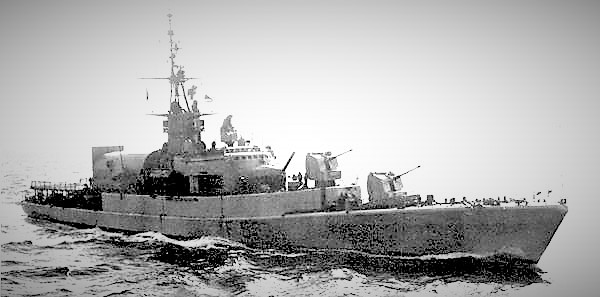
- Carlo Bergamini

History

Italy
- Name: Carlo Bergamini
- Namesake: Carlo Bergamini
- Builder: Stabilimento Tecnico Triestino
- Laid down: 19 July 1959
- Launched: 16 June 1960
- Commissioned: 23 June 1962
- Decommissioned: 1981
- Stricken: 1983
- Identification: Pennant number: F 593
- Motto: Con forza e fedeltà; (With strength and fidelity)
- Fate: Dismantled, 1983

General characteristics
- Class & type: Bergamini-class frigate
- Displacement: 1,410 t (1,390 long tons) standard; 1,650 t (1,620 long tons) full load
- Length: 86.5 m (283 ft 10 in) pp; 94.0 m (308 ft 5 in) overall
- Beam: 11.4 m (37 ft 5 in)
- Draught: 3.1 m (10 ft 2 in)
- Propulsion: 4 × diesels 16,000 bhp (12,000 kW); 2 × shafts
- Speed: 25 knots (46 km/h; 29 mph)
- Range: 3,000 nautical miles (5,600 km; 3,500 mi) at 18 knots (33 km/h; 21 mph)
- Complement: 163
- Sensors & processing systems: SPS-12 radar; SPQ-2 navigational radar; RTN-10 fire-control radar
- Electronic warfare & decoys: SPR-A ESM system
- Armament: 2 × 76 mm (3 in) DP guns; 1 × ASW mortar; 2 × triple 324 mm (12.8 in) torpedo tubes
- Aircraft carried: 1 × AB-212ASW helicopter
- Aviation facilities: Single hangar and helipad

Carlo Bergamini (F 593) was the lead ship of the Bergamini-class frigate of the Italian Navy.

== Construction and career ==
She was laid down on 19 July 1959 and launched on 16 June 1960 by Stabilimento Tecnico Triestino. She was commissioned on 23 June 1962.

Carlo Bergamini was decommissioned in 1981 and dismantled in 1983.

== Gallery ==
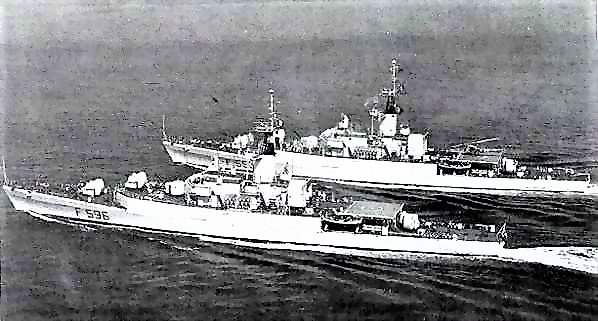
Luigi Rizzo and Carlo Bergamini underway in 1960s.
