= Giuseppe Aonzo =

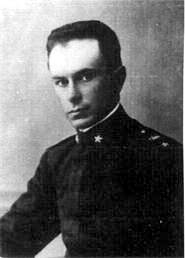
Giuseppe Aonzo (1887–1954)

Giuseppe Aonzo (1887–1954) was an Italian sailor famous for his involvement in the Battle of Premuda.

== Life and career ==
Born in Savona he became a sailor as a teenager, in 1907 he was drafted into the Italian Navy (Regia Marina), after two years he was discharged from service and he started his career as sea captain. In 1915 with the entry of Italy into World War I he was called again in service as a naval officer and was soon named ensign.

=== Premuda ===
In the night between 9 and 10 June 1918 he was the captain of a MAS (torpedo boat) and was patrolling together with Luigi Rizzo in the Adriatic Sea, near the shore of modern-day Croatia, when a large Austrian Hungarian fleet was discovered. Luigi Rizzo's MAS fired a torpedo that hit and sunk SMS Szent István, Aonzo fired his torpedoes against SMS Tegetthoff that was hit but the torpedoes didn't explode. For this action Aonzo received the Gold Medal of Military Valor and promotion to Sottotenente di Vascello

=== Later life ===
In 1919 Aonzo left the navy and became the captain of various merchant ship. In 1940 he was recalled to service as a navy officer and served as captain of various merchant ship used for military transports. In 1945 he returned to his job as ship captain of merchant ships.
