= SMS Szent István =

Austro-Hungarian dreadnought battleship

Coordinates: 44°12′07″N 14°27′05″E

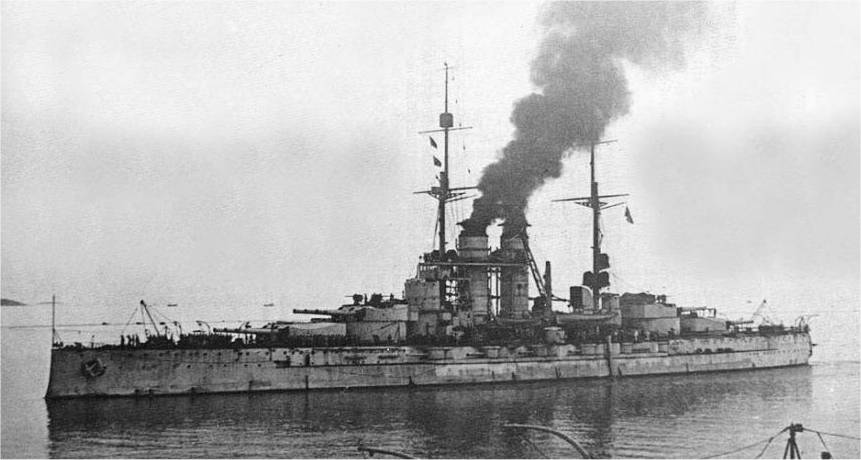
- SMS Szent István in the Fažana Strait

History

Austria-Hungary
- Name: Szent István
- Namesake: Saint Stephen I of Hungary
- Builder: Ganz–Danubius, Fiume
- Cost: 60,600,000 Krone
- Laid down: 29 January 1912
- Launched: 17 January 1914
- Sponsored by: Archduchess Maria Theresa of Austria
- Commissioned: 13 December 1915
- Fate: Sunk by the Italian torpedo boat MAS-15 during breakout attempt, 10 June 1918

General characteristics
- Class & type: Tegetthoff-class battleship
- Displacement: 20,008 t (19,692 long tons) (standard); 21,689 t (21,346 long tons) (deep load)
- Length: 152.18 m (499 ft 3 in)
- Beam: 28 m (91 ft 10 in)
- Draught: 8.6 m (28 ft 3 in)
- Installed power: 12 Babcock & Wilcox boilers; 26,000 shp (19,388 kW)
- Propulsion: 2 shafts; 2 steam turbines
- Speed: 20 knots (37 km/h; 23 mph)
- Range: 4,200 nmi (7,800 km; 4,800 mi) at 10 knots (19 km/h; 12 mph)
- Complement: 1,094
- Armament: 4 × triple 30.5 cm (12 in) guns; 12 × single 15 cm (5.9 in) guns; 12 × single 66 mm (2.6 in) guns; 3 × single 66 mm AA guns; 4 × 533 mm (21 in) torpedo tubes
- Armour: Waterline belt: 150–280 mm (5.9–11.0 in); Deck: 30–48 mm (1.2–1.9 in); Turrets and Conning tower: 60–280 mm (2.4–11.0 in); Bulkheads: 120–180 mm (4.7–7.1 in)

SMS Szent István (His Majesty's Ship Saint Stephen) (Note: "SMS" stands for "Seiner Majestät Schiff ", or "His Majesty's Ship" in German.) was the last of four Tegetthoff-class dreadnought battleships built for the Austro-Hungarian Navy. Szent István was the only ship of her class to be built within the Hungarian part of the Austro-Hungarian Empire, a concession made to the Hungarian government in return for its support for the 1910 and 1911 naval budgets which funded the Tegetthoff class. She was built at the Ganz-Danubius shipyard in Fiume (modern Rijeka), where she was laid down in January 1912. She was launched two years later in 1914, but Szent István's construction was delayed due to the smaller shipyards in Fiume, and further delayed by the outbreak of World War I in July 1914. She was finally commissioned into the Austro-Hungarian Navy in December 1915.

Armed with a main battery of twelve 30.5 cm (12.0 in) guns in four triple turrets, Szent István was assigned to the 1st Battleship Division of the Austro-Hungarian Navy upon her commissioning. Alongside the other ships of her class, she was stationed out of the Austro-Hungarian naval base at Pola. Szent István's commissioning into the fleet came too late for her to participate in the Bombardment of Ancona following Italy's declaration of war on Austria-Hungary in May 1915, and she saw little combat for the rest of the war due to the Otranto Barrage, which prevented the Austro-Hungarian Navy from leaving the Adriatic Sea.

In June 1918, in a bid to ensure safer passage for German and Austro-Hungarian U-boats through the Strait of Otranto, the Austro-Hungarian Navy attempted to break the Barrage. This attack was to be spearheaded by all four ships of the Tegetthoff class but was abandoned after Szent István and her sister ship, Tegetthoff, were attacked by Italian motor torpedo boats on the morning of 10 June. While Tegetthoff was unharmed, Szent István was struck by two torpedoes launched from MAS-15, and capsized roughly three hours later off the island of Premuda. She is the only battleship whose sinking was filmed during World War I.

The ship's wreck was located in the mid-1970s by the Yugoslav Navy. She lies upside down at a depth of 66 metres (217 ft). Her bow broke off when it hit the seabed while the stern was still afloat, but is immediately adjacent to the rest of the heavily encrusted hull. She is a protected site of the Croatian Ministry of Culture.

== Background ==
Before the construction of Szent István and the other three ships of the Tegetthoff class, most of Austria-Hungary's battleships had been designed for the defense of the Empire's coastline. During the 19th-century, sea power had not been a priority in Austrian foreign policy. As a result, the Austro-Hungarian Navy had little public interest or support. However, the appointment of Archduke Franz Ferdinand – heir to the Austro-Hungarian throne and a prominent and influential supporter of naval expansion – to the position of admiral in September 1902 greatly increased the importance of the Navy in the eyes of both the general public and the Austrian and Hungarian Parliaments. Franz Ferdinand's interest in naval affairs were largely motivated from his belief that a strong navy would be necessary to compete with Italy, which he viewed as Austria-Hungary's greatest regional threat.

In 1904, the Austro-Hungarian Navy began an expansion program intended to equal that of the other Great Powers of Europe. This naval expansion program coincided with the establishment of the Austrian Naval League in September 1904 and the appointment of Vice-Admiral Rudolf Montecuccoli to the posts of Commander-in-Chief of the Navy (German: Marinekommandant) and Chief of the Naval Section of the War Ministry (German: Chef der Marinesektion) in October that same year. After Montecuccoli's appointment, the Admiral worked to pursue the efforts championed by his predecessor, Admiral Hermann von Spaun, and pushed for a greatly expanded and modernized navy.

The origins of Szent István and the Tegetthoff class can also be found in developments in the first decade of the 20th century which greatly increased the importance of sea power to the Austro-Hungarian Empire. Between 1906 and 1907, railroads linking Trieste and the Dalmatian coastline to the interior of the Empire had been constructed through Austria's Alpine passes. Additionally, lower tariffs on the port of Trieste allowed for a rapid expansion of the city and a similar growth in Austria-Hungary's merchant marine. As Austria-Hungary became more connected to naval affairs than in past decades, a new line of battleships would be necessary to match the Empire's growing naval interests.

Szent István and her sister ships were first envisioned in the middle of a heated naval arms race between Austria-Hungary and its nominal ally, Italy. Since the Battle of Lissa in 1866, Italy's Regia Marina was considered the most-important naval power in the region which Austria-Hungary measured itself against, often unfavorably. The disparity between the Austro-Hungarian and Italian navies had existed since the unification of Italy; in the late 1880s Italy had the third-largest fleet in the world, behind the French Republic's Navy and the British Royal Navy. While the disparity between Italian and Austro-Hungarian naval strength had been somewhat equalized with the Russian Imperial Navy and the German Kaiserliche Marine surpassing the Italian Navy in 1893 and in 1894, Italy had once again regained the initiative by the turn of the century. In 1903, the year before Montecuccoli's appointment, Italy had 18 battleships in commission or under construction compared to 6 Austro-Hungarian battleships.

Following the construction of the final two Regina Elena-class battleships in 1903, the Italian Navy elected to construct a series of large cruisers rather than additional battleships. Furthermore, a major scandal involving the Terni steel works' armor contracts led to a government investigation that postponed several naval construction programs for three years. These delays meant that the Italian Navy would not initiate construction of another battleship until 1909, and provided the Austro-Hungarian Navy an opportunity to even the disparity between the two fleets. The construction of Szent István and her sister ships can thus be viewed in the context of the naval rivalry between Austria-Hungary and Italy, with the ship playing a role in a larger attempt by Austria-Hungary to compete with Italy's naval power.

=== Austro-Italian naval arms race ===
The revolution in naval technology created by the launch of the British HMS Dreadnought in 1906 and the Anglo-German naval arms race that followed had a tremendous impact on the development of future battleships around the world, including Szent István. Dreadnought, armed with ten large-caliber guns, was the first of a revolutionary new standard of "all-big-gun" battleships that rendered pre-dreadnought battleships obsolete. As a result, the value of older battleships declined rapidly in the years after 1906. This development gave Austria-Hungary the opportunity to make up for neglecting its navy in past years. Furthermore, Austria-Hungary's improved financial situation following the Austro-Hungarian Compromise of 1867 were beginning to reflect in the form of larger budgets being allocated to the Empire's armed forces. Political will also existed to construct Austria-Hungary's own dreadnought battleship, as both Archduke Ferdinand and Admiral Montecuccoli were supportive of constructing a new class of modern battleships. As a result, by 1908 the stage was set for the creation of Szent István and the Tegetthoff class.

Shortly after assuming command as Chief of the Navy, Montecuccoli drafted his first proposal for a modern Austrian fleet in the spring of 1905. While these plans were ambitious and included 12 battleships, none of the ships were near the eventual size of Szent István. Additional proposals came from outside the Naval Section of the War Ministry. Two proposals from Slovenian politician Ivan Šusteršič, and the Austrian Naval League in 1905 and 1909 included battleships which approached the size of Szent István. While Šusteršič's plan lacked the large-caliber guns that would later be found on Szent István, the plans submitted by the Austrian Naval League three dreadnoughts of 19,000 tonnes (18,700 long tons), similar to Szent István's eventual displacement of 20,000 t (19,684 long tons). These plans were justified by the League by pointing out that newer battleships were necessary to protect Austria-Hungary's growing merchant marine, and that Italian naval spending was twice that of Austria-Hungary's.

Following the construction of Austria-Hungary's last class of pre-dreadnought battleships, the Radetzky class, Montecuccoli submitted a proposal which would include the first design for Szent István. With the threat of war with Italy from the Bosnian Crisis in 1908 fresh in the minds of the Austro-Hungarian military, Montecuccoli delivered a memorandum to Emperor Franz Joseph I in January 1909 proposing an enlarged Austro-Hungarian Navy consisting of 16 battleships, 12 cruisers, 24 destroyers, 72 seagoing torpedo boats, and 12 submarines. The most notable change in this memorandum compared to Monteccucoli's previous draft from 1905 was the inclusion of four additional dreadnought battleships with a displacement of 20,000 tonnes (19,684 long tons) at load. One of these ships would eventually become Szent István.

== Plans and budget ==
Montecuccoli's memorandum would eventually be leaked to Italian newspapers just three months after obtaining approval from Emperor Franz Joseph I. The Italian reaction to the Austro-Hungarian plans was swift, and in June 1909, the Italian dreadnought battleship Dante Alighieri was laid down at the naval shipyard in Castellammare di Stabia.

While Dante Alighieri was being worked on in Italy, Austria-Hungary's own plans for Szent István and the other ships of her class remained on paper. Funding necessary to begin construction was not to be had either, due to the collapse of Sándor Wekerle's government in Budapest. This left the Hungarian Diet without a prime minister for nearly a year. With no government in Budapest to pass a budget, the money necessary to pay for Szent István could not be obtained. As a result, the largest shipbuilding enterprises in Austria-Hungary, the Witkowitz Ironworks and the Škoda Works, offered to begin construction on three Tegetthoff-class dreadnoughts at their own financial risk, in return for assurances that the Austro-Hungarian government would purchase the battleships as soon as funds were available. After negotiations which involved the Austro-Hungarian joint ministries of foreign affairs, war and finance, the offer was agreed to by Montecuccoli, but the number of dreadnoughts constructed under this arrangement was reduced to two. In his memoirs, former Austrian Field Marshal and Chief of the General Staff Conrad von Hötzendorf wrote that due to his belief that a war with Italy in the near future was likely, construction on the battleships should begin as soon as possible. He also worked to secure agreements to sell the ships to, in his words, a "reliable ally" (which only Germany could claim to be) should the budget crisis in Budapest fail to be settled quickly.

=== Outline ===
Although smaller than the contemporary dreadnought and super-dreadnought battleships of the German Kaiserliche Marine and the British Royal Navy, Szent István was part of the first class of its type in the Mediterranean and Adriatic Seas. Szent István and her sister ships were described by former Austro-Hungarian naval officer Anthony Sokol in his book The Imperial and Royal Austro-Hungarian Navy as "excellent ships", and she was acknowledged as one of the most powerful battleships in the region. The design of the battleship also signaled a change in Austro-Hungarian naval policy, as she was capable of far more than coastal defense or patrolling the Adriatic Sea. Indeed, Szent István and her sister ships were so well received that when the time came to plan for the replacement of Austria-Hungary's old Monarch-class coastal defense ships, the navy elected to simply take the layout of her class and enlarge them to have a slightly greater tonnage and larger main guns.

=== Funding ===
The cost to construct Szent István was enormous by the standards of the Austro-Hungarian Navy. While the Habsburg-class, Erzherzog Karl-class, and the Radetzky-class battleships cost the navy roughly 18, 26, and 40 million krone per ship, Szent István was projected to cost over 60 million krone. Under the previous budgets for 1907 and 1908, the navy had been allocated some 63.4 and 73.4 million krone, which at the time was considered an inflated budget due to the construction of two Radetzkys. Montecuccoli worried that the general public and the legislatures in Vienna and Budapest would reject the need for a ship as expensive as Szent István, especially so soon after the political crisis in Budapest. The dramatic increase in spending meant that in 1909 the navy spent some 100.4 million krone, a huge sum at the time. This was done in order to rush the completion of the Radetzky-class battleships, though the looming construction of three other dreadnoughts in addition to Szent István meant the Austro-Hungarian Navy would likely have to ask the government for a yearly budget much higher than 100 million krone. A secret agreement to fund construction of Viribus Unitis and Tegetthoff, Szent István's sister ships, was struck with the Rothschild family in Austria, who owned the Witkowitz Ironworks, the Creditanstalt Bank, and had significant assets in both the Škoda Works and the Stabilimento Tecnico Triestino. Archduke Franz Ferdinand personally courted Albert Salomon Anselm von Rothschild to obtain his family's monetary support until the government could buy Szent István's two older sister ships.

Facing potential backlash over constitutional concerns that constructing two Tegetthoff-class battleships committed Austria-Hungary to spend roughly 120 million Krone without prior approval by either the Austrian Reichsrat or the Diet of Hungary, the deal remained secret. The agreement was ultimately leaked to the public in April 1910 by the Arbeiter-Zeitung, the newspaper of Austria's Social Democratic Party. However, by the time the Arbeiter-Zeitung broke the story, the plans had already been finalized on the Tegetthoff-class battleship and construction on two of Szent István's sister ships was about to begin.

== General characteristics ==
Designed by naval architect Siegfried Popper, Szent István had an overall length of 152.18 metres (499 ft 3 in), with a beam of 28 metres (91 ft 10 in) and a draught of 8.6 metres (28 ft 3 in) at deep load. She was designed to displace 20,000 tonnes (19,684 long tons; 22,046 short tons) at load, but at full combat load she displaced 21,689 tonnes (21,346 long tons; 23,908 short tons). Szent István's hull was built with a double bottom, 1.22 metres (4 ft 0 in) deep, with a reinforced inner bottom that consisted of two layers of 25-millimetre (1 in) plates.

The hull design was intended by Popper to protect the battleship from naval mines, though it ultimately failed Szent István when she was sunk by a torpedo in June 1918. The hull also failed for her sister ship Viribus Unitis when she was sunk by a mine in November of that same year. Szent István also featured two 2.74-metre (9 ft 0 in) Barr and Stroud optical rangefinder posts on both the starboard and port sides for the secondary guns of the battleship. These rangefinders were equipped with an armored cupola, which housed an 8-millimetre (0.31 in) Schwarzlose M.07/12 anti-aircraft machine gun. Unlike her sister ships, Szent István was not equipped with torpedo nets.

=== Propulsion ===
Szent István possessed two shafts and two AEG-Curtis steam turbines, which were housed in a separate engine-room and powered by twelve Babcock & Wilcox boilers. This differed from the four shaft arrangement present on her three sister ships. Szent István's propulsion system was designed to produce a total of 26,400 or 27,000 shaft horsepower (19,686 or 20,134 kW), which was theoretically enough to attain a maximum designed speed of 20 knots (37 km/h; 23 mph). It was reported during the speed trials of her sister ship Tegetthoff that she attained a top speed of 19.75 knots (36.58 km/h; 22.73 mph), though Szent István's actual top speed is unknown as the official sea trial data and records for all ships of the Tegetthoff class were lost after the war. Szent István also carried 1,844.5 tonnes (1,815.4 long tons; 2,033.2 short tons) of coal, and an additional 267.2 tonnes (263.0 long tons; 294.5 short tons) of fuel oil that was to be sprayed on the coal to increase its burn rate. At full capacity, Szent István could steam for 4,200 nautical miles (7,800 km; 4,800 mi) at a speed of 10 knots (19 km/h; 12 mph).

The new Babcock & Wilcox boilers of Szent István were 48 tonnes heavier than the older type Yarrow boilers installed on the sister ships, however they were more efficient than the old boilers. The new boilers had a huge advantage of being able to maintain top speed for up to eight hours, compared with only two hours on their sister ships.

=== Armament ===
Diagram of Szent István's main armament

Constructed at the Škoda Works in Plzeň, Bohemia, Szent István's main battery was one of the few pieces of the battleship to be built outside of Hungary. These guns consisted of twelve 45-calibre 30.5-centimetre (12 in) Škoda K10 guns mounted in four triple turrets. Two turrets each were mounted forward and aft of the ship's main superstructure in a superfiring pair. The implementation of triple turrets aboard Szent István came about for two reasons: the need to ensure the ship had a more-compact design and smaller displacement to conform to Austro-Hungarian naval doctrine and budget constraints, and to counter the implementation of triple turrets on the Italian Dante Alighieri. Having three guns on each turret rather than two made it possible to deliver a heavier broadside than other dreadnoughts of a similar size and meant a shorter citadel and better weight distribution.

Szent István carried a secondary armament which consisted of a dozen 50-calibre 15-centimetre (5.9 in) Škoda K10 guns mounted in casemates amidships. Additionally, eighteen 50-calibre 7-centimetre (2.8 in) Škoda K10 guns were mounted on open pivot mounts on the upper deck, above the casemates. Three more 7-centimetre (2.8 in) Škoda K10 guns were mounted on the upper turrets for anti-aircraft duties. Two additional 8-millimetre (0.31 in) Schwarzlose M.07/12 anti-aircraft machine guns were mounted atop the armored cupolas of her rangefinders. Szent István was also equipped with two 7-centimetre (2.8 in) Škoda G. L/18 landing guns, and two 47-millimetre (1.9 in) Škoda SFK L/44 S guns for use against small and fast vessels such as torpedo boats and submarines. Furthermore, she also fitted with four 533-millimetre (21.0 in) submerged torpedo tubes, one each in the bow, the stern, and each side. Complementing these torpedo tubes, Szent István usually carried twelve torpedoes.

=== Armor ===
Szent István was protected at the waterline with an armor belt which measured 280 millimetres (11 in) thick in the central citadel, where the most-important parts of the ship were located. This armor belt was located between the midpoints of the fore and aft barbettes, and thinned to 150 millimetres (5.9 in) further towards the bow and stern, but did not reach either. It was continued to the bow by a small patch of 110–130-millimetre (4–5 in) armor. The upper armor belt had a maximum thickness of 180 millimetres (7.1 in), but it thinned to 110 millimetres (4.3 in) from the forward barbette all the way to the bow. The casemate armor was also 180 millimetres (7.1 in) thick.

The sides of the main gun turrets, barbettes, and main conning tower were protected by 280 millimetres (11 in) of armor, except for the turret and conning tower roofs which were 60 to 150 millimetres (2 to 6 in) thick. The thickness of the decks ranged from 30 to 48 millimetres (1 to 2 in) in two layers. The underwater protection system consisted of the extension of the double-bottom upwards to the lower edge of the waterline armor belt, with a thin 10-millimetre (0.4 in) plate acting as the outermost bulkhead. It was backed by a torpedo bulkhead that consisted of two 25-millimetre plates. The total thickness of this system was only 1.60 metres (5 ft 3 in) which made Szent István incapable of containing a torpedo warhead detonation or mine explosion without rupturing. This design flaw would ultimately prove to be fatal for her and her sister ship Viribus Unitis.

== Construction ==
Film about the construction of Szent István in the Ganz-Danubius shipyard in Fiume in 1912

Montecuccoli's plans for the construction of Szent István and her sister ships earned the approval of Emperor Franz Joseph I in January 1909, and by April plans for the design, construction, and financing for the battleships had been laid out. For a full year, the Austro-Hungarian Navy attempted to keep the looming construction of the first two battleships a state secret. This did not prevent rumors from circulating across Europe of two dreadnought battleships being constructed in Austria-Hungary. The French Naval Attaché in Vienna complained to Paris in 1910 of extensive secrecy within the Austro-Hungarian Navy, which manifested itself in several ways. Among these were a ban on photography in the Pola, future home port of Szent István, and near-constant observation by the Austro-Hungarian police.

The Admiralty considered the rumored construction of the battleships "as a concealed addition to the German fleet", and interpreted the ships as Austria-Hungary's way of repaying Germany for her diplomatic support during the former's annexation of Bosnia in 1908. During the spring and summer of 1909, the United Kingdom was locked in a heated naval arms race with Germany which led the Royal Navy to look upon the battleship as a ploy by German Grand Admiral Alfred von Tirpitz to outpace British naval construction, rather than the latest development in Austria-Hungary's own naval arms race with Italy. The Admiralty's concerns regarding the true purpose of the Tegetthoff class was so great that a British spy was dispatched to Berlin when Montecuccoli sent an officer from the Naval Section of the War Ministry to obtain recommendations from Tirpitz regarding the design and layout of the battleship. These concerns continued to grow and in April 1909, British Ambassador Fairfax Leighton Cartwright asked Austro-Hungarian Foreign Minister Alois Lexa von Aehrenthal about the rumored battleships. Aehrenthal denied the construction of any dreadnoughts, but admitted that plans to construct a new battleship class were being considered. In an attempt to assure Cartwright that Austria-Hungary was not constructing any ships for the German Navy, Aehrenthal justified any naval expansion as being necessary to secure Austria-Hungary's strategic interests in the Mediterranean. At the time, the potential that Austria-Hungary was constructing a class of dreadnought battleships was widely regarded among the British press, public, and politicians as a provocation on the part of Germany. Neither the Admiralty's suspicions, nor those of some politicians, managed to convince Parliament that the German government was attempting to use the battleships to escalate Germany and Britain's already contentious naval arms race however. When Winston Churchill was appointed First Lord of the Admiralty in 1911, he rejected any potential Austro-German collusion regarding the battleship.

Roughly a year after Szent István's plans were drafted, Arbeiter-Zeitung, the Austrian Social Democratic Party newspaper, reported the details of the battleship to the general public. The Christian Social Party, supportive of the construction of Szent István and her sister ships, and operating on the advice of the navy, published in its own newspaper, Reichspost, that the secret project to construct the battleship and the related financial agreements to fund it were true. The Reichspost lobbied in support of the project, citing Austria-Hungary's national security concerns with an Italian dreadnought already under construction. When the story broke, Archduke Ferdinand also worked to build public support for the construction of the battleships, and the Austrian Naval League did the same.

=== Assembly and commissioning ===
1st part: The launching of the nearly-finished Szent István, 2nd part: video about the test of the battleship

Szent István would be the fourth and last ship of her class, was laid down in Fiume by Ganz-Danubius on 29 January 1912. Fiume was the only large Hungarian shipyard in Croatia. Ganz-Danubius had been awarded the contract to build the battleship in return for the Hungarian government agreeing to the 1910 and 1911 naval budgets which funded the Tegetthoff class. However, this contract involved great expense by the Hungarian government, as Fiume had hitherto only built smaller merchant ships for merchant firms such as the Austrian Lloyd. The shipyards in the city therefore had to be themselves refitted and enlarged for the building of a vessel as large as Szent István.

The final package of the budget agreement which funded Szent István included provisions which ensured that while the armor and guns of the battleship were to be constructed within Austria, the electrical wiring and equipment aboard Szent István was to be assembled in Hungary. Additionally, half of all ammunition and shells for the guns of the ship would be purchased in Austria, while the other half was to be bought in Hungary. Construction on Szent István was delayed by the size of Fiume's shipyards and as a result, she was not launched until 17 January 1912. It was customary for either the Emperor or his heir to be present at the launching of a major warship, but Emperor Franz Joseph I was too feeble and his heir, Archduke Franz Ferdinand, refused to be there as a consequence of his anti-Hungarian attitudes. Franz Joseph I thus sent a telegram of congratulations which negated the snub offered by his heir. During the launching itself there was an accident when the starboard anchor had to be dropped to prevent the ship from hitting a ship carrying spectators, but the anchor chain had not been shackled to the ship and it struck two dockworkers, killing one and crushing the arm of the other.

Originally referred to as "Battleship VII", discussion began over what to name the battleship while it was under construction in Fiume. The Naval Section of the War Ministry initially proposed naming the battleship Hunyadi. Newspapers within Austria reported during construction that one of the ships was to be named Kaiser Franz Joseph I, though it was later revealed the navy had no intentions of renaming the cruiser which already bore the Emperor's name. Archduke Franz Ferdinand proposed Laudon for the ship in honor of the Austrian field marshal. Emperor Franz Joseph I ultimately decided to name her Szent István, after the 11th-century saint Stephen I, the first King of Hungary.

== Career ==
Film about the artillery exercises of Szent István in 1915

Following France and Britain's declarations of war on Austria-Hungary on 11 and 12 August 1914 respectively, the French Admiral Augustin Boué de Lapeyrère was issued orders to close off Austro-Hungarian shipping at the entrance to the Adriatic Sea and to engage any Austro-Hungarian ships his Anglo-French fleet came across. Lapeyrère chose to attack the Austro-Hungarian ships blockading Montenegro. The ensuing Battle of Antivari ended Austria-Hungary's blockade, and effectively placed the entrance of the Adriatic Sea firmly in the hands of Britain and France.

Following her launching, Szent István underwent sea trials before preparing to be commissioned into the Austro-Hungarian Navy in the autumn of 1915. Szent István's war logs record that on 18 November 1915, the battleship fired the first trial shots of her guns. Gunnery trials continued the following day and on 20 November, she underwent machinery trials in the Fasana Channel. These machinery trials continued on 22 November, where it was reported that Szent István had attained an unofficial speed of 21 knots (39 km/h; 24 mph). That same day, the battleship conducted torpedo launches from her four torpedo tubes, before anchoring at Fasana for the night. She returned to her home port of Pola on 25 November. Between 13 and 23 December, Szent István conducted further gunnery trials before finally being commissioned into the 1st Battleship Division of the Austro-Hungarian Navy.

=== 1916 ===
Szent István in Pola, 15 December 1915

Like the other three ships of theTegetthoff class, Szent István saw very little action during the course of the war, spending much of her time at her base at Pola. This general inactivity was partly caused by a fear of mines in the Adriatic. Grand Admiral Anton Johann Haus chose to keep most of his ships in port in order to use the Austro-Hungarian Navy as a fleet in being. This tactic earned sharp criticism from the Austro-Hungarian Army, the German Navy, and the Austro-Hungarian Foreign Ministry, but it also led to a far greater number of Entente naval forces being devoted to the Mediterranean and the Strait of Otranto. These could have been used elsewhere, such as against the Ottoman Empire during the Gallipoli Campaign.

The most-important factor contributing to Szent István spending most of her time at port may have been the lack of coal. Prior to the war, the United Kingdom had served as Austria-Hungary's primary source for coal. In the years before the war an increasing percentage of coal had come from mines in Germany, Virginia, and from domestic sources, but 75% of the coal purchased for the Austro-Hungarian Navy came from Britain. The outbreak of war meant that these sources, as well as those from Virginia, would no longer be available. Significant quantities of coal had been stockpiled before the war however, ensuring the Navy was capable of sailing out of port if need be. Even so, the necessity of ensuring the Navy's most-important ships such as Szent István had the coal she needed in the event of an Italian or French attack or a major offensive operation resulted in the dreadnoughts remaining at port unless circumstances necessitated their deployment at sea.

Commissioning into the Austro-Hungarian Navy too late to engage in the Bombardment of Ancona, Szent István was mostly relegated to defending Austria-Hungary's 1,130 nautical miles (2,090 km; 1,300 mi) coastline and 2,172.4 nautical miles (4,023.3 km; 2,500.0 mi) of island seaboard for the next three years. The lack of combat engagements, or even instances where Szent István left port, is exemplified by war logs. Between 1916 and 1918, the battleship rarely left the safety of the port except for gunnery practice in the nearby Fasana Strait. She only spent 54 days at sea during her 937 days in service and made only a single two-day trip to Pag Island. In total, only 5.7% of her life was spent at sea; and for the rest of the time she swung at anchor in Pola Harbour. Szent István saw so little action and so little time at sea that she was never drydocked to have her bottom cleaned.

=== 1917 ===
In January 1917 Emperor Karl I attended a military conference at Schloss Pless with German Kaiser Wilhelm II and members of the German Army and Navy. Haus, along with members of Austria-Hungary's naval command at Pola, accompanied the Emperor to this conference in order to discuss naval operations in the Adriatic and Mediterranean for 1917. Days after returning from this conference, Grand Admiral Haus died of pneumonia aboard his flagship Viribus Unitis on 8 February 1917. Newly crowned Emperor Karl I attended his funeral in Pola.

Despite his death, Haus' strategy of keeping the Austro-Hungarian Navy, and particularly its dreadnoughts, in port continued. By keeping Szent István and the Tegetthoff class battleships as a fleet in being, the Austro-Hungarian Navy would be able to continue to defend its lengthy coastline from naval bombardment or invasion by sea. The major ports of Trieste and Fiume would also remain protected. Furthermore, Italian ships stationed in Venice were effectively trapped by the positioning of the Austro-Hungarian fleet, preventing them from sailing south to join the bulk of the Entente forces at the Otranto Barrage.

Maximilian Njegovan was promoted to admiral and appointed Commander-in-Chief of the Navy. With Njegovan appointed to higher office, command of the First Battle Division, which comprised all four Tegetthoff-class ships, fell to Vice-Admiral Anton Willenik. Njegovan had previously voiced frustration watching the dreadnoughts he had commanded under Haus sit idle at port and upon taking command he had some 400,000 tons of coal at his disposal, but he chose to continue the strategy of his predecessor. Despite a change in command of both the Austro-Hungarian Navy and the Empire which it served, there would be no change in strategy regarding the employment of the Tegetthoff class in battle.

Having hardly ever ventured out of port except to conduct gunnery practice for the past two years, the most-significant moments Szent István saw while moored in Pola were inspections by dignitaries. The first such visit was conducted by Emperor Karl I on 15 December 1916. During this brief visit the Emperor inspected Pola's naval establishments and boarded Szent István. Karl I returned to Pola in June 1917 in the first formal imperial review of the Austro-Hungarian Navy since 1902. This visit was far grander than his previous trip to the naval base, with officers and sailors crowding the decks of their ships at port and the naval ensign of Austria-Hungary flying from every vessel. The Emperor received multiple cheers and salutes from the men at Pola, who had spent the past two years doing little more than shooting down Italian airplanes and airships. The third dignitary visit came during Kaiser Wilhelm II's inspection of Pola's German submarine base on 12 December 1917. During this trip, the German Emperor also took the time to inspect Szent István in similar fashion to his Austro-Hungarian counterpart. Aside from these visits, the only action the port of Pola and Szent István were subject to between the Bombardment of Ancona and the summer of 1918 were the more than eighty air raids conducted by the newly formed Italian Air Force.

=== 1918 ===
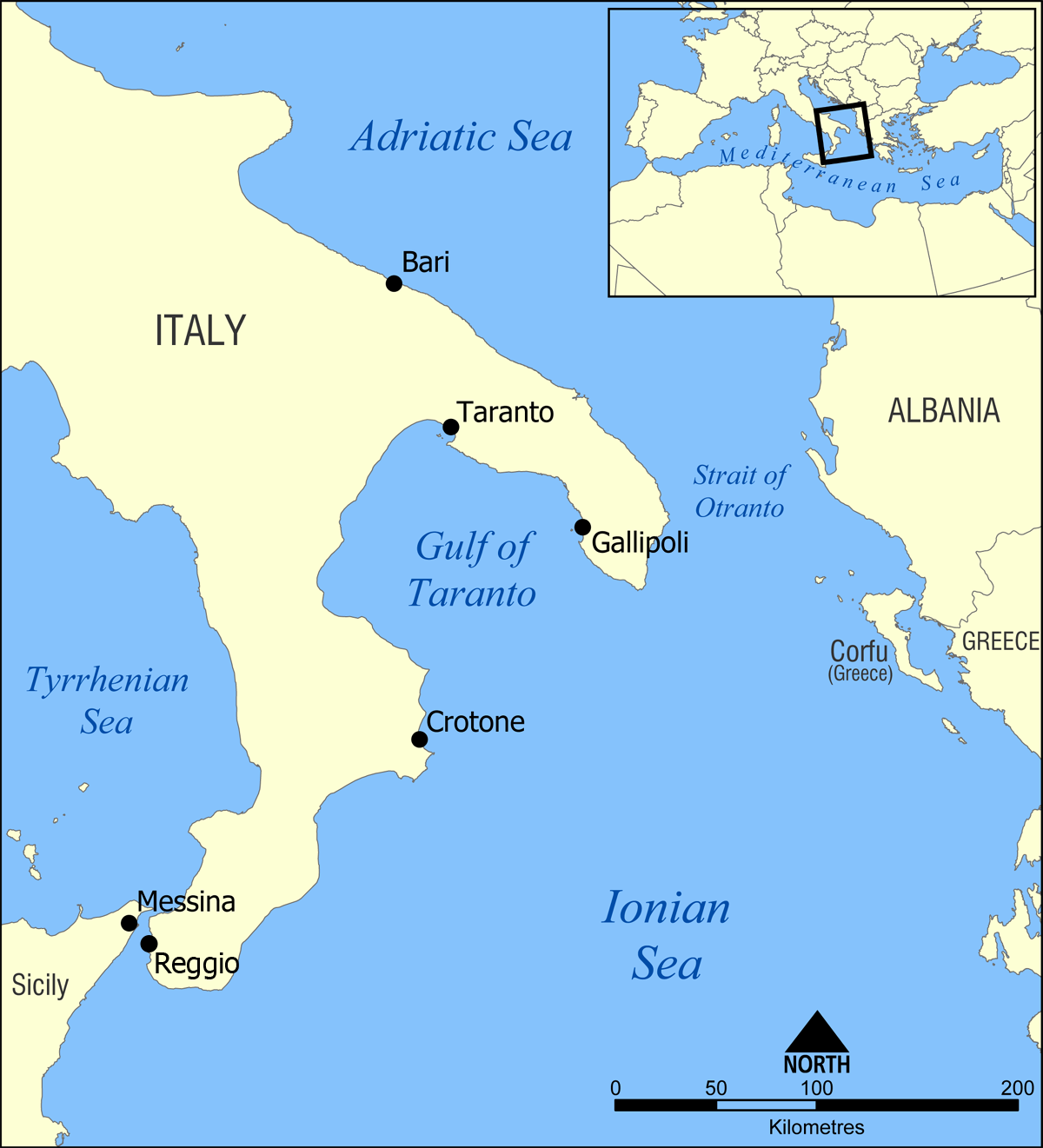
Map showing the location of the Straits of Otranto at the southern end of the Adriatic

Following the Cattaro Mutiny in February 1918, Admiral Njegovan was fired as Commander-in-Chief of the Navy, though at Njegovan's request it was announced that he was retiring. Miklós Horthy de Nagybánya, commander of Szent István's sister ship Prinz Eugen, was promoted to rear admiral and named Commander-in-Chief of the Fleet. Horthy's promotion was met with support among many members of the naval officer corps, who believed he would use Austria-Hungary's navy to engage the enemy. Horthy's appointment did however pose difficulties. His relatively young age alienated many of the senior officers, and Austria-Hungary's naval traditions included an unspoken rule that no officer could serve at sea under someone of inferior seniority. This meant that the heads of the First and Second Battle Squadrons, as well as the Cruiser Flotilla, all had to go into early retirement. Horthy also used his appointment to take the Austro-Hungarian fleet out of port for maneuvers and gunnery practice on a regular basis. The size of these operations were the largest Szent István had ever participated in at the time, and they were the largest the Austro-Hungarian Navy had seen since the outbreak of the war.

These gunnery and maneuver practices were conducted not only to restore order in the wake of several failed mutinies, but also to prepare the fleet for a major offensive operation. Horthy's strategic thinking differed from his two predecessors, and shortly after assuming command of the navy he resolved to undertake a major fleet action in order to address low morale and boredom, and make it easier for Austro-Hungarian and German U-boats to break out of the Adriatic into the Mediterranean. After several months of practice, Horthy concluded the fleet was ready for a major offensive at the beginning of June 1918.

==== Otranto Raid ====
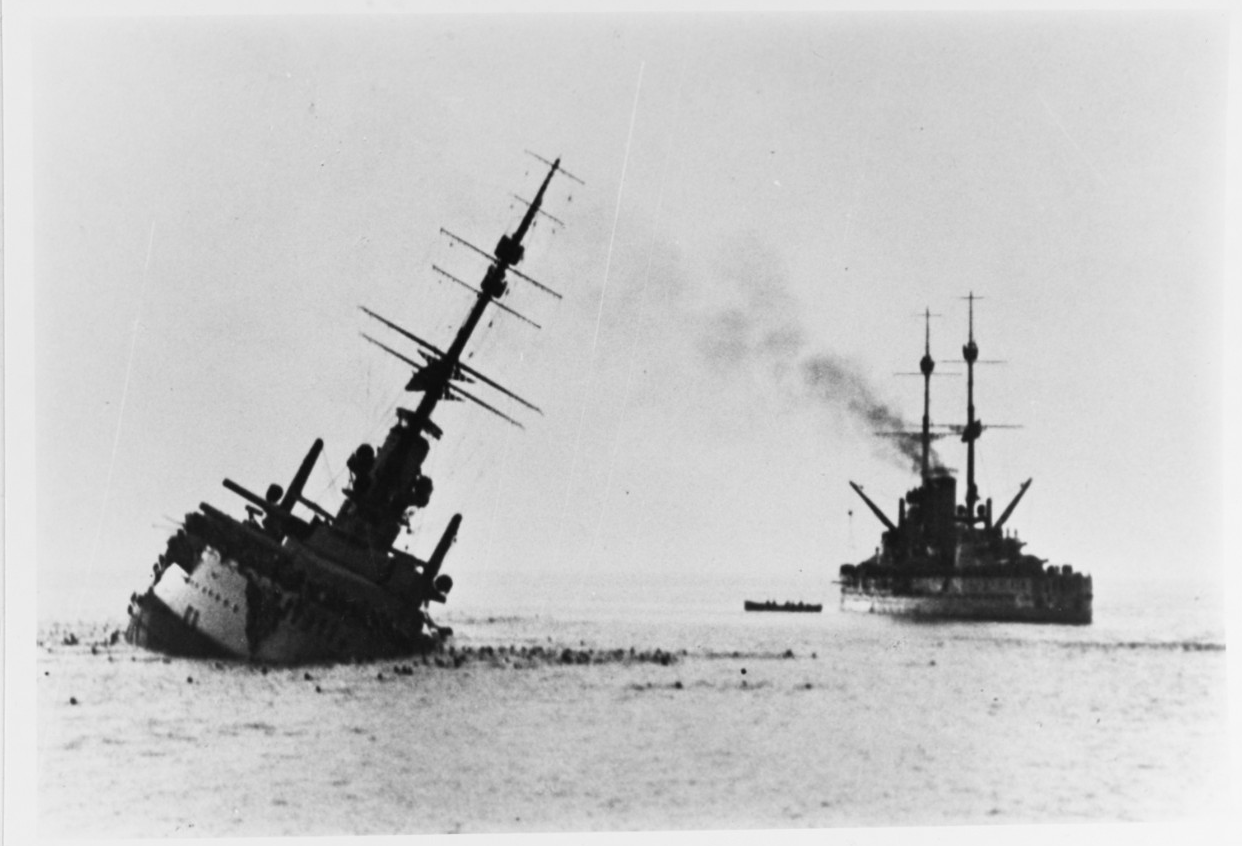
Szent István sinking in June 1918 after being struck by an Italian torpedo, Tegetthoff can be seen on the right

Horthy was determined to use the fleet to attack the Otranto Barrage. Planning to repeat his successful raid on the blockade in May 1917, Horthy envisioned a massive attack on the Allied forces with Szent István and the other three Tegetthoff class ships providing the largest component of the assault. They would be accompanied by the three ships of the Erzherzog Karl-class pre-dreadnoughts, the three Novara-class cruisers, the cruiser Admiral Spaun, four Tátra-class destroyers, and four torpedo boats. Submarines and aircraft would also be employed in the operation to hunt down enemy ships on the flanks of the fleet.

On 8 June 1918 Horthy took his flagship, Viribus Unitis, and Prinz Eugen south with the lead elements of his fleet. On the evening of 9 June, Szent István and Tegetthoff followed along with their own escort ships. Horthy's plan called for Novara and Helgoland to engage the Barrage with the support of the Tátra-class destroyers. Meanwhile, Admiral Spaun and Saida would be escorted by four of the fleet's many torpedo boats to Otranto to bombard Italian air and naval stations. The German and Austro-Hungarian submarines would be sent to Valona and Brindisi to ambush Italian, French, British, and American warships that sailed out to engage the Austro-Hungarian fleet, while seaplanes from Cattaro would provide air support and screen the ships' advance. The battleships, and in particular Szent István and the other Tegetthoffs, would use their firepower to destroy the Barrage and engage any Allied warships they ran across. Horthy hoped that the inclusion of these ships would prove to be critical in securing a decisive victory.

En route to the harbour at Islana, north of Ragusa, to rendezvous with Viribus Unitis and Prinz Eugen for the coordinated attack on the Otranto Barrage, Szent István and Tegetthoff attempted to make maximum speed in order to catch up to the rest of the fleet. In doing so, Szent István's turbines started to overheat and speed had to be reduced to 12 knots (22 km/h; 14 mph). When an attempt was made to raise more steam in order to increase to 16 knots (30 km/h; 18 mph) Szent István produced an excess of smoke. At about 3:15 am on 10 June, (Note: There is some debate on what was the exact time when the attack took place. Sieche 1991, pp. 127 and 131 states that the time was 3:15 am when Szent István was hit while Sokol 1968, p. 134 claims that the time was 3:30 am.) two Italian MAS boats, MAS-15 and MAS-21, spotted the smoke from the Austrian ships while returning from an uneventful patrol off the Dalmatian coast. The MAS unit was commanded by Capitano di corvetta Luigi Rizzo, who had sunk the obsolete Austro-Hungarian coastal defense ship SMS Wien in Trieste six months before. The individual boats were commanded by Capo timoniere Armando Gori and Guardiamarina di complemento Giuseppe Aonzo respectively. Both boats successfully penetrated the escort screen and split to engage each of the dreadnoughts. MAS-21 attacked Tegetthoff, but her torpedoes failed to hit the ship. MAS-15 fired her two torpedoes successfully at 3:25 am at Szent István. Both boats evaded any pursuit although MAS-15 had to discourage the Austro-Hungarian torpedo boat Tb 76 T by dropping depth charges in her wake. Tegetthoff, thinking that the torpedoes were fired by submarines, pulled out of the formation and started to zigzag to throw off any further attacks. She repeatedly fired on suspected submarine periscopes.

Film footage about the sinking of Szent István

Szent István was hit by two 45-centimetre (18 in) torpedoes abreast her boiler rooms. The aft boiler room quickly flooded and gave the ship a 10° list to starboard. Counterflooding of the portside trim cells and magazines reduced the list to 7°, but efforts to use collision mats to plug the holes failed. While the dreadnought steered for the nearby Bay of Brgulje at low speed, water continued to leak into the forward boiler room and eventually doused all but the two boilers on the port side. This killed the power for the pumps and only left enough electricity to run the lights. The turrets were trained to port in a futile effort to counter the list and their ready ammunition was thrown overboard. Upon returning to the formation at 4:45 am, Tegetthoff attempted to take Szent István in tow, which failed. Many of the crew members of the sinking battleship assembled on the deck to use their weight along with the turned turrets as a counterbalance, but the ship was taking on too much water. Szent István's chaplain performed one final blessing while the crew of Tegetthoff emerged onto her decks to salute the sinking ship. At 6:12 am, with the pumps unequal to the task, Szent István capsized off Premuda. 89 sailors and officers died in the sinking, 41 of them from Hungary. The low death toll can be partly attributed to the long amount of time it took for the battleship to sink, and the fact that all sailors with the Austro-Hungarian Navy had to learn to swim before entering active service. The captain of Szent István, Heinrich Seitz, was prepared to go down with his ship but was saved after being thrown off the bridge when she capsized.

Film footage and photographs exist of Szent István's last half-hour, taken by Linienschiffsleutnant Meusburger of Tegetthoff with his own camera and by an official film crew. The two films were later spliced together and exhibited in the United States after the war. The battleship's sinking was one of only two on the high seas to ever be filmed, the other being that of the British battleship HMS Barham during World War II. Proceeds from the film of Szent István capsizing were eventually used to feed children in Austria following the ending of the war.

Fearing further attacks by torpedo boats or destroyers from the Italian navy, and possible Allied dreadnoughts responding to the scene, Horthy believed the element of surprise had been lost and called off the attack. In reality, the Italian torpedo boats had been on a routine patrol, and Horthy's plan had not been betrayed to the Italians as he had feared. The Italians did not even discover that the Austrian dreadnoughts had departed from Pola until 10 June when aerial reconnaissance photos revealed that they were no longer there. Nevertheless, the loss of Szent István and the blow to morale it had on the navy forced Horthy to cancel his plans to assault the Otranto Barrage. The fleet returned to the base at Pola where it would remain for the rest of the war.

=== Legacy ===
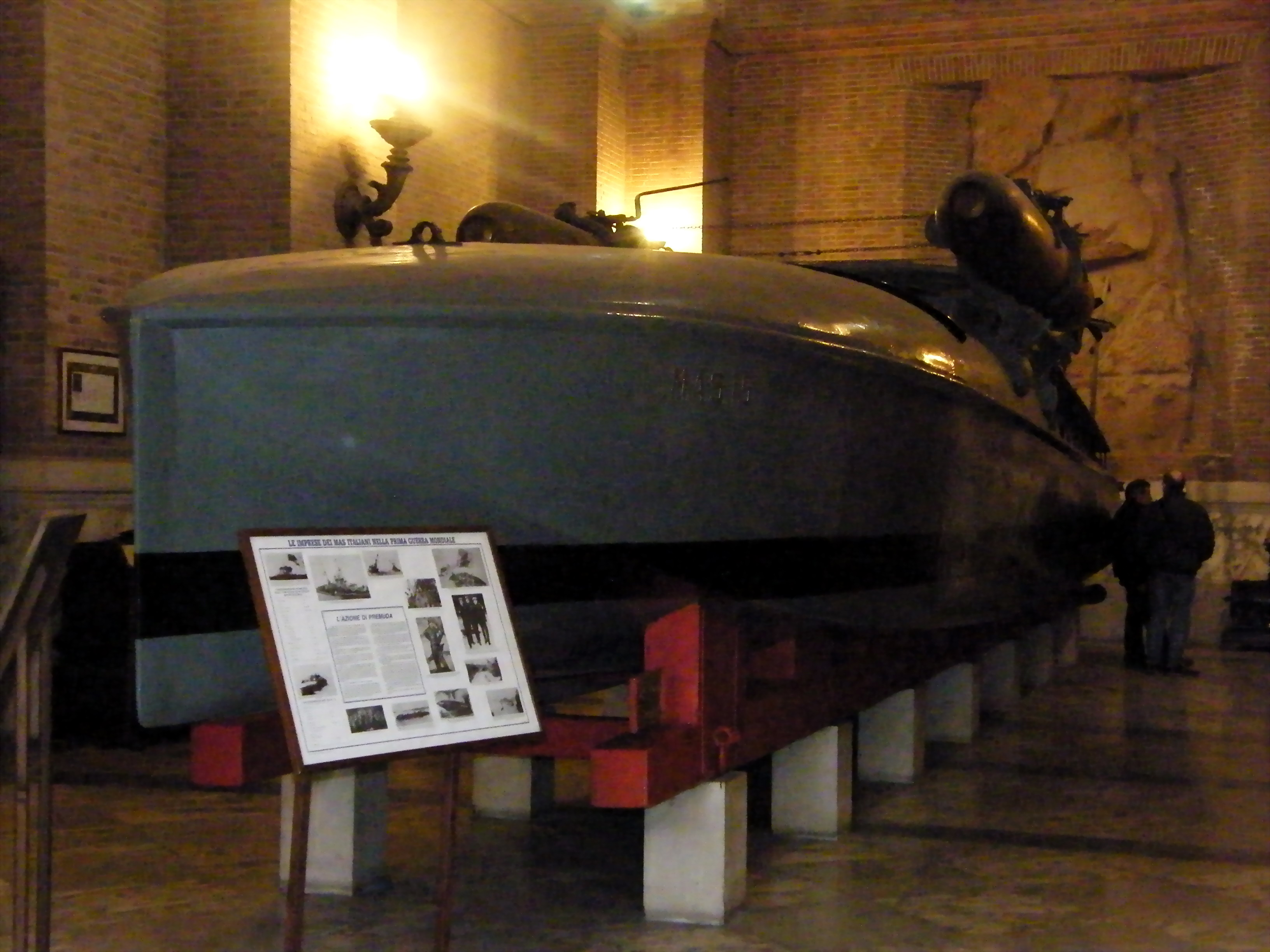
MAS-15, the torpedo boat that sank Szent István, on display in Rome

After the war MAS-15 was installed in the Monument to Vittorio Emanuele II as part of the Museo del Risorgimento in Rome for the torpedo boat's role in the sinking of Szent István. The anniversary of the sinking, 10 June, has been celebrated by the Regia Marina, and its successor, the Marina Militare, as the official Italian Navy Day (Italian: Festa della Marina).

The wreck of Szent István was located in the mid-1970s by the Yugoslav Navy. She lies upside down at a depth of 66 metres (217 ft). Her bow broke off when it hit the seabed while the stern was still afloat, but is immediately adjacent to the rest of the heavily encrusted hull. The two holes from the torpedo hits are visible in the side of the ship as is another deep hole, although the torpedo bulkhead there is still intact. The wreck is a protected site of the Croatian Ministry of Culture.

Szent István holds the distinction of the largest warship and ship ever built by Hungary.

== Consequences ==
Konteradmiral Horthy cancelled the attack because he thought that the Italians had discovered his plan and ordered the ships to return to Pola.

In fact the Italians did not even discover that the Austrian dreadnoughts had departed Pola until later on 10 June when aerial reconnaissance photos revealed that they were no longer there. Capitano di fregata Luigi Rizzo was awarded his second Gold Medal of Military Valor; his first was for sinking the pre-dreadnought battleship Wien in 1917, and appointed a knight of the Order of the Crown of Italy. After the war MAS 15 was installed in the Monument to Vittorio Emanuele II as part of the Museo del Risorgimento in Rome. The anniversary of the sinking has been celebrated by the Regia Marina, and its successor, the Marina Militare, as its Navy Day (Italian: Festa della Marina).

== Sources ==
- Bridge, F. R. (2002) [1972]. From Sadowa to Sarajevo: The Foreign Policy of Austria-Hungary, 1866–1914. London: Routledge & Kegan Paul Ltd. ISBN 978-0-415-27370-1.
- Conrad-Hötzendorf, Franz (1921–1925). Aus meiner Dienstzeit, 1906–1918 (in German). Vienna: Rikola Verlag. OCLC 637021337.
- Earle, Ralph (March 1913). "Professional Notes". United States Naval Institute Proceedings. 39 (1).
- Gebhard, Louis (1968). "Austria-Hungary's Dreadnought Squadron: the Naval Outlay of 1911". Austrian History Yearbook. 4: 245–258. doi:10.1017/S0067237800013230. S2CID 145130091.
- Greger, René (1976). Austro-Hungarian Warships of World War I. London: Ian Allan. ISBN 978-0-7110-0623-2.
- Guérin, Ulrike; Egger, Barbara (2013). Maarleveld, Thijs J. (ed.). Manual for Activities Directed at Underwater Cultural Heritage: Guidelines to the Annex of the UNESCO 2001 Convention. Paris: United Nations Educational, Scientific and Cultural Organization. ISBN 978-92-3-001122-2.
- Halpern, Paul G. (1971). The Mediterranean Naval Situation, 1908–1914. Cambridge, MA: Harvard University Press. ISBN 978-0674564626.
- Halpern, Paul G. (1987). The Naval War in the Mediterranean, 1914–1918. Annapolis, Maryland: Naval Institute Press. ISBN 978-0870214486.
- Halpern, Paul G. (1995). A Naval History of World War I. Annapolis, MD: Naval Institute Press. ISBN 978-1-55750-352-7.
- Koburger, Charles (2001). The Central Powers in the Adriatic, 1914–1918: War in a Narrow Sea. Westport: Praeger Publishers. ISBN 978-0-313-00272-4.
- Koudelka, Alfred von (1987). Baumgartner, Lothar (ed.). Denn Österreich lag einst am Meer: das Leben des Admirals Alfred von Koudelka (in German) (1. Aufl. ed.). Graz: H. Weishaupt Verlag. ISBN 978-3900310349.
- Noppen, Ryan (2012). Austro-Hungarian Battleships 1914–18. Oxford: Osprey Publishing. ISBN 978-1-84908-688-2.
- Preston, Antony (2002). World's Worst Warships. London: Conway's Maritime Press. ISBN 978-0-85177-754-2.
- Sieche, Erwin F. (1985). "Austria-Hungary". In Gardiner, Robert; Gray, Randal (eds.). Conway's All the World's Fighting Ships 1906–1921. Annapolis: Naval Institute Press. ISBN 978-0-85177-245-5.
- Sieche, Erwin F. (1991). "S.M.S. Szent István: Hungaria's Only and Ill-Fated Dreadnought". Warship International. XXVII (2): 112–146. ISSN 0043-0374.
- Sieche, Erwin F. (1997). "The Szent István Wreck: 'Wreck Divers' Experiences". Warship International. 34 (4): 365–380. ISSN 0043-0374.
- Sokol, Anthony (1968). The Imperial and Royal Austro-Hungarian Navy. Annapolis, MD: Naval Institute Press. OCLC 462208412.
- Sondhaus, Lawrence (1994). The Naval Policy of Austria-Hungary, 1867–1918: Navalism, Industrial Development, and the Politics of Dualism. West Lafayette, IN: Purdue University Press. ISBN 1-55753-034-3.
- Vego, Milan N. (1996). Austro-Hungarian Naval Policy: 1904–14. London: Routledge. ISBN 978-0714642093.
