= Luigi Rizzo =

Italian admiral (1887–1951)

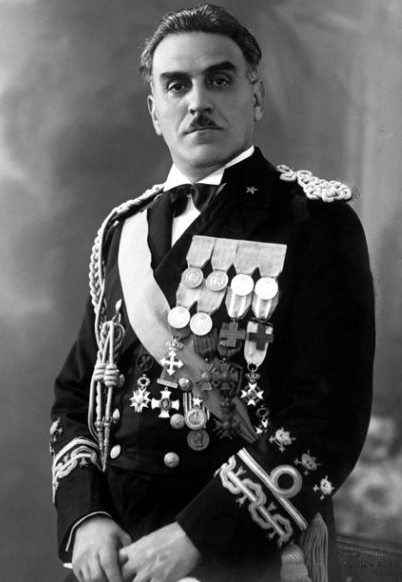
- Rear Admiral Luigi Rizzo in 1935
- Born: 8 October 1887; Milazzo
- Died: 27 June 1951 (aged 63); Rome
- Military career
- Allegiance: Kingdom of Italy (1912–20 and 1940–41)
- Branch: Regia Marina
- Rank: Divisional Admiral
- Nicknames: l'Affondatore (The Sinker)
- Conflicts: First World War; Second Italo-Abyssinian War; Second World War
- Awards: Gold Medal of Military Valour (2); Silver Medal of Military Valor (4); Cross of War; Order of the Crown of Italy; Croix de Guerre (France); Distinguished Service Order (United Kingdom); Navy Distinguished Service Medal (United States); Legion of Honour (France); Order of Saint Stephen of Hungary (Hungary)

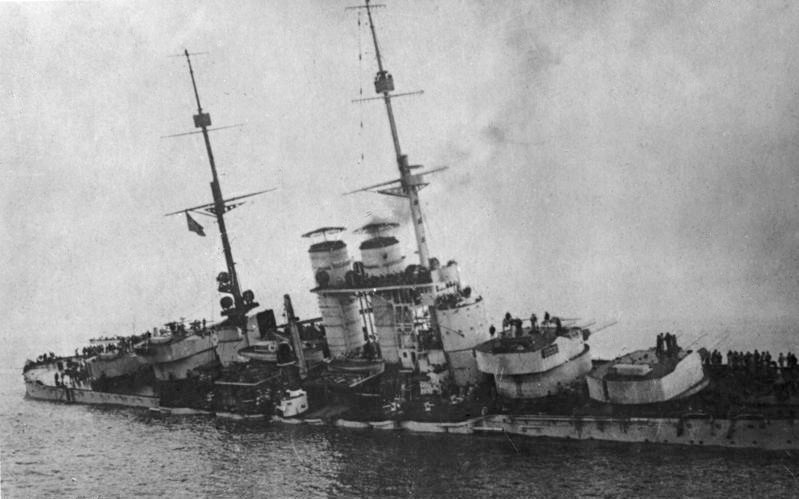
SMS Szent István low in the water

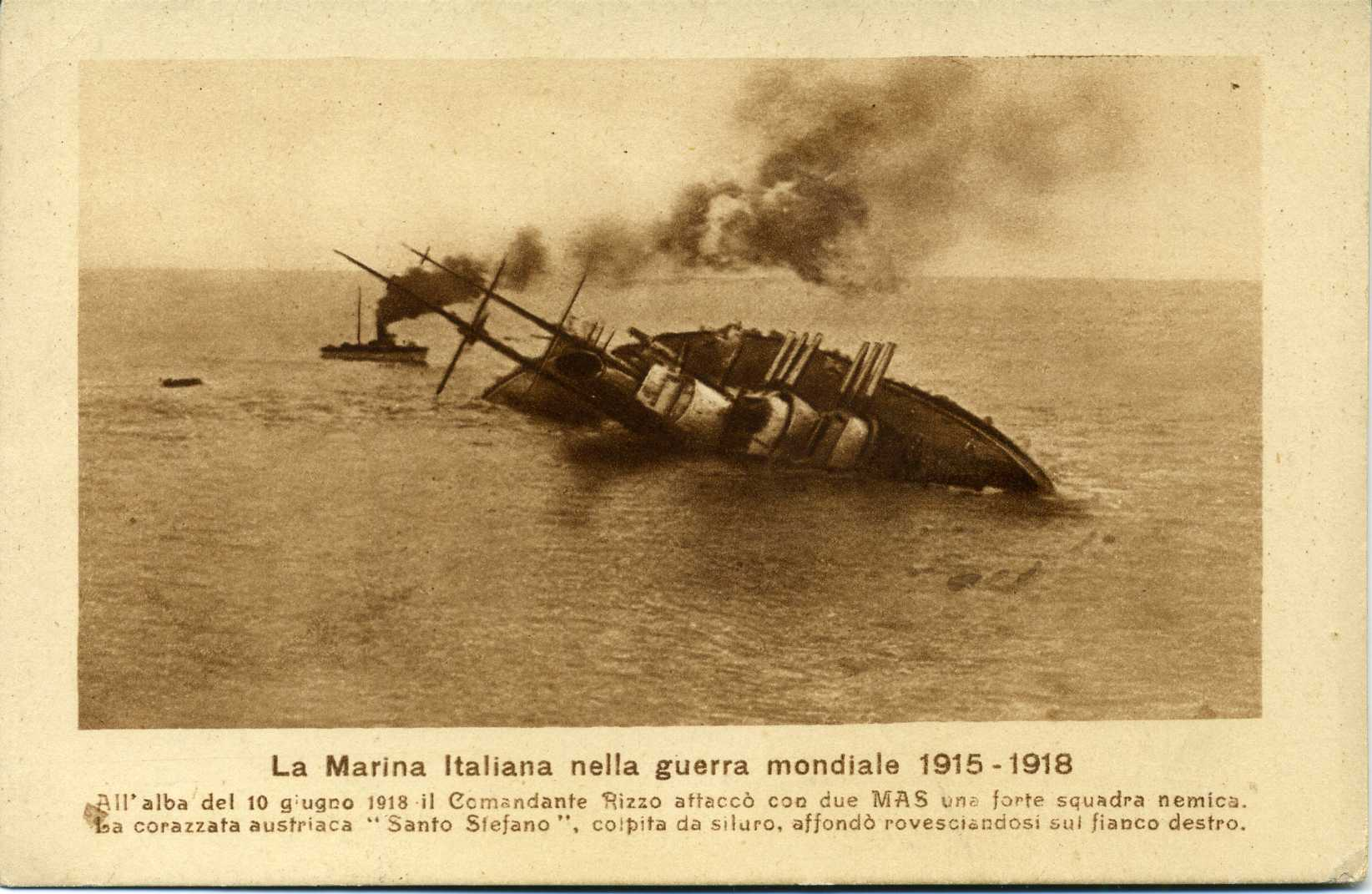
The last moments of SMS Szent István

Luigi Rizzo, 1st Count of Grado and Premuda (1887–1951), nicknamed "the Sinker" (l'Affondatore), was an Italian admiral. He is mostly known for his distinguished service in World War I as a torpedo boat commander, having sunk two Austro-Hungarian battleships (SMS Wien in 1917 and SMS Szent István in 1918).

== Biography ==
He was born in Milazzo, Sicily, on 8 October 1887 to a family of merchant ship captains. While a Student Captain in the merchant marine, on 17 March 1912 he was appointed second lieutenant of the Naval Reserve.

=== World War I ===
After Italy's entry into World War I, from June 1915 to the end of 1916, he was assigned to the maritime defence of Grado, where, on the orders of Lt. Commander Filippo Camperio first, and of Commander Alfredo Dentice di Frasso later, he particularly distinguished himself, obtaining a Silver Medal of Military Valor. He was later transferred to the newly formed MAS flotilla, participating in various war missions. They include:

- May 1917: He captured two pilots of an Austrian seaplane downed by engine failure; for this action, he was awarded his second Silver Medal of Military Valor;
- December 1917: Sinking of the Austrian battleship SMS Wien, which took place in the Bay of Trieste. For this action, Rizzo was decorated with the Gold Medal of Military Valor. In the same month, for missions carried out in defence of the mouth of the River Piave, he was decorated with a third Silver Medal of Military Valor and was advanced to lieutenant for war merits, obtaining the transition to the Permanent Service in the Royal Italian Navy
- February 1918: With Gabriele d'Annunzio and Costanzo Ciano, he participated in the "Bakar mockery", obtaining a Bronze Medal of Military Valor, elevated, at the end of the war, to a Silver Medal of Military Valor
- June 1918: On 10 June 1918, off the coast of Premuda, he attacked and sank the battleship SMS Szent István. For this action, he was awarded the Knight's Cross of the Military Order of Savoy. On account of Royal Decree nr. 753 of 25 May 1915, which forbade the same person to be awarded more than three medals, including silver and gold, he was not awarded the second Gold Medal of Military Valor. This restriction was repealed with the R.D. n. 975 of 15 June 1922, and then, with the R.D. of 27 May 1923, his appointment as a knight of the Military Order of Savoy was revoked, and he was awarded the Gold Medal of Military Valor for the Action of Premuda.

=== Later life ===
In 1919, he joined as a volunteer in the capture of Fiume by d'Annunzio, and was placed by the latter at the helm of the 'Fleet of Carnaro'; he operated, providing food to the city, until the start of 1920. That year he left active duty with the rank of Commander. In 1925, he assumed the chairmanship of the Aeolian Navigation Society of Messina, a position he held until 1948. The following year he founded Calatimbar in Genoa, a company of shipowners, exporters and shippers, which was intended to board all goods departing from that port. Calatimbar was also attended by companies such as Fiat, and public agencies, such as the Port Consortium and the State Railways. In the following years he was also appointed president of the Italian seamen's welfare fund, the Italian Maritime Safety Union, and the Transadriatica airline.

By the Royal Decree of 25 October 1932, on 20 June 1935 he was appointed Count of Grado. The Premuda appointment was added to the Grado title with the “motu proprio” Royal Decree of 20 October 1941. In 1936, as a volunteer, he participated in the Second Italo-Ethiopian War; on 18 June 1936, he was appointed Division Admiral in the Naval Reserve for outstanding merit. On 10 June 1940, at Italy's entry into World War II, he asked to return to active duty, and he dealt with the anti-submarine warfare in the Sicilian Channel; he was discharged from service in January 1941, assuming the post of President of Lloyd Triestino. On 20 February 1942, he was appointed President of the Adriatic Shipyards; after the Italian armistice on 8 September 1943, he ordered the sabotage of ocean liners and steamers so that they would not fall into German hands. For this initiative, he was transferred by the Gestapo to Austria, first to Klagenfurt prison and later to the obligatory stay in Hirschegg, where he was reached by his daughter Maria Guglielmina.

He died in Rome on 27 June 1951, two months after an operation for lung cancer. The operation was carried out by Professor Raffaele Paolucci, his great friend, who during the Great War had been the protagonist, with Major Raffaele Rossetti, of the sinking in the port of Pola of SMS Viribus Unitis.

== Honours ==
Two Italian warships have been named in his honour; The Bergamini-class frigate, Luigi Rizzo (F 596) in service from 1960–1980, and the FREMM multipurpose frigate, Luigi Rizzo (F 595) commissioned in 2017 and in active service.

== See also ==
- Giuseppe Aonzo

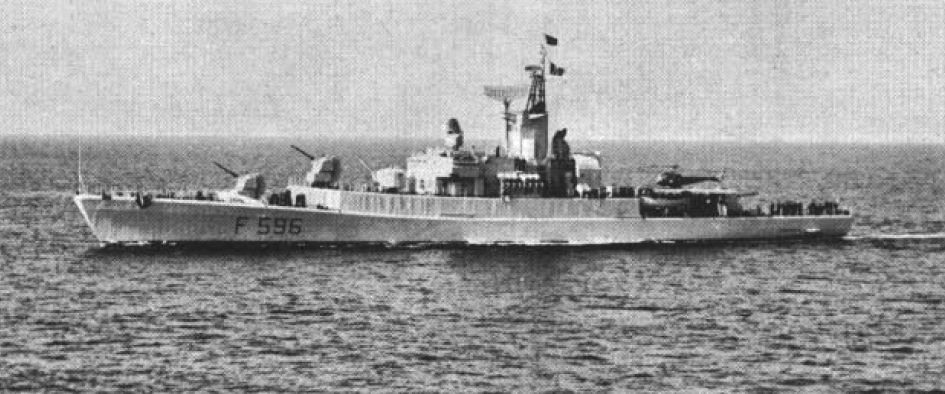
Luigi Rizzo (F 596)

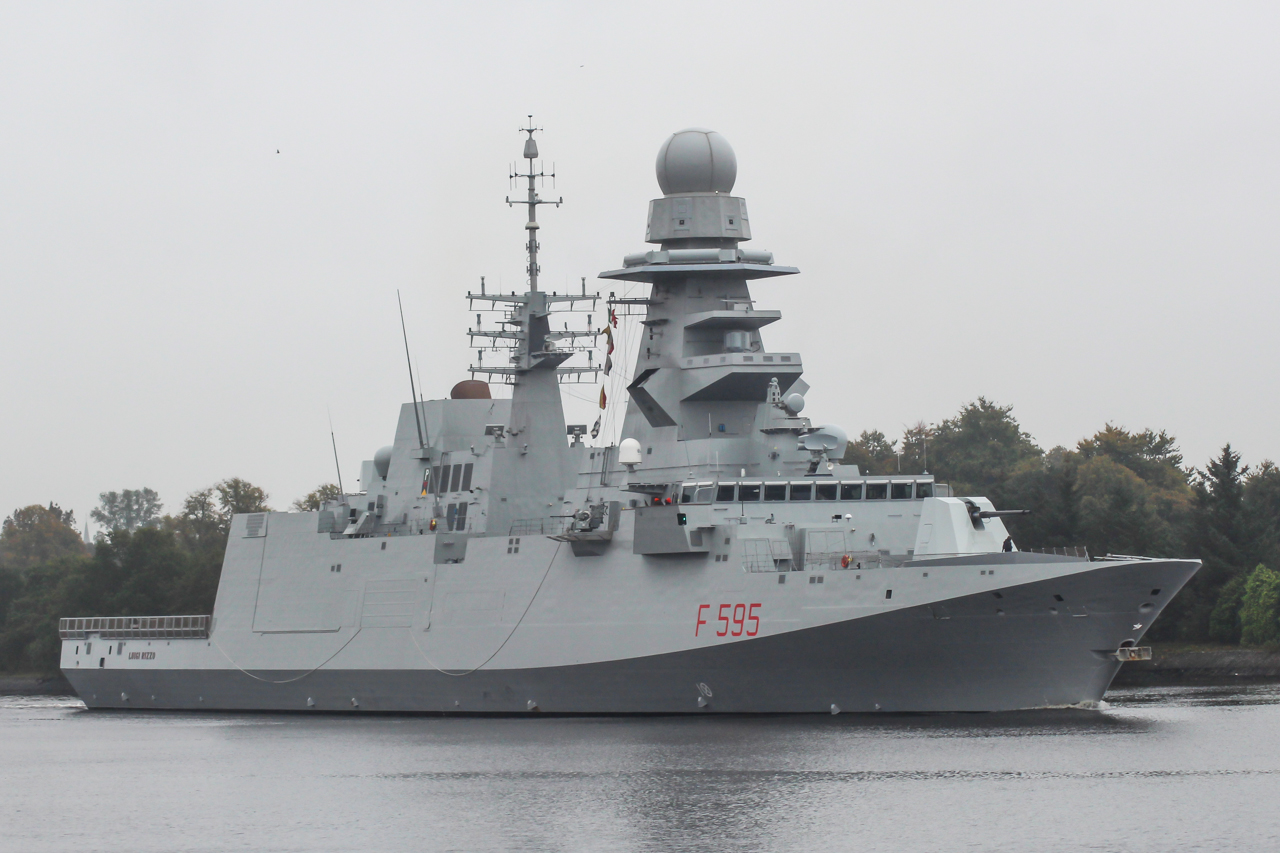
Luigi Rizzo (F 595)
