= Italian frigate Luigi Rizzo (F 596) =

Bergamini-class frigates of the Italian Navy

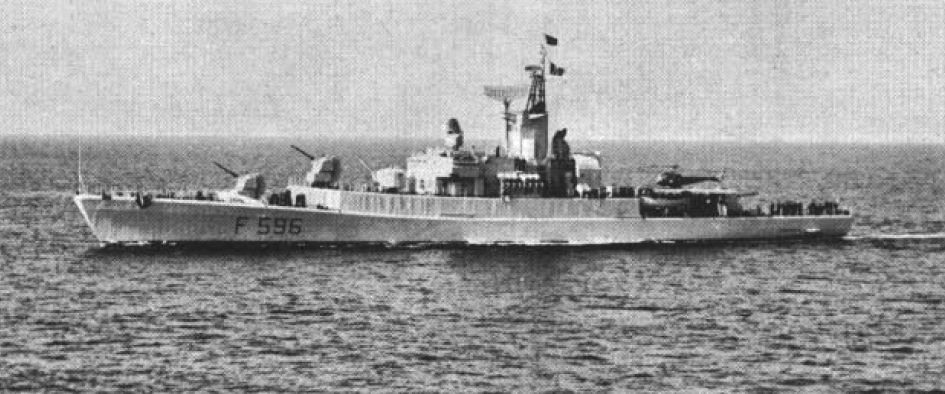
- Luigi Rizzo

History

Italy
- Name: Luigi Rizzo
- Namesake: Luigi Rizzo
- Builder: Navalmeccanica
- Laid down: 26 May 1957
- Launched: 6 March 1960
- Commissioned: 15 December 1961
- Decommissioned: 30 November 1980
- Stricken: 1980
- Identification: Pennant number: F 596
- Motto: In questo nome è la vittoria; (In this name is victory)
- Fate: Dismantled

General characteristics
- Class & type: Bergamini-class frigate
- Displacement: 1,410 t (1,390 long tons) standard; 1,650 t (1,620 long tons) full load
- Length: 86.5 m (283 ft 10 in) pp; 94.0 m (308 ft 5 in) overall
- Beam: 11.4 m (37 ft 5 in)
- Draught: 3.1 m (10 ft 2 in)
- Propulsion: 4 × diesels 16,000 bhp (12,000 kW); 2 × shafts
- Speed: 25 knots (46 km/h; 29 mph)
- Range: 3,000 nautical miles (5,600 km; 3,500 mi) at 18 knots (33 km/h; 21 mph)
- Complement: 163
- Sensors & processing systems: SPS-12 radar; SPQ-2 navigational radar; RTN-10 fire-control radar
- Electronic warfare & decoys: SPR-A ESM system
- Armament: 2 × 76 mm (3 in) DP guns; 1 × ASW mortar; 2 × triple 324 mm (12.8 in) torpedo tubes
- Aircraft carried: 1 × AB-212ASW helicopter
- Aviation facilities: Single hangar and helipad

Luigi Rizzo (F 596) was a Bergamini-class frigate of the Italian Navy.

== Construction and career ==
She was laid down on 26 May 1957 and launched on 6 March 1960 by Navalmeccanica. She was commissioned on 15 December 1961.

Luigi Rizzo was decommissioned in 1980.

== Gallery ==
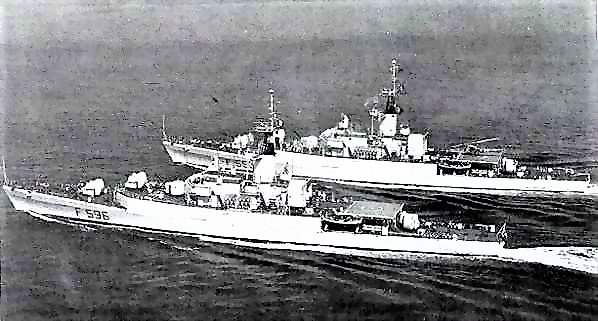
Luigi Rizzo and her sister ship Carlo Bergamini underway in the 1960s.

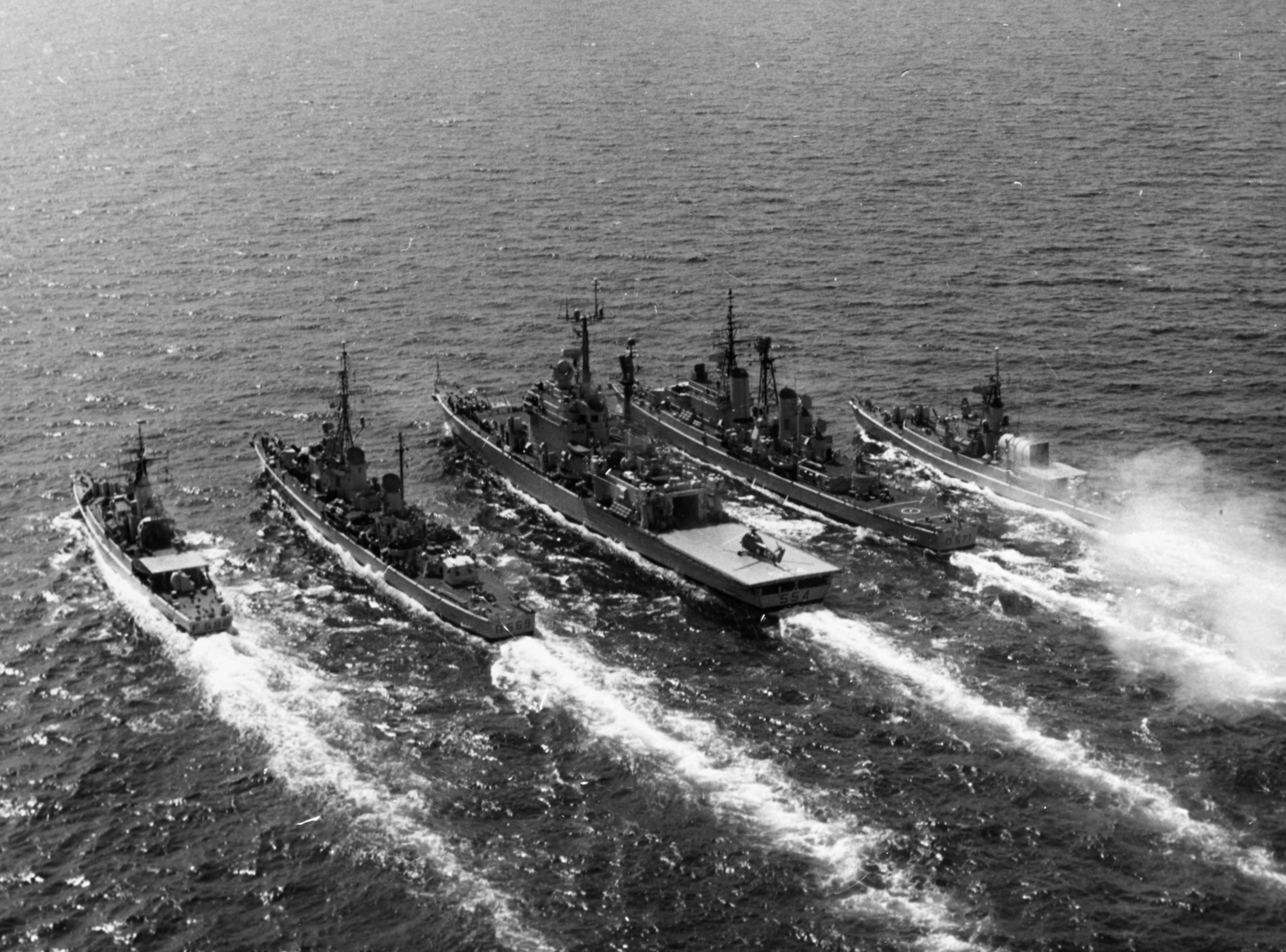
Luigi Rizzo, Indomito, Caio Duilio and Intrepido in the 1970s.
