= Italian destroyer Giovanni Acerbi =

1917 Italian destroyer

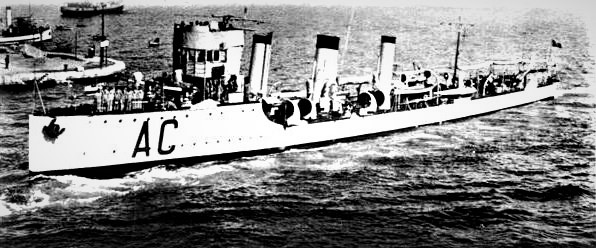
- Giovanni Acerbi underway in the channel at Taranto, sometime between 1917 and 1939.

History

Kingdom of Italy
- Name: Giovanni Acerbi
- Namesake: Giovanni Acerbi (1825–1869), Italian soldier and politician
- Builder: Cantieri navali Odero, Sestri Ponente, Italy
- Laid down: 2 February 1916
- Launched: 14 February 1917
- Completed: 26 February 1917
- Commissioned: 26 February 1917
- Reclassified: Torpedo boat 1 October 1929
- Identification: Pennant number AC
- Fate: Sunk or scuttled 4 April 1941 (see text)

General characteristics
- Class & type: Giuseppe Sirtori-class destroyer
- Displacement: 709 t (698 long tons) (normal); 914 t (900 long tons) (deep load)
- Length: 73.54 m (241 ft 3 in) (o/a)
- Beam: 7.34 m (24 ft 1 in)
- Draft: 2.7 m (8 ft 10 in) (mean)
- Installed power: 4 × Thornycroft boilers; 15,500 shp (11,600 kW)
- Propulsion: 2 shafts; 2 steam turbines
- Speed: 30 knots (56 km/h; 35 mph)
- Range: 1,700 nmi (3,100 km; 2,000 mi) at 12 knots (22 km/h; 14 mph)
- Complement: 98 officers and men
- Armament: 6 × single 102 mm (4 in) guns; 2 × single 40 mm (1.6 in) AA guns; 2 × twin 450 mm (17.7 in) torpedo tubes; 10 × mines

Giovanni Acerbi was the second of four Giuseppe Sirtori-class destroyers built for the Italian Regia Marina (Royal Navy) during World War I. She played an active part in the later stages of that war's Adriatic campaign, including a significant role in that campaign's largest surface action, the Battle of the Strait of Otranto in 1917. Reclassified as a torpedo boat in 1929, she was serving in the Red Sea Flotilla when Italy entered World War II in June 1940. She was disabled in September 1940, stripped of her armament, and either scuttled or sunk in 1941.

== Design ==
The ships of the Giuseppe Sirtori class were 72.5 m (237 ft 10 in) long at the waterline and 73.54 m (241 ft 3 in) long overall, with a beam of 7.34 m (24 ft 1 in) and a mean draft of 2.7 m (8 ft 10 in). They displaced 709 t (698 long tons) standard and up to 914 t (900 long tons) at full load. They had a crew of 98 officers and enlisted men. The ships were powered by two steam turbines, with steam provided by four Thornycroft water-tube boilers. The engines were rated to produce 15,500 shaft horsepower (11,600 kW) for a top speed of 30 knots (56 km/h; 35 mph), though in service they reached as high as 33.6 knots (62.2 km/h; 38.7 mph) from around 17,000 shp (13,000 kW). At a more economical speed of 15 knots (28 km/h; 17 mph), the ships could cruise for 1,700 nautical miles (3,100 km; 2,000 mi).

Giovanni Acerbi was armed with a main battery of six 102 mm (4 in) guns. Her light armament consisted of a pair of 40 mm (1.6 in) anti-aircraft guns and two 6.5 mm (0.26 in) machine guns. She was also equipped with four 450 mm (17.7 in) torpedo tubes in two twin launchers, one on each side of the ship. The ship also carried ten naval mines.

== Construction and commissioning ==
Giovanni Acerbi was laid down at the Cantieri navali Odero shipyard in Sestri Ponente, Italy, on 2 February 1916. She was launched on 14 February 1917 and completed and commissioned on 26 February 1917.

== Service history ==
=== World War I ===
==== Battle of the Strait of Otranto, 1917 ====
On the night of 14–15 May 1917, the Battle of the Strait of Otranto began when the Austro-Hungarian Navy staged a two-pronged attack against the Otranto Barrage in the Strait of Otranto aimed both at destroying naval drifters — armed fishing boats that patrolled the anti-submarine barrier the barrage formed — and, as a diversionary action, at destroying an Italian convoy made up of the steamers Bersagliere, Carroccio, and Verità, escorted by the destroyer Borea, bound from the Kingdom of Greece to the Principality of Albania. In the battle's first action, which lasted from 03:06 to 03:45 on 15 May, the Austro-Hungarian destroyers Balaton and Csepel attacked the convoy, sinking Borea and Carroccio, seriously damaging Verità, and inflicting lighter damage on Bersagliere. The scout cruisers Helgoland, Novara, and Saida then attacked the drifters, sinking 14 of them between 04:20 and 05:47.

At Brindisi, Italy, Giovanni Acerbi had lit her boilers at 03:30 and was ready for sea at 04:00. News of the attacks reached Brindisi at 04:10, and at 04:50 the British Royal Navy light cruiser HMS Bristol — limited by mechanical problems to a maximum speed of 24 knots (44 km/h; 28 mph) — and the Italian destroyers Antonio Mosto and Rosolino Pilo departed Brindisi, heading northeast to intercept the Austro-Hungarian naval formation. At 05:36 Giovanni Acerbi, under the command of Capitano di corvetta (Corvette Captain) Vannutelli, got underway in company with the British light cruiser HMS Dartmouth — serving as flagship of the Italian Contrammiraglio (Counter Admiral) Alfredo Acton — and the Italian destroyer Simone Schiaffino.} Dartmouth, Giovanni Acerbi, and Simone Schiaffino rendezvoused with Bristol, Rosolino Pilo, and Antonio Mosto and combined into a single formation under Acton′s command between 06:56 and 07:12, limiting all the ships to Bristol′s maximum speed of 24 knots (44 km/h; 28 mph). The Italian scout cruiser Aquila joined the formation at 07:40. While making 24 knots (44 km/h; 28 mph) on a course of 035º at 07:45, the Allied ships sighted smoke astern, which they soon identified as Balaton and Csepel, returning from their attack on the convoy. At either 07:50 or 8:00, according to different sources, Acton ordered Aquila and the destroyers to attack Balaton and Cespel while the larger ships maneuvered to cut off their escape route toward the Austro-Hungarian naval base at Cattaro. At 08:10, Aquila and the destroyers steered to attack Balaton and Csepel, working up to 35 to 36 knots (65 to 67 km/h; 40 to 41 mph) with Aquila in the center at the head of the formation, Antonio Mosto and Simone Schiaffino on her starboard side, and Giovanni Acerbi and Rosolino Pilo to port. At 08:15 the two sides opened fire at one another at a range of 11,400 metres (12,500 yards). The Italians hit Balaton immediately, but the Austro-Hungarians quickly scored a hit on Aquila that immobilized her, after which Balaton and Cespel moved close to the coast of Dalmatia, under the protection of Austro-Hungarian coastal artillery batteries, and outdistanced their pursuers.

At 08:45, Helgoland, Novara, and Saida arrived on the scene from the southwest, heading towards the immobilized Aquila. Antonio Mosto and Giovanni Acerbi joined the two British light cruisers, moving into formation aft of Bristol, and at around 09:05, with Dartmouth in the lead, Dartmouth, Bristol, Antonio Mosto, and Giovanni Acerbi positioned themselves between Aquila and the three Austro-Hungarian scout cruisers. The Allied ships opened fire on the Austro-Hungarians at 09:30 at a range of 8,500 metres (9,300 yards). The three Austro-Hungarian ships retreated to the northwest with the Allied formation in pursuit and continuing to fire at ranges of between 4,500 metres (4,900 yards) and 10,000 metres (10,900 yards). Initially Dartmouth led the Allied column, followed in order by Bristol, Giovanni Acerbi, and Antonio Mosto, although Bristol began to lag behind Dartmouth because of her trouble maintaining speed. Giovanni Acerbi opened fire at a range of 9,500 metres (10,400 yards), then, acting on the initiative of her commanding officer, passed the lagging Bristol and took position behind Dartmouth. Due to Bristol′s low top speed, the distance between the two formations increased continuously, from 6,000 metres (6,600 yards) at 09:45 to 7,400 metres (8,100 yards) at 10:00, to 8,800 metres (9,600 yards) at 10:20, and to 9,800 metres (10,700 yards) at 10:24. The weight of the fighting fell almost exclusively on Dartmouth and Giovanni Acerbi, the only destroyer in a suitable position to fire. In the exchange of gunfire, all the major ships were damaged: Bristol was hit three times, Dartmouth four, and Saida once, while Helgoland suffered three hits and Novara eleven, inflicting damage which immobilized Novara.

Dartmouth, having closed with Saida, signaled the other Allied ships to follow. Perhaps because of smoke obscuring some of Dartmouth′s signal flags, Giovanni Acerbi probably noticed only the first flag, which alone meant "attack the enemy formation." Accordingly, she moved to within 9,500 metres (10,400 yards) of the three Austro-Hungarian scout cruisers as they made preparations to take Novara under tow and opened fire at 11:15, continuing to fire at a very high rate at 8,000 to 9,000 metres (8,700 to 9,800 yards) and closing to a range of 7,300 metres (8,000 yards). Had Giovanni Acerbi′s action been part of a coordinated attack covered by gunfire from the British light cruisers, the situation would have been favorable for Giovanni Acerbi to make a torpedo attack, but such support did not exist, and Giovanni Acerbi found herself alone and under fire by all three Austro-Hungarian scout cruisers. Their gunfire prevented her from getting close enough to launch torpedoes. Subsequently, one of Giovanni Acerbi′s guns jammed, so she withdrew to a range of 10,000 to 11,000 metres (10,900 to 12,000 yards) to clear the jam. While her crew worked on the gun, Austro-Hungarian aircraft attacked her. At 11:36, Giovanni Acerbi′s radio picked up a transmission from Dartmouth of Acton's order to the other ships to regroup, so she gave up on her torpedo attack and rejoined the formation, reporting to Acton aboard Dartmouth that Novara was dead in the water.

The Allied ships discontinued the action and withdrew at 12:05 when they reached the vicinity of Cattaro and the Austro-Hungarian armored cruiser Sankt Georg and destroyers Tátra and Warasdinier sortied to reinforce the three scout cruisers. Dartmouth, Giovanni Acerbi, and the Italian destroyers Impavido, Indomito, and Insidioso joined up for the return voyage to Italy, during which the French Navy destroyers Casque and Faulx joined them at 13:00. During the voyage, while the Allied ships were making 20 to 25 knots (37 to 46 km/h; 23 to 29 mph), the Imperial German Navy submarine UC-25, operating under the Austro-Hungarian flag as "U-89," attacked them, hitting Dartmouth with a torpedo on her port side under her bridge. Dartmouth′s crew abandoned ship at 14:30, but she remained afloat and was towed to Brindisi, where she arrived at 03:00 on 16 May 1917.

==== Later 1917 ====
During the night of 13–14 August 1917, Giovanni Acerbi got underway from Venice, Italy, with the rest of her squadron (the destroyers Francesco Stocco, Giuseppe Sirtori, and Vincenzo Giordano Orsini), another destroyer squadron composed of Animoso, Ardente, Audace, and Giuseppe Cesare Abba, and a destroyer section composed of Carabiniere and Pontiere to intercept an Austro-Hungarian force made up of the destroyers Dinara, Reka, Scharfschütze, Streiter, and Velebit and six torpedo boats which had supported an air raid by 32 aircraft against Venice which had hit the San Giovanni e Paolo Hospital, killing 14 people and injuring approximately 30 others. Only Vincenzo Giordano Orsini made brief and fleeting contact with the Austro-Hungarian ships. She had to discontinue her pursuit when she approached Austro-Hungarian minefieldsand lost sight of the Austro-Hungarian formation, which then returned to its base without difficulty.

On 29 September 1917, Giovanni Acerbi put to sea with the rest of her destroyer squadron (Franceco Stocco, Giuseppe Cesare Abba, and Vincenzo Giordano Orsini), the scout cruiser Sparviero (flagship of Prince Ferdinando of Udine, who had overall command of the formation), and a destroyer squadron made up of Ardente, Ardito, and Audace to support a bombing attack by 10 Italian Royal Army Caproni aircraft against Pola, Austria-Hungary. At about the same time, Austro-Hungarian seaplanes attacked Ferrara, Italy, setting fire to the airship M.8. An Austro-Hungarian force made up of the destroyers Huszár, Streiter, Turul, and Velebit and the torpedo boats TB 90F, TB 94F, and TB 98M, as well as a fourth torpedo boat, according to some sources, was at sea to support the attack. Alerted to the Austro-Hungarian air attack, the Italian ships headed for the waters off Rovinj (known to the Italians as Rovigno) on the assumption that the Austro-Hungarian ships would pass through the area while returning to base. At 22:03, Sparviero sighted unknown ships about 2 nautical miles (3.7 km; 2.3 mi) away. They were, in fact, the Austro-Hungarians, and at 22:05 the opposing groups opened fire on one another. The gunfire became intense when the opposing ships closed to a range of 2,000 metres (2,200 yards). According to Italian sources, the clash ended at 22:30, when the two formations lost contact because they were on divergent courses and, although the two sides regained contact at 22:45, they lost it completely after a few minutes without achieving significant results. According to Austro-Hungarian sources, Sparviero was hit and suffered serious damage, after which she left the battle line, prompting the other Italian ships to cease fire and withdraw as well, while on the Austro-Hungarian side Velebit was damaged by an Italian projectile which disabled her steering system and started a fire. Streiter took Velebit in tow, but then two Italian destroyers arrived on the scene and closed to a range of 1,000 metres (1,100 yards), but moved away after Streiter, Velebit and the torpedo boats opened fire on them.

At 10:35 on 16 November 1917, the Austro-Hungarian coastal defense ships Budapest and Wien arrived off Cortellazzo, Italy, and began a bombardment of forces on the Italian front, targeting the Italian lines and artillery batteries. Italian coastal artillery immediately returned fire, and Italian aircraft made three attacks on the Austro-Hungarian ships. Budapest and Wien ceased fire at 11:52 to avoid interfering with Austro-Hungarian troops on the front and withdrew, but they returned to the area at 13:30 and resumed fire at 13:35. Giovanni Acerbi departed Venice with Animoso, Ardente, Audace, Francesco Stocco, Giuseppe Cesare Abba, and Vincenzo Giordano Orsini to counter the bombardment. Operating west of the area under bombardment, the destroyers supported an attack by the Italian motor torpedo boats MAS 13 and MAS 15 which, combined with the three air attacks and attacks by the Italian submarines F11 and F13, interfered with the bombardment and ultimately forced Budapest and Wien to withdraw.

On 28 November 1917, an Austro-Hungarian Navy force consisting of Dinara, Huszár, Reka, Streiter, the destroyers Dikla and Triglav, and the torpedo boats TB 78, TB 79, TB 86, and TB 90 attacked the Italian coast. While Dikla, Huszár, Streiter, and the torpedo boats unsuccessfully attacked first Porto Corsini and then Rimini, Dinara, Reka, and Triglav bombarded a railway near the mouth of the Metauro, damaging a train, the railway tracks, and telegraph lines. The Austro-Hungarian ships then reunited and headed back to the main Austro-Hungarian naval base at Pola. Giovanni Acerbi, Animoso, Aquila, Ardente, Ardito, Audace, Francesco Stocco, Giuseppe Cesare Abba, Giuseppe Sirtori, Sparviero, and Vincenzo Giordano Orsini departed Venice and, together with reconnaissance seaplanes, pursued the Austro-Hungarian formation. The seaplanes attacked the Austro-Hungarians without success, and the Italian ships had to give up the chase when they did not sight the Austro-Hungarians until they neared Cape Promontore on the southern coast of Istria, as continuing beyond it would bring them too close to Pola.

==== 1918 ====
On 10 February 1918 Giovanni Acerbi, Ardito, Aquila, Ardente, Francesco Stocco, and Giuseppe Sirtori — and, according to some sources, the motor torpedo boat MAS 18 — steamed to Porto Levante, now a part of Porto Viro, in case they were needed to support an incursion into the harbor at Bakar (known to the Italians as Buccari) by MAS motor torpedo boats. Sources disagree on whether they remained in port or put to sea to operate in distant support, but in any event, their intervention was unnecessary. The motor torpedo boats carried out their raid, which became known in Italy as the Beffa di Buccari ("Bakar mockery").

The Regia Marina planned a raid under the command of Capitano di fregata (Frigate Captain) Costanzo Ciano against the Austro-Hungarian Navy base at Pola by the small boat Grillo, but had to abort the raid during attempts on the nights of 8–9 April, 12–13 April, 6–7 May, 9–10 May, and 11–12 May 1918. At 17:30 on 13 May, Giovanni Acerbi, Animoso, Francesco Stocco, Giuseppe Sirtori, and Vincenzo Giordano Orsini, the coastal torpedo boats 9 PN and 10 PN, the motor torpedo boats MAS 95 and MAS 96, and Grillo got underway from Venice to attempt the raid again, with the MAS boats towing Grillo. Grillo dropped her tow line at 02:18 on 14 May and began her attempt to penetrate the harbor at Pola. Grillo′s attack, conducted between 03:16 and 03:18, achieved no success and resulted in Grillo′s destruction. Austro-Hungarian searchlights illuminated the MAS boats waiting offshore at 03:35 and again at 03:40, so they withdrew and rejoined the supporting destroyers at 05:00. The Italian force then headed back to port.

On the night of 1–2 July 1918 Giovanni Acerbi, Audace, Francesco Stocco, Giuseppe Sirtori, Vincenzo Giordano Orsini, and the destroyers Giuseppe La Masa and Giuseppe Missori provided distant support to a formation consisting of the torpedo boats Climene and Procione and the coastal torpedo boats 15 OS, 18 OS, 48 OS, 3 PN, 40 PN, 64 PN, 65 PN, and 66 PN. While 15 OS, 18 OS, and 3 PN, towing dummy landing pontoons, staged a simulated amphibious landing to distract Austro-Hungarian troops in support of an Italian advance on the Italian front, 48 OS, 40 PN, 64 PN, 65 PN, and 66 PN bombarded the Austro-Hungarian lines between Cortellazzo and Caorle, proceeding at low speed between the two locations, with Climeme and Procione in direct support. Meanwhile, an Austro-Hungarian force consisting of the destroyers Balaton and Csikós and the torpedo boats TB 83F and TB 88F had put to sea from Pola late on the evening of 1 July to support an Austro-Hungarian air raid on Venice. After an Italian MAS boat made an unsuccessful torpedo attack against Balaton, which was operating with a faulty boiler, at first light on 2 July, the Italian and Austro-Hungarian destroyers sighted one another at 03:10 on 2 July. The Italians opened gunfire on the Austro-Hungarians, who returned fire. During the brief exchange of gunfire that followed, Balaton, in a more advanced position, suffered several shell hits on her forward deck, while Audace, Giuseppe La Masa, and Giuseppe Missori fired on Csikós and the two torpedo boats, scoring a hit on Csikós in her aft boiler room and one hit on each of the torpedo boats. On the Italian side, Francesco Stocco suffered damage which set her on fire and killed and injured some of her crew. While Giovanni Acerbi remained behind to assist Francesco Stocco, the Austro-Hungarians withdrew toward Pola and the Italians resumed operations in support of their own torpedo boats.

By late October 1918, Austria-Hungary had effectively disintegrated, and the Armistice of Villa Giusti, signed on 3 November 1918, went into effect on 4 November 1918 and brought hostilities between Austria-Hungary and the Allies to an end. On the morning of 4 November, Giovanni Acerbi, Giuseppe Sirtori, Francesco Stocco, and Vincenzo Giordano Orsini got underway from Venice with the battleship Emanuele Filiberto, flagship of Contrammiraglio (Counter Admiral) Guglielmo Rainer, in command of the operation, to take possession of Fiume. During the voyage, Giovanni Acerbi and Vincenzo Giordano Orsini were detached, Giovanni Acerbi to occupy Opatija (known to the Italians as Abbazio) and call at Volosko (known to the Italians as Volosca) on 4 November, and Vincenzo Giordano Orsini to occupy Lošinj (known to the Italians as Lussino). Giovanni Acerbi, under the command of Capitano di corvetta (Corvette Captain) Po, arrived at Opatija at 12:00 on 4 November, where she disembarked a platoon of sailors with a machine gun and raised an Italian flag. Local Yugoslavs protested the raising of the flag, and tensions between the minority Italian and majority Yugoslav populations made the local situation so uncertain that Italy's taking possession of the city was merely a formality, without a real occupation. During the same day Giovanni Acerbi also arrived at Volosko to make contact with the local population and assess the situation there. On 8 November, Giovanni Acerbi joined Vincenzo Giordano Orsini at Lošinj, an island with an Italian majority as well as numerous Yugoslavian soldiers, where there were strong tensions.

World War I ended on 11 November 1918 with the armistice between the Allies and the German Empire. The situation at Volosko was resolved that day when Giuseppe Sirtori occupied it. At Lošinj, tensions were not resolved until 20 November, when Italian fores definitively occupied the island, disarmed the Yugoslavian soldiers and evacuated them to Fiume, and seized war material, a yacht, and some merchant ships.

=== Interwar period ===
In 1920 Giovanni Acerbi underwent modifications which saw the replacement of her six single 102-millimetre (4 in)/35 mm Schneider-Armstrong 1914-15 guns with the more modern 102-millimetre (4 in)/45 Schneider-Armstrong 1917 model.

In 1929 Giovanni Acerbi, Francesco Stocco, Giuseppe Sirtori, and the destroyer Ippolito Nievo formed the X Destroyer Squadron, which together with the five-ship IX Destroyer Squadron and the scout cruiser Aquila constituted the 5th Flotilla of the Special Division, which also included the scout cruiser Brindisi. On 1 October 1929 Giovanni Acerbi, like all ships of her class, was reclassified as a torpedo boat. In 1935 her commanding officer was Tenente di vascello (Ship-of-the-Line Lieutenant) Adriano Foscari, a future recipient of the Gold Medal of Military Valor.

=== World War II ===
World War II broke out in September 1939 with Nazi Germany's invasion of Poland. Fascist Italy joined the war on the side of the Axis powers with its invasion of France on 10 June 1940. At the time, Giovanni Acerbi and Vincenzo Giordano Orsini were stationed in the Red Sea and based at Massawa in the Eritrea Governorate of Italian East Africa as part of the Regia Marina′s Red Sea Flotilla (Flottiglia del mar rosso).

On the morning of 27 June 1940 Giovanni Acerbi got underway from Massawa with the destroyers Leone and Pantera to assist the Italian submarine Perla, which had run aground after methyl chloride fumes poisoned a large part of her crew. Leone returned to Massawa almost immediately due to damage, and the rest of the formation subsequently had to reverse course when it received a warning that a larger Allied naval force composed of the Royal New Zealand Navy light cruiser HMNZS Leander and the British destroyers HMS Kandahar and HMS Kingston had put to sea to destroy Perla. The Italian Regia Aeronautica (Royal Air Force) intervened and saved Perla, which then underwent temporary repairs and was towed to Massawa on 20 July 1940.

At around 18:00 on either 6 or 8 August (according to different sources), Giovanni Acerbi was struck by bombs while moored at Massawa during an air raid by two or three (according to different sources) British Royal Air Force Bristol Blenheim bombers. According to one account, a single bomb hit the ship, while according to another a salvo of bombs dropped by two Blenheims struck her. In either case, one bomb hit the ship at her third funnel, exploding in the engine room, seriously damaging the deck and the funnel above, killing 15 men, and wounding approximately 30. The damage was so serious that it was almost irreparable. The ship, no longer able to put to sea and considered unusable, was first towed into a dry dock and then laid up and moored to a quay, and was stripped of four, five, or all six (according to various sources) of her 102-millimetre (4 in) guns and some of her machine guns. The machine guns were used to strengthen the anti-aircraft defenses of Massawa. Four 102-millimetre (4 in)/45 guns were placed near Ras Cambit on the island of Dahlak Kebir to arm the coastal artillery battery "Acerbi-Ma 314," while another went, with two 102-millimetre (4 in)/35 guns taken from the minelayer Ostia, to arm the coastal artillery battery "Ma 370" placed near the port of Massawa. The damage and subsequent stripping of weapons reduced Giovanni Acerbi to a floating wreck.

Allied forces conquered Italian East Africa in the East African campaign of 1940–1941. Sources differ on Giovanni Acerbi′s final fate. According to one account, British aircraft — either Royal Air Force bombers or Royal Navy Fleet Air Arm Fairey Swordfish torpedo bombers from the aircraft carrier HMS Eagle, according to different sources — sank her in the harbor at Massawa on 4 April 1941, a few days before the British occupation of the city. According to other sources, however, Giovanni Acerbi, still floating, was towed to the mouth of the military port at Massawa and scuttled there with the steamers Impero, Moncalieri, Oliva, and XXIII Marzobefore the fall of the city to the Allies in order to block access to the port as part of the plan the Italians drew up to render the port of Massawa unusable before Allied forces conquered it, and papers drawn up by the British occupation authorities state that the wreck of Giovanni Acerbi was in fact found in that position. One source specifies the date of the scuttling as 4 April 1941, but the others do not provide a scuttling date.
