= Italian destroyer Antonio Mosto =

Italian Rosolino Pilo-class destroyer

History

Kingdom of Italy
- Name: Antonio Mosto
- Namesake: Antonio Mosto (1824–1880), Italian soldier and patriot
- Builder: Cantiere Pattison, Naples, Kingdom of Italy
- Laid down: 9 October 1913
- Launched: 20 May 1915
- Commissioned: 7 July 1915
- Identification: Pennant number MO, MT
- Motto: A qualunque costo avanti ("Go Ahead at Any Cost")
- Fate: To Italian Republic 1946

Italian Republic
- Reclassified: Minesweeper 1953
- Stricken: 15 December 1958
- Identification: Pennant number M 5335 (1953)
- Fate: Scrapped

General characteristics
- Class & type: Rosolino Pilo-class destroyer
- Displacement: 912 tons (max); 770 tons (standard)
- Length: 73 m (240 ft)
- Beam: 7.3 m (24 ft)
- Draught: 2.3 m (7 ft 7 in)
- Installed power: 16,000 brake horsepower (11,931 kW)
- Propulsion: 1 × Tosi steam turbines; 4 × Thornycroft boilers
- Speed: 30 knots (56 km/h; 35 mph)
- Range: 1,200 nmi (2,200 km; 1,400 mi) at 14 knots (26 km/h; 16 mph)
- Complement: 69-79
- Armament: 1915–1918: 4 × 1 Cannon 76/40 Model 1916; 2 × 1 76mm/30 AA; 4 × 1 450 mm (17.7 in) torpedo tubes; 10 mines; 1919–1921: 5 × 1 102 mm (4.0 in)/35 guns; 2 × 1 - 40 mm/39 AA; 2 x 1 65-millimetre (2.6 in) machine guns; 4 × 1 450 mm (17.7 in) torpedo tubes

Antonio Mosto was an Italian Rosolino Pilo-class destroyers. Commissioned into service in the Italian Regia Marina (Royal Navy) in 1915, she served in World War I, playing an active role in the Adriatic campaign and seeing action in the Battle of the Strait of Otranto in 1917. Reclassified as a torpedo boat in 1929, she participated in the Mediterranean and Adriatic campaigns of World War II. In 1943, she switched to the Allied side, operating as part of the Italian Co-belligerent Navy for the remainder of the war. She served in the postwar Italian Navy (Marina Miltare) and was reclassified as a minesweeper in 1953. She was stricken in 1958.

== Construction and commissioning ==
Antonio Mosto was laid down at the Cantiere Pattison (English: Pattison Shipyard) in Naples, Italy, on 9 October 1913. She was launched on 20 May 1915 and completed and commissioned on 7 July 1915.

== Service history ==
=== World War I ===
==== 1915–1916 ====
World War I broke out in 1914, and the Kingdom of Italy entered the war on the side of the Allies with its declaration of war on Austria-Hungary on 23 May 1915. Antonio Mosto was commissioned just over seven weeks after Italy declared war. On the night of 12–13 August 1915, Antonio Mosto got underway with her sister ship Giuseppe Cesare Abba and the French Navy destroyer Bisson to search for the Austro-Hungarian Navy submarine U-3, which had made an unsuccessful attack on the Italian auxiliary cruiser Città di Catania in the Adriatic Sea east of Brindisi, Italy. Arranged in a radial pattern, the three destroyers first followed the route between the position of the attack and the Austro-Hungarian Navy base at Cattaro, then zigzagged in a northerly direction, and then headed south. At 04:52 on 13 August, Bisson sighted U-3 — which had suffered a mechanical breakdown – on the surface and sank her with gunfire.

On 29 December 1915 Antonio Mosto was among a number of Allied warships that put to sea to intercept an Austro-Hungarian force composed of the scout cruiser Helgoland and the destroyers Balaton, Csepel, Lika, Tátra, and Triglav which had bombarded the harbor at Durrës (known to the Italians as Durazzo) on the coast of the Principality of Albania, sinking the Greek steamer Mikael and two sailing ships while losing Lika, which struck a mine. Antonio Mosto did not play a significant role in the subsequent clash, known as the First Battle of Durazzo, in which Helgoland and British and French cruisers suffered minor damage and French destroyers sank Triglav.

On 13 June 1916 Antonio Mosto and the destroyers Audace, Pilade Bronzetti, and Rosolino Pilo provided escort and support to the motor torpedo boats MAS 5 and MAS 7, which, after the coastal torpedo boats 35 PN and 37 PN towed them to a starting position, penetrated the harbor at Austro-Hungarian-occupied Shëngjin (known to the Italians as San Giovanni di Medua) in Albania. The incursion was unsuccessful: MAS 5 and MAS 7 found no ships moored in the harbor, then withdrew under Austro-Hungarian artillery fire without suffering any damage. On the night of 25–26 June 1916, while Audace, the protected cruiser Marsala, and the destroyers Impavido, Insidioso, and Irrequieto operated in distant support, Antonio Mosto, Giuseppe Cesare Abba, Pilade Bronzetti, and Rosolino Pilo escorted the coastal torpedo boats 34 PN and 36 PN as 34 PN and 36 PN towed MAS 5 and MAS 7 to a point 2.5 nautical miles (4.6 km; 2.9 mi) off Durrës. MAS 5 and MAS 7 then dropped their tow cables at 00:15 on 26 June and raided the harbor at Durrës, launching torpedoes at 01:45 and rejoining Antonio Mosto′s formation at 02:40. The attack resulted in serious damage to the 1,111-gross register ton steamship Sarajevo, and all the Italian ships returned to base safely.

Antonio Mosto underwent repairs at Brindisi during December 1916.

==== 1917 ====
On the night of 14–15 May 1917, the Battle of the Strait of Otranto, the largest naval action of the Adriatic Campaign of World War I, began when the Austro-Hungarian Navy staged a two-pronged attack against the Otranto Barrage aimed both at destroying naval drifters — armed fishing boats that patrolled the anti-submarine barrier the barrage formed — and, as a diversionary action, at destroying an Italian convoy bound from Greece to Albania. At 04:50 on 15 May, following news of these attacks, Antonio Mosto, the Italian destroyer Giovanni Acerbi, and the British light cruiser HMS Bristol got underway to intervene in the clash, heading northeast to intercept the Austro-Hungarian ships. Around 08:10, combat began between the Austro-Hungarians and various Allied naval formations sent out to engage them. The Italian scout cruiser Aquila suffered a hit that immobilized her at around 09:05, and the Austro-Hungarian scout cruisers Helgoland, Novara, and Saida closed with her. Bristol, the British light cruiser HMS Dartmouth, Antonio Mosto, and Giovanni Acerbi placed themselves between Aquila and the Austro-Hungarian ships and opened fire on them at 09:30 at a range of 8,500 metres (9,300 yd). The three Austro-Hungarian ships retreated toward the northwest and the British and Italian ships pursued them at distances of between 4,500 and 10,000 metres (4,900 and 10,900 yd), continuing to fire. All the major warships suffered damage during the battle, but Antonio Mosto′s formation had to discontinue the action and withdraw at 12:05 when it neared Cattaro, from which the Austro-Hungarian armored cruiser Sankt Georg and destroyers Tátra and Warasdiner had sortied to intervene in the engagement.

On the night of 3–4 September 1917 Antonio Mosto, the Italian protected cruiser Nino Bixio, the British light cruiser HMS Weymouth, the Italian destroyer Ippolito Nievo, and the French destroyers Bisson and Commandant Bory departed Otranto to escort six Italian torpedo boats and eight British speedboats that were supposed to carry out a raid against Cattaro. The Allied force had to abort and postpone the attack due to worsening weather conditions.

An Austro-Hungarian Navy force consisting of the scout cruiser Helgoland and the destroyers Balaton, Csepel, Lika, Orjen, Tátra, and Triglav left Cattaro on 18 October 1917 to attack Italian convoys. The Austro-Hungarians found no convoys, so Heligoland and Lika moved within sight of Brindisi to entice Italian ships into chasing them and lure the Italians into an ambush by the Austro-Hungarian submarines U-32 and U-40. Antonio Mosto got underway from Brindisi with Aquila, the scout cruiser Sparviero, the destroyers Giuseppe Missori and Indomito, the British light cruisers HMS Gloucester and HMS Newcastle, and the French destroyers Bisson, Commandant Bory, and Commandant Rivière to join other Italian ships in pursuit of the Austro-Hungarians, but after a long chase which also saw some Italian air attacks on the Austro-Hungarian ships, the Austro-Hungarians escaped and all the Italian ships returned to port without damage.

==== 1918 ====
On 10 March 1918, Antonio Mosto, with the motor torpedo boat MAS 100 in tow, and Ippolito Nievo, towing MAS 99, set out for a raid on Portorož (known to the Italians as Portorose) on the coast of Austria-Hungary, supported by the scout cruisers Alessandro Poerio, Augusto Riboty, Carlo Mirabello, and Cesare Rossarol, the destroyers Giacinto Carini and Pilade Bronzetti, and a French Navy destroyer squadron led by the destroyer Casque. Antonio Mosto, Ippolito Nievo, MAS 99, and MAS 100 reached the vicinity of Portorož, but then had to postpone the operation due to bad weather. The ships attempted the raid again on 16 March, but adverse weather again forced its postponement. They made a third attempt on 8 April 1918, but after aerial reconnaissance ascertained that the port of Portorož was empty, the Italians again called off the operation.

On 2 June 1918 Antonio Mosto and Pilade Bronzetti bombarded the island of Lastovo (known to the Italians as Lagosta) in the Adriatic Sea. The bombardment took place in coordination with a bombing attack on the island by Italian planes based at Cagnano Varano, Italy.

By late October 1918, Austria-Hungary had effectively disintegrated, and the Armistice of Villa Giusti, signed on 3 November 1918, went into effect on 4 November 1918 and brought hostilities between Austria-Hungary and the Allies to an end. World War I ended a week later with the armistice between the Allies and the German Empire on 11 November 1918.

=== Interwar period ===
After the end of World War I, Antonio Mosto′s armament was revised, giving her five 102-millimetre (4 in)/35-caliber guns, two 40-millimetre (1.6 in)/35-caliber guns, and four 450-millimetre (17.7 in) torpedo tubes, and, according to some sources, two 65-millimetre (2.6 in) machine guns. Her full-load displacement rose to 900 tonnes (886 long tons). On 1 October 1929 she was reclassified as a torpedo boat.

=== World War II ===
==== 1940–1941 ====
World War II broke out in September 1939 with Nazi Germany's invasion of Poland. Italy joined the war on the side of the Axis powers with its invasion of France on 10 June 1940. At the time, Antonio Mosto was part of the 9th Torpedo Boat Squadron along with the torpedo boats Canopo, Cassiopea, and Francesco Nullo, based at La Maddalena on the northern tip of Sardinia. In 1940 and 1941 she operated mainly along the coast of North Africa.

On 18 April 1941, Antonio Mosto and the torpedo boats Calliope and Giuseppe La Farina began escort duty for a convoy composed of the steamers Isarco, Nicolò Odero, and Maddalena Odero bound from Palermo, Sicily, to Tripoli, Libya. The torpedo boats Climene and Orione and the tankers Alberto Fassio and Luisiano later joined the convoy, which reached Tripoli on 21 April 1941.

Antonio Mosto, under the command of Tenente di vascello (Ship-of-the-Line Lieutenant) Aldo Crugnola, was moored at Tripoli on 9 July 1941 during a British air raid. One of the British aircraft, shot down by anti-aircraft fire, crashed on her deck, causing serious damage.

==== 1942–1943 ====
Antonio Mosto operated mostly off the coast of Italy during 1942 and 1943. At 13:00 on 28 March 1942, while under the command of (Deputy Corvette Captain) Gerolamo Delfino, she got underway from Patras, Greece along with the auxiliary cruiser Città di Napoli, the destroyer Sebenico, and the torpedo boats Angelo Bassini, Castelfidardo, and San Martino to escort a convoy composed of the troopships Aventino, Galilea, Francesco Crispi, Italia, Piemonte, and Viminale headed to Brindisi and then on to Bari, Italy, loaded with 8,300 troops. Francesco Crispi, Galilea, Piemonte, and Viminale were transporting elements of the 3rd Alpine Division "Julia" returning to Italy from Greece, while Aventino and Italia were carrying men from the garrisons of the Italian Dodecanese headed home on leave. After passing Lefkada (known to the Italians as Capo Dukato), the convoy arranged itself in a double column, with Viminale leading the port column, followed by Piemonte and then Aventino, while Galilea led the starboard column with Francesco Cripsi astern of her and Italia bringing up the rear. The escorts arranged themselves around the troopships, with Città di Napoli, (flagship of both the escort ships and the convoy as a whole) ahead, Angelo Bassini in the rear, San Martino and Castelfidardo on the port side, and Antonio Mosto and Sebenico to starboard, with the escorts zigzagging as they convoy proceeded. At 22:45 that day the British submarine HMS HMS Proteus torpedoed Galilea in the Ionian Sea 9 nautical miles (17 km; 10 mi) southwest of Antipaxos. Hit on her port bow, Galilea veered to port, lost speed, and went dead in the water 10 minutes after the torpedo hit her. As ordered before departure from Patras, the rest of the convoy continued its voyage, leaving only Antonio Mosto behind to counterattack Proteus with depth charges and assist Galilea. Galilea sank at 03:50 on 29 March at 39°04′N 020°05′E with the loss of either 991 or 995 lives, according to different sources. Only 284 or 319 men (according to different sources) survived, with Antonio Mosto rescuing about half of them. The rest of the convoy arrived safely at Bari on 29 March.

On 6 November 1942 Antonio Mosto left Taranto with Angelo Bassini and the torpedo boat Castore to escort the tanker Giorgio to Patras, from which Giorgio continued to Souda, Crete, under the escort of Castore alone.

Antonio Mosto suffered heavy damage during a devastating air raid by 92 bombers of United States Army Air Forces Twelfth Air Force on Leghorn (Livorno), Italy, on 28 May 1943. The raid sank or seriously damaged numerous other warships and merchant ships and killed 294 civilians.

==== 1943–1945 ====
On 8 September 1943, the Kingdom of Italy announced an armistice with the Allies and switched sides in the war, prompting Nazi Germany to begin Operation Achse, the disarmament by force of the Italian armed forces and the occupation of those portions of Italy not yet under Allied control. Antonio Mosto avoided capture by the Germans, moving first to Palermo, a port in the hands of the Allies, and then on 20 September 1943 to Malta along with many other Italian ships. She returned to Italy on 5 October 1943.

Antonio Mosto subsequently fought on the Allied side as a unit of the Italian Co-belligerent Navy through the end of the war in Europe in May 1945. She operated on escort duty in the waters of Tunisia during this period.

=== Post-World War II ===
Antonio Mosto remained in service after World War II, as a unit of the Regia Marina until the Italian monarchy was abolished in 1946 and then as part of the Italian Navy (Marina Militare) under the Italian Republic. She was reclassified as a minesweeper in 1953 and gven the new pennant number M 5335. The last Rosolino Pilo-class ship to leave service, she was stricken from the naval register on 15 December 1958 and subsequently scrapped.
