= Italian destroyer Rosolino Pilo =

Italian Rosolino Pilo-class destroyer

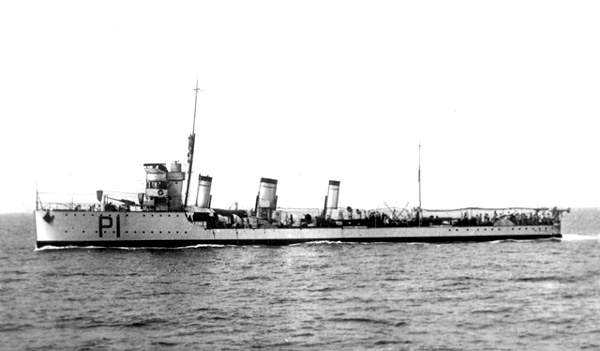

History

Kingdom of Italy
- Name: Rosolino Pilo
- Namesake: Rosolino Pilo (1820–1860), Italian patriot
- Builder: Cantieri navali Odero, Sestri Ponente, Kingdom of Italy
- Laid down: 19 August 1913
- Launched: 24 March 1915
- Commissioned: 25 May 1915
- Reclassified: Torpedo boat 1 October 1929
- Identification: Pennant number PI, PL
- Fate: To Italian Republic 1946
- Notes: Under Nazi German control 10–26 September 1943

Italian Republic
- Reclassified: Minesweeper 1952
- Stricken: 1 October 1954
- Identification: Pennant number M 5336 (1954)
- Fate: Scrapped

General characteristics
- Class & type: Rosolino Pilo-class destroyer
- Displacement: 912 tons (max); 770 tons (standard)
- Length: 73 m (240 ft)
- Beam: 7.3 m (24 ft)
- Draught: 2.3 m (7 ft 7 in)
- Installed power: 16,000 brake horsepower (11,931 kW)
- Propulsion: 1 × Tosi steam turbines; 4 × Thornycroft boilers
- Speed: 30 knots (56 km/h; 35 mph)
- Range: 1,200 nmi (2,200 km; 1,400 mi) at 14 knots (26 km/h; 16 mph)
- Complement: 69-79
- Armament: 1915–1918: 4 × 1 Cannon 76/40 Model 1916; 2 × 1 76mm/30 AA; 4 × 1 450 mm (17.7 in) torpedo tubes; 10 mines; 1919–1921: 5 × 1 102 mm (4.0 in)/35 guns; 2 × 1 - 40 mm/39 AA; 2 x 1 65-millimetre (2.6 in) machine guns; 4 × 1 450 mm (17.7 in) torpedo tubes

Rosolino Pilo was the lead ship of the Italian Rosolino Pilo-class destroyers. Commissioned into service in the Italian Regia Marina (Royal Navy) in 1915, she served in World War I, playing an active role in the Adriatic campaign and seeing action in the Battle of the Strait of Otranto in 1917. Reclassified as a torpedo boat in 1929, she served in the Mediterranean and Adriatic campaigns of World War II. Briefly captured by Nazi Germany in 1943, she served on the Allied side in the Italian Co-belligerent Navy for the remainder of the war. She served in the postwar Italian Navy (Marina Miltare) and was reclassified as a minesweeper in 1952. She was stricken in 1954.

== Construction and commissioning ==
Rosolino Pilo was laid down at the Cantieri navali Odero (English: Odero Shipyard) in Sestri Ponente, Italy, on 19 August 1913. She was launched on 24 March 1915 and completed and commissioned on 25 May 1915.

== Service history ==
=== World War I ===
==== 1915 ====
World War I broke out in 1914, and the Kingdom of Italy entered the war on the side of the Allies with its declaration of war on Austria-Hungary on 23 May 1915. Rosolino Pilo was commissioned two days after Italy declared war. On 6 August 1915, she damaged the Austro-Hungarian Navy submarine U-12 off Venice.

On 29 December 1915 Rosolino Pilo to join various formations of Allied warships in pursuing an Austro-Hungarian force composed of the scout cruiser Helgoland and the destroyers Balaton, Csepel, Lika, Tátra, and Triglav, which had bombarded the harbor at Durrës (known to the Italians as Durazzo) on the coast of the Principality of Albania, sinking the Greek steamer Mikael and two sailing ships while losing Lika, which struck a mine. Rosolino Pilo did not play a significant role in the subsequent clash, known as the First Battle of Durazzo, in which Helgoland and British and French cruisers suffered minor damage and French destroyers sank Triglav.

==== 1916 ====
On 23 February 1916, Rosolino Pilo, the British light cruiser HMS Liverpool, and the French destroyer Casque provided distant cover to a convoy of 12 steamers and two tugs in transit from Italy to Durrës. The Italian destroyers Bersagliere, Corazziere, and Garibaldino provided the convoy's direct escort.

On 13 June 1916 Rosolino Pilo and the destroyers Antonio Mosto, Audace, and Pilade Bronzetti provided escort and support to the motor torpedo boats MAS 5 and MAS 7, which, after the coastal torpedo boats 35 PN and 37 PN towed them to a starting position, penetrated the harbor at Austro-Hungarian-occupied Shëngjin (known to the Italians as San Giovanni di Medua) in Albania. The incursion was unsuccessful: MAS 5 and MAS 7 found no ships moored in the harbor, then withdrew under Austro-Hungarian artillery fire without suffering any damage. On the night of 25–26 June 1916, while Audace, the protected cruiser Marsala, and the destroyers Impavido, Insidioso, and Irrequieto operated in distant support, Rosolino Pilo, Antonio Mosto, Pilade Bronzetti, and the destroyer Giuseppe Cesare Abba escorted the coastal torpedo boats 34 PN and 36 PN as 34 PN and 36 PN towed MAS 5 and MAS 7 to a point 2.5 nautical miles (4.6 km; 2.9 mi) off Durrës. MAS 5 and MAS 7 then dropped their tow cables at 00:15 on 26 June and raided the harbor at Durrës, launching torpedoes at 01:45 and rejoining Rosolino Pilo′s formation at 02:40. The attack resulted in serious damage to the 1,111-gross register ton steamship Sarajevo, and all the Italian ships returned to base safely. During the night of 3–4 November 1916 Rosolino Pilo, Giuseppe Cesare Abba, and the destroyer Ippolito Nievo escorted 34 PN, 35 PN, and 37 PN as they towed MAS 6 and MAS 7 for another attack on Durrës, which failed because of the presence of torpedo nets in the harbor.

At 23:00 on 22 December 1916 Rosolino Pilo, under the command of Tenente di vascello (Ship-of-the-Line Lieutenant) Bombardini, got underway from Brindisi with Giuseppe Cesare Abba, and Ippolito Nievo and headed for Cape Rodoni to intercept the Austro-Hungarian destroyers Dinara, Reka, Scharfschutze, and Velebit, which had attacked the Otranto Barrage in the Strait of Otranto and were returning to the Austro-Hungarian Navy base at Cattaro after a clash with the French Navy destroyers Boutefeu, Casque, Commandant Bory, Commandant Rivière, Dehorter, and Protet. The Italian destroyers did not find the Austro-Hungarian ships, but did encounter the French destroyers. The two groups of Allied ships were unable to coordinate their maneuvers and confusion ensued, resulting in Casque colliding with Giuseppe Cesare Abba and then Boutefeu narrowly avoiding Rosolino Pilo and Ippolito Nievo and ramming Giuseppe Cesare Abba as well. All three damaged destroyers managed to return to port.

==== 1917–1918 ====
On the night of 14–15 May 1917, the Battle of the Strait of Otranto, the largest naval action of the Adriatic Campaign of World War I, began when the Austro-Hungarian Navy staged a two-pronged attack against the Otranto Barrage aimed both at destroying naval drifters — armed fishing boats that patrolled the anti-submarine barrier the barrage formed — and, as a diversionary action, at destroying an Italian convoy bound from Greece to Albania. At 04:50 on 15 May, following news of these attacks, Rosolino Pilo, the Italian destroyer Simone Schiaffino, and the British light cruiser HMS Dartmouth made ready for sea to intervene in the clash. After getting underway, they headed northeast to intercept the Austro-Hungarian ships. Around 08:10, combat began between the Austro-Hungarians and various Allied naval formations sent out to engage them. The Italian scout cruiser Aquila suffered a hit that immobilized her at around 09:05, and the Austro-Hungarian scout cruisers Helgoland, Novara, and Saida closed with her. Dartmouth, the British light cruiser HMS Bristol, Antonio Mosto, and the Italian destroyer Giovanni Acerbi placed themselves between Aquila and the Austro-Hungarian ships and opened fire on them at 09:30 at a range of 8,500 metres (9,300 yd). The three Austro-Hungarian ships retreated toward the northwest and the British and Italian ships pursued them at distances of between 4,500 and 10,000 metres (4,900 and 10,900 yd), continuing to fire. All the major warships suffered damage during the battle, but Rosolino Pilo′s formation had to discontinue the action and withdraw at 12:05 when it neared Cattaro, from which the Austro-Hungarian armored cruiser Sankt Georg and destroyers Tátra and Warasdiner had sortied to intervene in the engagement.

On 11 June 1917 Rosolino Pilo, Ippoliti Nievo, and 37 PN departed Brindisi and provided support to an attack against Durrës by nine seaplanes.

An Austro-Hungarian Navy force consisting of Helgoland and the destroyers Balaton, Csepel, Lika, Orjen, Tátra, and Triglav left Cattaro on 18 October 1917 to attack Italian convoys. The Austro-Hungarians found no convoys, so Helgoland and Lika moved within sight of Brindisi to entice Italian ships into chasing them and lure the Italians into an ambush by the Austro-Hungarian submarines U-32 and U-40. At 06:30 on 19 October 1917, the destroyer Insidioso, the scout cruisers Alessandro Poerio and Guglielmo Pepe, and the destroyers Pilade Bronzetti and Simone Schiaffino got underway from Brindisi to pursue the Austro-Hungarians, and Rosolino Pilo, Ippolito Nievo, and the British light cruiser HMS Weymouth diverted from a voyage from Vlorë (known to the Italians as Valona), Albania, to Brindisi to join the pursuit. After a long chase which also saw some Italian air attacks on the Austro-Hungarian ships, the Austro-Hungarians escaped and all the Italian ships returned to port without damage.

By late October 1918, Austria-Hungary had effectively disintegrated, and the Armistice of Villa Giusti, signed on 3 November 1918, went into effect on 4 November 1918 and brought hostilities between Austria-Hungary and the Allies to an end. On 5 November 1918, Rosolino Pilo, Giuseppe Cesare Abba, the battleship Ammiraglio di Saint Bon, and the destroyers Giuseppe La Masa and Giuseppe Missori entered the port at Pola, the site of an important Austro-Hungarian Navy base, after which units embarked on the ships occupied the city over the following days. World War I ended with the armistice between the Allies and the German Empire on 11 November 1918.

=== Interwar period ===
After the end of World War I, Rosolino Pilo′s armament was revised, giving her five 102-millimetre (4 in)/35-caliber guns, two 40-millimetre (1.6 in)/35-caliber guns, and four 450-millimetre (17.7 in) torpedo tubes. Her full-load displacement rose to 900 tonnes (886 long tons). Reclassified as a torpedo boat in 1929, she saw wide use during the 1920s and 1930s.

=== World War II ===
==== 1940–1942 ====
World War II broke out in September 1939 with Nazi Germany's invasion of Poland. Italy joined the war on the side of the Axis powers with its invasion of France on 10 June 1940. At the time, Rosolino Pilo was part of the 6th Torpedo Boat Squadron, along with Giuseppe Missori, Giuseppe Sirtori, and the torpedo boat Francesco Stocco. During the war, she mainly served as an escort.

On 27–28 June 1940, Rosolino Pilo and Giuseppe Missori transported supplies and 52 soldiers from Taranto, Italy, to Tripoli, Libya. In July 1940,Rosolino Pilo took part in Operation TCM, the escort of the first large convoy from Italy to Libya, consisting of the troopships Calitea, with 619 soldiers aboard, and Esperia, carrying 1,571 troops, and the modern cargo ships Francesco Barbaro, Marco Foscarini, and Vettor Pisani, whose combined cargo consisted of 232 vehicles, 5,720 tonnes (5,630 long tons; 6,305 short tons) of fuels and lubricants, and 10,445 tonnes (10,280 long tons; 11,514 short tons) of other materials. After the rest of the convoy got underway from Naples at 19:45 on 6 July, Rosolino Pilo and her sister ship Giuseppe Cesare Abba left Catania on 7 July escorting Francesco Barbaro. After rendezvousing with the rest of the convoy, Rosolino Pilo and Giuseppe Cesare Abba became part of the direct escort along with the 14th Torpedo Boat Squadron, consisting of the torpedo boats Orione, Orsa, Pegaso, and Procione. With the light cruisers Giovanni dalle Bande Nere and Bartolomeo Colleoni and the destroyers Grecale, Libeccio, Maestrale, and Scirocco in distant support, the convoy arrived safely at Benghazi, Libya, on 8 July.

On 25 February 1941 Rosolino Pilo escorted from Palermo, Sicily, to Tripoli a convoy initially composed of the steam cargo ships Honor and Santa Paola, with the tanker Caucaso joining the convoy after leaving Bizerte in French Tunisia. On 22 May 1942, Rosolino Pilo and the destroyer Francesco Crispi were escorting a convoy composed of the steamers Balcan and Chisone when the Italians sighted an incoming torpedo. After avoiding the torpedo, Rosolino Pilo, presuming the convoy to be under attack by an unidentified submarine, fired a torpedo in return, which exploded. The Italians believed that her torpedo had struck a submerged submarine, but a subsequent investigation revealed that Rosolino Pilo′s torpedo had exploded against the wreck of the auxiliary cruiser Attilio Deffenu.

==== 1943–1945 ====
On 8 September 1943, the Kingdom of Italy announced an armistice with the Allies and switched sides in the war, prompting Nazi Germany to begin Operation Achse, the disarmament by force of the Italian armed forces and the occupation of those portions of Italy not yet under Allied control. At the time, Rosolino Pilo, under the command of Tenente di vascello (Ship-of-the-Line Lieutenant) Giuseppe Tullio Faggioni, was at Durrës on the coast of the Italian Protectorate of Albania. At 18:30 on 8 September her chief radio operator received the announcement of the armistice and informed the ship's executive officer, Sottotenente di vascello (Ship-of-the-Line Sublieutenant) Giovanni Buizza. Rosolino Pilo joined Giuseppe Missori and the steamer Marco in bombarding German positions, but German troops captured her on 10 September l1943. The Germans looted the ship. Some members of her crew attempted to escape in a rowboat; the Germans recaptured them, but Albanian partisans and other Italian military personnel freed them.

Between the late morning and afternoon of 25 September 1943 the Italian Royal Army's 11th Infantry Division "Brennero", captured by the Germans, was embarked on captured Italian ships at Durrës, namely, Rosolino Pilo, Giueseppe Missori, the auxiliary cruiser Arborea, and the steamers Argentina and Italia. Rosolino Pilo took aboard between 20 and 35 men who were former members of an artillery battery of the garrison, and left Durrës for Trieste at around 19:00 in convoy with the other Italian ships. German guards had embarked aboard each ship, including Rosolino Pilo, to monitor their crews. Rosolino Pilo′s crew and the Italian soldiers aboard her, unarmed but much more numerous than the Germans, made plans to overwhelm the Germans on board — who were distributed partly at the bow, partly at the stern, and partly on the bridge — and regain control of the ship, then steam her to an Italian port. They implemented the plan at midnight on 25–26 September 1943: After pretending to have sighted a submarine and sounding a siren to distract the German guards, a large number of Italians rushed onto Rosolino Pilo′s deck. After a violent scuffle, the non-commissioned officer commanding the German guards was disarmed and killed, three other German soldiers were thrown overboard, and the remaining four Germans were wounded and captured. Rosolino Pilo initially set course for Cape Linguetta on the Karaburun Peninsula on the coast of Albania in order to evade German forces searching for her, then headed for Brindisi, where she arrived on 26 September 1943. For his actions, Faggioni received a Silver Medal of Military Valor, while other members of the crew who had played an important role in the fight against the German guards received a total of five Bronze Medals of Military Valor and 16 War Merit Crosses.

After her arrival in Brindisi, Rosolino Pilo fought on the Allied side as a unit of the Italian Co-belligerent Navy through the end of the war in Europe in May 1945. She carried out a total of 45 escort missions during this period.

=== Post-World War II ===
Rosolino Pilo remained in service after World War II, as a unit of the Regia Marina until the Italian monarchy was abolished in 1946 and then as part of the Italian Navy (Marina Militare) under the Italian Republic. She was reclassified as a minesweeper in 1952. She was stricken from the naval register on 1 October 1954 and subsequently scrapped.

== Bibliography ==
- Favre, Franco (2008). La Marina nella Grande Guerra. Le operazioni navali, aeree, subacquee e terrestri in Adriatico [The Navy in the Great War. Naval, Aerial, Submarine and Land Operations in the Adriatic] (in Italian). Udine: Gaspari. ISBN 978-8-87-541135-0.
- Fraccaroli, Aldo (1970). Italian Warships of World War 1. London: Ian Allan. ISBN 0-7110-0105-7.
- Giorgerini, Giorgio (2002). La guerra italiana sul mare. La marina tra vittoria e sconfitta, 1940–1943 [The Italian War at Sea. The Navy between Victory and Defeat, 1940–1943] (in Italian). Mondadori. ISBN 978-88-04-50150-3.
