= Italian destroyer Indomito (1912) =

Italian destroyer of World War I

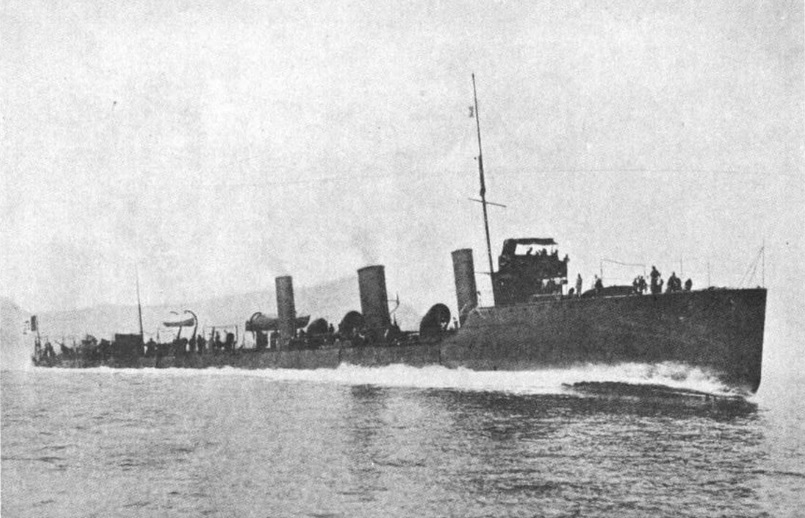
- Indomito sometime between 1912 and 1914.

History

Kingdom of Italy
- Name: Indomito
- Namesake: "Indomito"
- Builder: Cantiere Pattison, Naples, Kingdom of Italy
- Laid down: 1910
- Launched: 10 May 1912
- Commissioned: 1913
- Reclassified: Torpedo boat 1929
- Stricken: 11 July 1937
- Identification: Pennant number ID
- Fate: Discarded and scrapped

General characteristics
- Type: Destroyer
- Displacement: 672–770 metric tons (741–849 short tons)
- Length: 237 ft 11 in (72.52 m) (wl); 239 ft 6 in (73.00 m) (oa)
- Beam: 24 ft (7.3 m)
- Draft: 7 ft 11 in (2.41 m)
- Propulsion: 2 shafts; 2 × Tosi steam turbines; 4 × Thornycroft boilers; 16,000 hp (11,931 kW) designed/17,620 shp (13,139 kW) maximum
- Speed: 30 knots (56 km/h; 35 mph) designed; 35.79 knots (66.28 km/h; 41.19 mph) maximum
- Endurance: 1,200 nmi (2,200 km; 1,400 mi) at 14 knots (26 km/h; 16 mph); 500 nmi (930 km; 580 mi) at 25 knots (46 km/h; 29 mph); 350 nmi (650 km; 400 mi) at 30 knots (56 km/h; 35 mph)
- Complement: 4–5 officers, 65–74 enlisted men
- Armament: As built: 1 × 4.7 in (120 mm) gun 4 × 3 in (76.2 mm) guns 2 × 17.7 in (450 mm) torpedo tubes After refit: 5 × 4 in (102 mm) guns 1 × 40 mm (1.6 in) AA gun 2 × 17.7 in (450 mm) torpedo tubes

Indomito (English: "Indomitable") was an Italian Indomito-class destroyer. Commissioned into service in the Italian Regia Marina (Royal Navy) in 1913, she served in World War I, playing an active role in the Adriatic campaign and seeing action in the Battle of the Strait of Otranto in 1917. Reclassified as a torpedo boat in 1929, she was stricken in 1937 and subsequently scrapped.

== Construction and commissioning ==
Indomito was laid down at the Cantiere Pattison (English: Pattison Shipyard) in Naples, Italy, in 1910. She was launched on 10 May 1912 and commissioned in 1913.

== Service history ==
=== World War I ===
==== 1915 ====
World War I broke out in 1914, and the Kingdom of Italy entered the war on the side of the Allies with its declaration of war on Austria-Hungary on 23 May 1915. At the time, Indomito, under the command of Capitano di corvetta (Corvette Captain) Lodolo, and the destroyers Impavido, Impetuoso, Insidioso, Intrepido, and Irrequieto made up the 2nd Destroyer Squadron. The squadron, under the command of Capitano de fregata (Frigate Captain) P. Orsini, was based at Taranto, although either Indomito or Impetuoso or both were visiting La Spezia that day. On 9 June 1915, Indomito, Impetuoso, Insidioso, Intrepido, Irrequieto, the protected cruiser Quarto, and the destroyers Animoso, Ardente, Ardito, and Audace escorted the armored cruisers Giuseppe Garibaldi and Vettor Pisani as they participated in the bombardment of the lighthouses at the Cape of Rodon and Shëngjin (known to the Italians as San Giovanni di Medua) on the coast of the Principality of Albania.

On 22 November 1915 Indomito and other ships of her squadron transported a British commissariat commission. The Italian destroyers interrupted their voyage to pursue Austro-Hungarian Navy ships that had sunk the motor sailing ship Gallinara and the steamship Palatino, but were unable to engage them.

On 3 December 1915 Indomito, Impetuoso , Insidioso, Intrepido, and Irrequieto got underway from Brindisi to escort one of the first supply convoys for Italian troops in Albania. As the convoy — composed of the troop transports Re Umberto and Valparaiso, carrying a total of 1,800 men and 150 draft animals — approached Shëngjin (known to the Italians as San Giovanni di Medua) on the coast of Albania, Re Umberto, with 765 men on board, hit a mine laid by the Imperial German Navy submarine UC-14, broke in two, and sank in 15 minutes. Rescuers saved 712 men.

On 9 December 1915 Indomito and the destroyer Euro escorted the auxiliary ship Sterope from Taranto to Vlorë (known to the Italians as Valona) in Albania.

==== 1916 ====
On 23 February 1916 Indomito, Impetuoso, Ardito, and the protected cruisers Libia and Puglia positioned themselves in the harbor at Durrës (known to the Italians as Durazzo) in Albania to protect the withdrawal of the "Savona" Brigade.

At 21:00 on 11 December 1916 Indomito and Ardente got underway from Vlorë to escort the battleship Regina Margherita to Italy, but shortly after departure Regina Margherita hit two mines less than 2 nautical miles (3.7 km; 2.3 mi) from Vlorë, capsized, and sank in just seven minutes with the loss of 674 lives. Only 275 members of her crew were saved. Later in December 1916 Indomito underwent repairs at the Venetian Arsenal in Venice.

==== 1917 ====
On the night of 14–15 May 1917, the Battle of the Strait of Otranto began when the Austro-Hungarian Navy staged a two-pronged attack against the Otranto Barrage in the Strait of Otranto aimed both at destroying naval drifters — armed fishing boats that patrolled the anti-submarine barrier the barrage formed — and, as a diversionary action, at destroying an Italian convoy bound from Greece to Albania. At 04:10 on 15 May, after receiving news of the attack, Indomito, Impavido, Insidioso, the protected cruiser Marsala, the scout cruisers Aquila and Carlo Alberto Racchia, and the British Royal Navy light cruiser HMS Liverpool made ready for sea at Brindisi. At 05:30 the formation left Brindisi together with the British light cruiser HMS Dartmouth and two other destroyers, and at 07:45 the Allied force sighted the Austro-Hungarian destroyers Balaton and Csepel. Aquila and the Italian destroyers steered to attack the two Austro-Hungarian ships at 08:10 and opened fire on them at 08:15. In the ensuing exchange of gunfire, Balaton suffered damage and Aquila was hit and immobilized immediately afterwards. The two Austro-Hungarian destroyers ultimately took shelter under the cover of Austro-Hungarian coastal artillery batteries, forcing the Italian ships to give up the pursuit. Following a clash in which other Italian and Austro-Hungarian ships also participated, the battle ended with some ships damaged on both sides, but none sunk.

On 9 June 1917 Indomito, now under the command of an officer named Da Sacco, escorted a convoy of merchant ships headed to Plataria, Parga, Murzo, and Igoumenitsa in the Epirus region of Greece carrying 1,700 men, 200 draft animals, and 300 tons of supplies. On 16 July 1917 Indomito, Impavido, Insidioso, Carlo Alberto Racchia, and the scout cruiser Augusto Riboty operated in distant support of an Italian air attack against Durrës carried out by 18 aircraft flying from Brindisi and Vlorë and supported by the torpedo boats Ardea and Pegaso.

An Austro-Hungarian Navy force consisting of the scout cruiser Helgoland and the destroyers Balaton, Csepel, Lika, Orjen, Tátra, and Triglav left Cattaro on 18 October 1917 to attack Italian convoys. The Austro-Hungarians found no convoys, so Heligoland and Lika moved within sight of Brindisi to entice Italian ships into chasing them and lure the Italians into an ambush by the Austro-Hungarian submarines U-32 and U-40. Indomito got underway from Brindisi with Aquila, the scout cruiser Sparviero, the destroyers Antonio Mosto and Giuseppe Missori, the British light cruisers HMS Gloucester and HMS Newcastle, and the French Navy destroyers Bisson, Commandant Bory, and Commandant Rivière to join other Italian ships in pursuit of the Austro-Hungarians, but after a long chase which also saw some Italian air attacks on the Austro-Hungarian ships, the Austro-Hungarians escaped and all the Italian ships returned to port without damage.

==== 1918 ====
Indomito, the scout cruisers Guglielmo Pepe and Cesare Rossarol, and the destroyer Ippolito Nievo were assigned to support a raid against Durrës on the night of 10–11 February 1918 by the motor torpedo boats MAS 9 and MAS 20, towed by the coastal torpedo boats 37 PN and 38 PN. Bad weather forced the cancellation of the raid.

By late October 1918, Austria-Hungary had effectively disintegrated, and the Armistice of Villa Giusti, signed on 3 November 1918, went into effect on 4 November 1918 and brought hostilities between Austria-Hungary and the Allies to an end. World War I ended a week later with an armistice between the Allies and the German Empire on 11 November 1918.

=== Post-World War I ===
After the end of World War I, Indomito′s armament was revised, giving her five 102 mm (4 in)/35-caliber guns, a single 40 mm (1.6 in)/35-caliber gun, and four 450-millimetre (17.7 in) torpedo tubes. She was reclassified as a torpedo boat in 1929 and stricken from the naval register 11 July 1937.
