= Italian destroyer Intrepido (1912) =

Italian destroyer of World War I

History

Kingdom of Italy
- Name: Intrepido
- Namesake: "Intrepid"
- Builder: Cantiere Pattison, Naples, Kingdom of Italy
- Laid down: 1 June 1910
- Launched: 7 August 1912
- Commissioned: 6 February 1913
- Motto: Intrepido maxime ardua ("Arduous undertakings befit the intrepid") (motto of Gabriele D'Annunzio)
- Fate: Sunk 4 December 1915

General characteristics
- Type: Destroyer
- Displacement: 672–770 metric tons (741–849 short tons)
- Length: 237 ft 11 in (72.52 m) (wl); 239 ft 6 in (73.00 m) (oa)
- Beam: 24 ft (7.3 m)
- Draft: 7 ft 11 in (2.41 m)
- Propulsion: 2 shafts; 2 × Tosi steam turbines; 4 × Thornycroft boilers; 16,000 hp (11,931 kW) designed/17,620 shp (13,139 kW) maximum
- Speed: 30 knots (56 km/h; 35 mph) designed; 35.79 knots (66.28 km/h; 41.19 mph) maximum
- Endurance: 1,200 nmi (2,200 km; 1,400 mi) at 14 knots (26 km/h; 16 mph); 500 nmi (930 km; 580 mi) at 25 knots (46 km/h; 29 mph); 350 nmi (650 km; 400 mi) at 30 knots (56 km/h; 35 mph)
- Complement: 4–5 officers, 65–74 enlisted men
- Armament: As built: 1 × 4.7 in (120 mm) gun 4 × 3 in (76.2 mm) guns 2 × 17.7 in (450 mm) torpedo tubes

Intrepido (English: "Intrepid") was an Italian Indomito-class destroyer. Commissioned into service in the Italian Regia Marina (Royal Navy) in 1913, she served in World War I, playing an active role in the Adriatic campaign until she was sunk in 1915.

== Construction and commissioning ==
Intrepido was laid down at the Cantiere Pattison (English: Pattison Shipyard) in Naples, Italy, on 1 June 1910. She was launched on 7 August 1912 and commissioned on 6 February 1913.

== Service history ==
=== 1913–1914 ===
Intrepido was assigned to the 3rd Destroyer Squadron. After shakedown and training, she took part in various cruises in the Eastern and Western Mediterranean Sea during 1913. She was transferred to the 2nd Destroyer Squadron in 1914 and during that year engaged in minesweeping operations, searching for stray mines in the southern Adriatic Sea.

=== World War I ===
World War I broke out in 1914, and the Kingdom of Italy entered the war on the side of the Allies with its declaration of war on Austria-Hungary on 23 May 1915. At the time, Intrepido, under the command of Capitano di corvetta (Corvette Captain) De Grenet, and the destroyers Indomito, Impavido, Impetuoso, Insidioso, and Irrequieto made up the 2nd Destroyer Squadron. The squadron, under the command of Capitano de fregata (Frigate Captain) P. Orsini, was based at Taranto, although either Impetuoso or Indomito or both were visiting La Spezia that day.

On 5 June 1915, Intrepido escorted the British Royal Navy light cruiser HMS Dublin as Dublin bombarded Donzella on the coast of Dalmatia. On 9 June 1915, Intrepido, Impetuoso, Indomito, Insidioso, Irrequieto, the protected cruiser Quarto, and the destroyers Animoso, Ardente, Ardito, and Audace escorted the armored cruisers Giuseppe Garibaldi and Vettor Pisani as they participated in a bombardment of the lighthouses at the Cape of Rodon and Shëngjin (known to the Italians as San Giovanni di Medua) on the coast of the Principality of Albania.

In the early hours of 17 July 1915 Intrepido, Animoso, Irrequieto, and Quarto bombarded the radiotelegraph station and other Austro-Hungarian military installations on Šipan (known to the Italians as Giuppana), an island off the coast of Dalmatia. The bombardment, as well as another one carried out by the 5th Naval Division, was interrupted when the armored cruiser Vettor Pisani of the 5th Naval Division sighted an Austro-Hungarian submarine at 04:25. After the Italian ships began their return voyage to Italy, the Austro-Hungarian submarine U-4 attacked at 04:40 and torpedoed Giuseppe Garibaldi, which sank within minutes. Intrepido took part in the rescue effort, which saved 525 men out of the 578 on board Giuseppe Garibaldi.

A few hours after an Austro-Hungarian Navy force subjected the Palagruža (known to the Italians as the Pelagosa) archipelago in the Adriatic Sea to a heavy bombardment during the night of 16–17 August 1915, Intrepido, Impavido, Quarto, Animoso, and Ardito, which were on a cruise in the Adriatic Sea north of the line Brindisi–Cattaro, interrupted their operations to respond. They reached Palagruža at around 10:00 on 17 August 1915.

On 3 December 1915 Intrepido — now under the command of Capitano di corvetta (Corvette Captain) Leva — along with Impetuoso , Indomito, Insidioso, and Irrequieto got underway from Brindisi to escort one of the first supply convoys for Italian troops in Albania. As the convoy — composed of the troop transports Re Umberto and Valparaiso, carrying a total of 1,800 men and 150 draft animals — approached Shëngjin on the coast of Albania, Re Umberto, with 765 men on board, hit a mine laid by the Imperial German Navy submarine UC-14, broke in two, and sank in 15 minutes. Rescuers saved 712 men, of whom Intrepido rescued about a hundred.

After disembarking the survivors at Vlorë (known to the Italians as Valona) in Albania, Intrepido got back underway to carry out an anti-submarine patrol. At 14:00 on 4 December 1915, while returning from her patrol, Intrepido struck a mine south of the Karaburun Peninsula on the coast of Albania. The explosion blew off her bow and tore apart her forward superstructure, killing one officer and three enlisted men and wounding others, including Leva, who suffered serious injuries. Intrepido′s crew beached her near Point Linguetta to prevent her from sinking, but she was deemed unsalvageable. She was stripped of her guns, torpedo tubes, and other useful equipment and abandoned. A few days later her wreck sank in deeper water.

== Wreck ==
Intrepido′s wreck was identified on the seabed near Point Linguetta in April 2007. It is partially destroyed, with debris scattered over an area of approximately 32 square metres (38 sq yd).
