= Indomito-class destroyer =

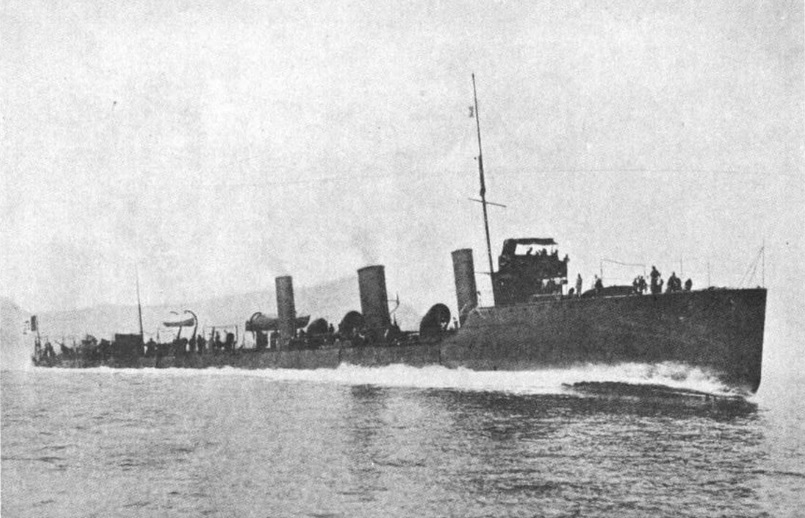
- Indomito, c. 1912–1914

Class overview
- Name: Indomito class
- Builders: Societa Pattison, Naples
- Operators: Regia Marina
- Preceded by: Soldato class
- Succeeded by: Ardito class
- Built: 1910–1913
- In commission: 1913–1937
- Completed: 8
- Lost: 3
- Retired: 5

General characteristics
- Type: Destroyer
- Displacement: 672–770 metric tons (741–849 short tons)
- Length: 237 ft 11 in (72.52 m) (wl); 239 ft 6 in (73.00 m) (oa)
- Beam: 24 ft (7.3 m)
- Draft: 7 ft 11 in (2.41 m)
- Propulsion: 2 shafts; 2 × Tosi steam turbines; 4 × Thornycroft boilers; 16,000 hp (12,000 kW) designed/17,620 shp (13,140 kW) maximum
- Speed: 30 knots (56 km/h; 35 mph) designed; 35.79 knots (66.28 km/h; 41.19 mph) maximum
- Endurance: 1,200 nmi (2,200 km; 1,400 mi) at 14 knots (26 km/h; 16 mph); 500 nmi (930 km) at 25 kn (46 km/h); 350 nmi (650 km) at 30 kn (56 km/h)
- Complement: 4–5 officers, 65–74 sailors
- Armament: As built: 1 × 4.7 in (120 mm) gun 4 × 3 in (76 mm) guns 2 × 17.7 in (450 mm) torpedo tubes After refit: 5 × 4 in (100 mm) guns 1 × 40 mm (1.6 in) AA gun 2 × 17.7 in (450 mm) torpedo tubes

The Indomito class was a class of destroyers of the Italian Royal Navy (Italian: Règia Marina) before and during World War I. Eight were built, six of which at Naples by Societa Pattison, between 1910 and 1913. They were the first large Italian destroyers and the first fitted with steam turbines. The class is sometimes also called the I class. Two of the class were sunk during World War I, but the four surviving ships remained in service until 1937–38. One of the class, Insidioso, was reinstated during World War II and served in the Règia Marina and the German Kriegsmarine before being sunk by U.S. aircraft in late 1944.

== Design and construction ==
The Indomito class was designed by Luigi Scaglia of Societa Pattison of Naples. The boats were the first large destroyers of the Règia Marina and the first fitted with steam turbines. The Indomito class were the first in the progression of Italian destroyers to be called either tre pipe or tre canne for their three funnels. (Note: Future destroyers, until the 1921–22 Generali class, were also called tre pipe or tre canne. See: Fraccaroli, p. 268)

The ships were 237 feet 11 inches (72.52 m) at the waterline (239 feet 6 inches (73.00 m) overall) with a beam of 24 feet (7.3 m) and a draft of 7 feet 11 inches (2.41 m). They had twin shafts driven by two Tosi steam turbines that were fired by four Thornycroft boilers. The drivetrain was designed for a power output of 16,000 horsepower (12,000 kW) to move the ships at 30 knots (56 km/h; 35 mph), but had a maximum output of 17,620 shaft horsepower (13,140 kW) which propelled the ships at 35.79 knots (66.28 km/h).

As built, the ships were armed with one 4.7 in (120 mm)/40 gun, four 3 in (76 mm)/40 guns, and two 17.7 in (450 mm) torpedo tubes. In 1914 they were augmented with an additional two torpedo tubes. During World War I, guide rails for laying up to ten mines were added to the ships. Later wartime changes replaced all the guns with five 4 in (100 mm)/35 and a single 40 mm (1.6 in)/39 AA gun. Oil capacity was also increased during the war from 100 metric tons (110 short tons) to 128 metric tons (141 short tons) in order to increase endurance, but the increased weight had the opposite effect: slowing the ships and reduced their endurance.

== Service career ==
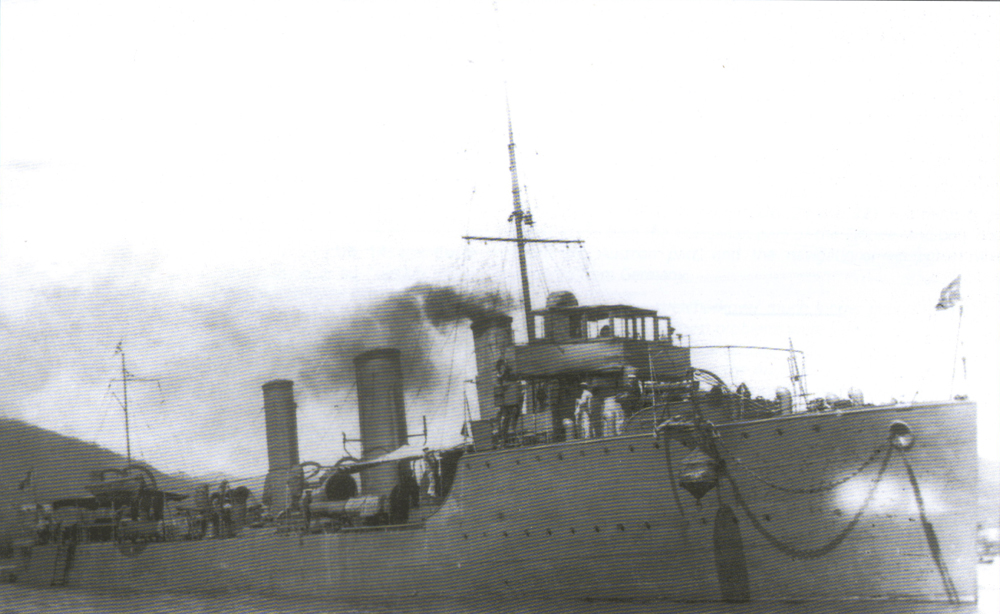
Regia Marina destroyer Impetuoso

All of the Indomito class saw action during World War I, with two of the ships, Impetuoso and Intrepido, sunk during the war. The remaining four ships all survived the war and were reclassified as torpedo boats in 1929. The remaining four ships were stricken 1937–38. Insidioso, however, was reinstated on 1 March 1941. Reduced to two funnels and rearmed, she served as a target ship, a convoy escort, and served in an anti-submarine warfare role. She was scuttled by her crew on 10 September 1943 at Pola, but was raised by the Germans who commissioned her as Wildfang on 8 November. Wildfang, the last surviving member of the Indomito class, was sunk by U.S. aircraft on 5 November 1944 after just under one year of German service.

=== Ships ===
Ship	Builder	Laid down	Launched	Completed	Operational History
Ardente (AE)	Orlando, Livorno	4 April 1912	15 December 1912	15 August 1913	Stricken 12 October 1937
Ardito	Orlando, Livorno	1912	20 October 1912	1914	Stricken in summer 1931
Impavido (IV)	Pattison, Naples	1911	22 March 1913	1914	Stricken 1 September 1937
Impetuoso	Pattison, Naples	1910	23 July 1913	1914	Sunk 10 July 1916 by Austro-Hungarian U-boat U-17
Indomito (ID)	Pattison, Naples	1910	10 May 1912	20 January 1913	Stricken 11 July 1937
Insidioso (IS)	Pattison, Naples	1912	30 September 1913	1914	Stricken 18 September 1938. Reinstated as a target ship and convoy escort on 1 March 1941 but scuttled at Pola on 10 September 1943; raised and renamed Wildfang by Germany, but sunk by U.S. aircraft on 5 November 1944
Intrepido	Pattison, Naples	1910	7 August 1912	1913	Sunk 4 December 1915 by a mine from German U-boat UC-14
Irrequieto (IR)	Pattison, Naples	1910	12 December 1912	1913	Stricken 11 October 1937

== Bibliography ==
- Fraccaroli, Aldo (1985). "Italy". In Gray, Randal (ed.). Conway's All the World's Fighting Ships 1906–1921. Annapolis: Naval Institute Press. pp. 252–290. ISBN 978-0-87021-907-8.
