= Rosolino Pilo-class destroyer =

Class of destroyers of the Italian Regia Marina

Pilo Class
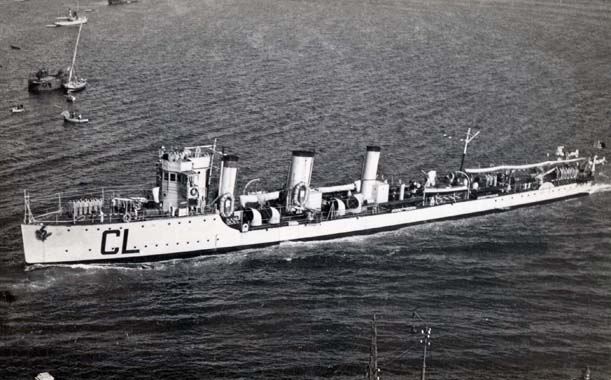
- Fratelli Cairoli underway

Class overview
- Name: Pilo class
- Builders: Odero, Sestri Ponente; Pattison, Naples
- Operators: Regia Marina (1916–1943); Kriegsmarine (1943–1944)
- Succeeded by: Generali-class destroyer
- Built: 1913 - 1916
- In service: 1915 - 1958
- Completed: 8
- Lost: 4
- Retired: 4

General characteristics
- Class & type: Pilo class torpedo boat
- Displacement: 912 tons (max); 770 tons (standard)
- Length: 73 m (240 ft)
- Beam: 7.3 m (24 ft)
- Draught: 2.3 m (7 ft 7 in)
- Installed power: 16,000 brake horsepower (12,000 kW)
- Propulsion: 1 × Tosi steam turbines; 4 × Thornycroft boilers
- Speed: 30 knots (56 km/h; 35 mph)
- Range: 1,200 nmi (2,200 km; 1,400 mi) at 14 knots (26 km/h; 16 mph)
- Complement: 69-79
- Armament: 1915–1918: 4 × 1 Cannon 76/40 Model 1916; 2 × 1 76mm/30 AA; 4 × 1 450mm torpedo tubes; 10 mines; 1919–1921: 5 × 1 102 mm (4.0 in)/35 guns; 2 × 1 - 40 mm/39 AA; 4 × 1 450mm torpedo tubes

The Rosolino Pilo (Note: Also known as the Pilo class) class was a class of eight destroyers of the Italian Regia Marina (Royal Navy) constructed before and during the First World War. Like other obsolete Italian destroyers, they were reclassified as torpedo boats in 1929, and seven ships served throughout the Second World War. Two ships were sunk by mines while under Italian service during the Second World War, with two more being seized by Nazi Germany following the Italian Armistice in 1943. The remaining three ships survived the war and continued in use with the post-war Italian Navy, with the last two of the class being decommissioned in 1958.

== German capture ==
Following Italy's surrender on 8 September 1943, Germany captured two of the Pilo-class vessels. Giuseppe Missori was renamed TA22, and Giuseppe Dezza was renamed TA35. These vessels were re-designated as torpedo boats and put into service with the Kriegsmarine. TA22 was attacked by the all-African American fighter group, the Tuskegee Airmen, who put her out of action. TA35 was sunk on 17 August 1944.

== Ships ==
| Name | Pennant | Builder | Laid down | Launched | Completed | Operational History |
|---|---|---|---|---|---|---|
| Rosolino Pilo | PN | Odero, Sestri Ponente | 19 August 1913 | 24 March 1915 | 25 May 1915 | Stricken October 1954 |
| Giuseppe Cesare Abba | AB | Odero, Sestri Ponente | 19 August 1913 | 25 May 1915 | 6 July 1915 | Stricken September 1958 |
| Pilade Bronzetti | BR | Odero, Sestri Ponente | 12 September 1913 | 26 October 1915 | 1 January 1916 | Renamed Giuseppe Dezza 16 January 1921. Scuttled 16 September 1943, but refloated by German Navy asTA35, re-commissioning 9 June 1944. Sunk by mine 17 August 1944 but again refloated. Scuttled 3 May 1945. |
| Giuseppe Missori | MS | Odero, Sestri Ponente | 19 January 1914 | 20 December 1915 | 7 March 1916 | Captured by Germany 10 September 1943, renamed TA22. Scuttled 3 May 1945. |
| Antonio Mosto | MO, MT | Pattison, Naples | 9 October 1913 | 20 May 1915 | 7 July 1915 | Minesweeper 1953. Stricken 15 December 1958. |
| Ippolito Nievo | NV | Odero, Sestri Ponente | 19 August 1913 | 24 July 1915 | 1 October 1915 | Stricken 24 April 1938. |
| Francesco Nullo | CL | Pattison, Naples | 24 September 1913 | 12 November 1914 | 1 May 1915 | Renamed Fratelli Cairoli 16 January 1921. Sunk by mine off Libya 23 September 1940. |
| Simone Schiaffino | SF, SH | Odero, Sestri Ponente | 12 September 1913 | 11 September 1915 | 7 November 1915 | She seized the Greek steamer Athinai off Messina on 20 October 1940 Sunk by an Italian mine off Cap Bon 24 April 1941. |

== See also ==
- Rosolino Pilo
