= Italian destroyer Insidioso =

Italian Indomito-class destroyer

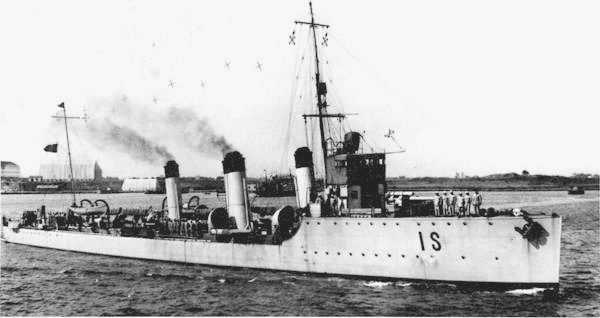

History

Kingdom of Italy
- Name: Insidioso
- Namesake: "Insidious"
- Builder: Cantiere Pattison, Naples, Kingdom of Italy
- Laid down: 1912
- Launched: 30 September 1913
- Commissioned: 1914
- Reclassified: Torpedo boat 1929
- Identification: Pennant number IS
- Stricken: 1938
- Reinstated: 1941
- Fate: Captured by Nazi Germany 10 September 1943

History

Nazi Germany
- Name: TA21
- Acquired: 10 September 1943
- Fate: Sunk 5 November 1944; Refloated and scrapped 1947

General characteristics
- Type: Destroyer
- Displacement: 672–770 metric tons (741–849 short tons)
- Length: 237 ft 11 in (72.52 m) (wl); 239 ft 6 in (73.00 m) (oa)
- Beam: 24 ft (7.3 m)
- Draft: 7 ft 11 in (2.41 m)
- Propulsion: 2 shafts; 2 × Tosi steam turbines; 4 × Thornycroft boilers; 16,000 hp (11,931 kW) designed/17,620 shp (13,139 kW) maximum
- Speed: 30 knots (56 km/h; 35 mph) designed; 35.79 knots (66.28 km/h; 41.19 mph) maximum
- Endurance: 1,200 nmi (2,200 km; 1,400 mi) at 14 knots (26 km/h; 16 mph); 500 nmi (930 km; 580 mi) at 25 knots (46 km/h; 29 mph); 350 nmi (650 km; 400 mi) at 30 knots (56 km/h; 35 mph)
- Complement: 4–5 officers, 65–74 enlisted men
- Armament: As built: 1 × 4.7 in (120 mm) gun 4 × 3 in (76.2 mm) guns 2 × 17.7 in (450 mm) torpedo tubes After refit: 5 × 4 in (102 mm) guns 1 × 40 mm (1.6 in) AA gun 2 × 17.7 in (450 mm) torpedo tubes

Insidioso (English: "Insidious") was an Italian Indomito-class destroyer. Commissioned into service in the Italian Regia Marina (Royal Navy) in 1914, she served in World War I, playing an active role in the Adriatic campaign and seeing action in the Battle of the Strait of Otranto in 1917. Reclassified as a torpedo boat in 1929, she was stricken in 1938. Reinstated in 1941, she was captured by Nazi German forces in 1943 during World War II. She then served in the German Kriegsmarine as TA21 until she was sunk in 1944.

== Construction and commissioning ==
Insidioso was laid down at the Cantiere Pattison (English: Pattison Shipyard) in Naples, Italy, in 1912. She was launched on 30 September 1913 and commissioned in 1914.

== Service history ==
=== World War I ===
==== 1915 ====
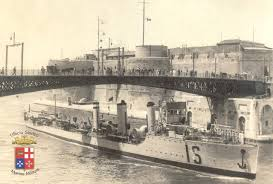
Insidioso passing under a bridge.

World War I broke out in 1914, and the Kingdom of Italy entered the war on the side of the Allies with its declaration of war on Austria-Hungary on 23 May 1915. At the time, Insidioso, under the command of Capitano di corvetta (Corvette Captain) U. Bucci, and the destroyers Impavido, Impetuoso, Indomito, Intrepido, and Irrequieto made up the 2nd Destroyer Squadron. The squadron, under the command of Capitano de fregata (Frigate Captain) P. Orsini, was based at Taranto, although either Impetuoso or Indomito or both were visiting La Spezia that day. On 9 June 1915, Insidioso, Indomito, Intrepido, Impetuoso, Irrequieto, the protected cruiser Quarto, and the destroyers Animoso, Ardente, Ardito, and Audace escorted the armored cruisers Giuseppe Garibaldi and Vettor Pisani as they participated in the bombardment of the lighthouses at the Cape of Rodon and Shëngjin (known to the Italians as San Giovanni di Medua) on the coast of the Principality of Albania.

On 3 December 1915 Insidioso, Impetuoso , Indomito, Intrepido, and Irrequieto got underway from Brindisi to escort one of the first supply convoys for Italian troops in Albania. As the convoy — composed of the troop transports Re Umberto and Valparaiso, carrying a total of 1,800 men and 150 draft animals — approached Shëngjin (known to the Italians as San Giovanni di Medua) on the coast of Albania, Re Umberto, with 765 men on board, hit a mine laid by the Imperial German Navy submarine UC-14, broke in two, and sank in 15 minutes. Rescuers saved 712 men.

On 8 December 1915, Insidioso and Impetuoso escorted the steamship Palermo, carrying over 700 men and 43 draft animals, from Taranto to Vlorë (known to the Italians as Valona) in Albania. On the night of 11–12 December 1915 Insidioso, now under the command of Capitano di corvetta (Corvette Captain) Bucci, and Impetuoso escorted Valparaiso, loaded with troops, from Taranto to Vlorë.

==== 1916 ====
On 23 February 1916 Insidioso and Impetuoso bombarded Austro-Hungarian artillery positions on the mountain Sasso Bianco in the Dolomites during the evacuation of Durrës (known to the Italians as Durazzo) in Albania. On 24 February Insidioso bombarded Austro-Hungarian positions at Rrashbull, Albania.

At 19:00 on 8 June 1916 Insidoso departed Vlorë with Impavido, the protected cruiser Libia, and the destroyers Espero and Pontiere to escort the armed merchant cruiser Principe Umberto and the troopship Romagna, which together had embarked the 2,605 men of the Italian Royal Army′s (Regio Esercito′s) 55th Infantry Regiment for transportation to Italy. The convoy had traveled only a short distance when the Austro-Hungarian submarine U-5 hit Principe Umberto in the stern with two torpedoes. Principe Umberto sank in a few minutes about 15 nautical miles (28 km; 17 mi) southwest of Cape Linguetta with the loss of 1,926 of the 2,821 men on board, the worst naval disaster of World War I in terms of lives lost. The escorting warships rescued the survivors but could not locate and counterattack U-5.

On 25 June 1916 Insidioso, Impavido, Irrequieto, Audace, and the protected cruiser Marsala operated in distant support of an attack by the motor torpedo boats MAS 5 and MAS 7 against Durrës. The attack resulted in serious damage to the 1,111-gross register ton steamship Sarajevo.

On 10 July 1916, Insidioso and Impetuoso were patrolling the Otranto Barrage in the Strait of Otranto when the Austro-Hungarian submarine U-17 attacked them. Hit by a torpedo, Impetuoso sank quickly with the loss of 37 of the 88 men aboard.

==== 1917–1918 ====
On the night of 14–15 May 1917, the Battle of the Strait of Otranto began when the Austro-Hungarian Navy staged a two-pronged attack against the Otranto Barrage in the Strait of Otranto aimed both at destroying naval drifters — armed fishing boats that patrolled the anti-submarine barrier the barrage formed — and, as a diversionary action, at destroying an Italian convoy bound from Greece to Albania. At 04:10 on 15 May, after receiving news of the attack, Insidioso, Impavido, Indomito, Marsala, the scout cruisers Aquila and Carlo Alberto Racchia, and the British Royal Navy light cruiser HMS Liverpool made ready for sea at Brindisi. At 05:30 the formation left Brindisi together with the British light cruiser HMS Dartmouth and two other destroyers, and at 07:45 the Allied force sighted the Austro-Hungarian destroyers Balaton and Csepel. Aquila and the Italian destroyers steered to attack the two Austro-Hungarian ships at 08:10 and opened fire on them at 08:15. In the ensuing exchange of gunfire, Balaton suffered damage and Aquila was hit and immobilized immediately afterwards. The two Austro-Hungarian destroyers ultimately took shelter under the cover of Austro-Hungarian coastal artillery batteries, forcing the Italian ships to give up the pursuit. Following a clash in which other Italian and Austro-Hungarian ships also participated, the battle ended with some ships damaged on both sides, but none sunk.

On 11 June 1917 Insidioso, Irrequieto, and the torpedo boats Airone and Ardea provided distant support to 10 Italian seaplanes sent to bomb Durrës. On 16 July 1917 Insidioso, Impavido, Indomito, Carlo Alberto Racchia, and the scout cruiser Augusto Riboty operated in distant support of an Italian air attack against Durrës carried out by 18 aircraft flying from Brindisi and Vlorë and supported by Ardea and the torpedo boat Pegaso.

An Austro-Hungarian Navy force consisting of the scout cruiser Helgoland and the destroyers Balaton, Csepel, Lika, Orjen, Tátra, and Triglav left Cattaro on 18 October 1917 to attack Italian convoys. The Austro-Hungarians found no convoys, so Helgoland and Lika moved within sight of Brindisi to entice Italian ships into chasing them and lure the Italians into an ambush by the Austro-Hungarian submarines U-32 and U-40. At 06:30 on 19 October 1917, Insidioso, the scout cruisers Alessandro Poerio and Guglielmo Pepe, and the destroyers Pilade Bronzetti and Simone Schiaffino got underway from Brindisi to pursue the Austro-Hungarians, and the destroyers Ippolito Nievo and Rosolino Pilo and the British light cruiser HMS Weymouth diverted from a voyage from Vlorë to Brindisi to join the pursuit. After a long chase which also saw some Italian air attacks on the Austro-Hungarian ships, the Austro-Hungarians escaped and all the Italian ships returned to port without damage.

By late October 1918, Austria-Hungary had effectively disintegrated, and the Armistice of Villa Giusti, signed on 3 November 1918, went into effect on 4 November 1918 and brought hostilities between Austria-Hungary and the Allies to an end. World War I ended a week later with the armistice between the Allies and the German Empire on 11 November 1918.

=== Interwar period ===
After the end of World War I, Insidioso′s armament was revised, giving her five 102 mm (4 in)/35-caliber guns, a single 40 mm (1.6 in)/35-caliber gun, and four 450-millimetre (17.7 in) torpedo tubes. She was reclassified as a torpedo boat in 1929 and stricken from the naval register in 1938.

=== World War II ===
==== Italian service ====
World War II broke out in September 1939 with Nazi Germany's invasion of Poland. Italy joined the war on the side of the Axis powers with its invasion of France in June 1940. In 1941, Insidioso was reinstated and resumed service. The oldest Italian torpedo boat in service, she had only limited military usefulness.

After the British submarine HMS Thorn sank the Italian submarine Medusa on 30 January 1942, Insidioso took part in unsuccessful efforts at the end of January to rescue Medusa crewmen trapped within the submarine′s submerged wreck.

==== German service ====
Italy announced an armistice with the Allies on 8 September 1943 and switched sides in the war, prompting Germany to forcibly occupy Italy and seize Italian military assets. On 10 September 1943, the Germans captured Insidioso at Pola. Renamed TA21, the ship entered service in the German Kriegsmarine on 8 November 1943.

British aircraft attacked and seriously damaged TA21 off Istria on 9 August 1944. An American torpedo bomber sank her in port at Fiume on 5 November 1944. Her wreck was refloated and scrapped in 1947.
