= Italian destroyer Ippolito Nievo =

Italian Rosolino Pilo-class destroyer

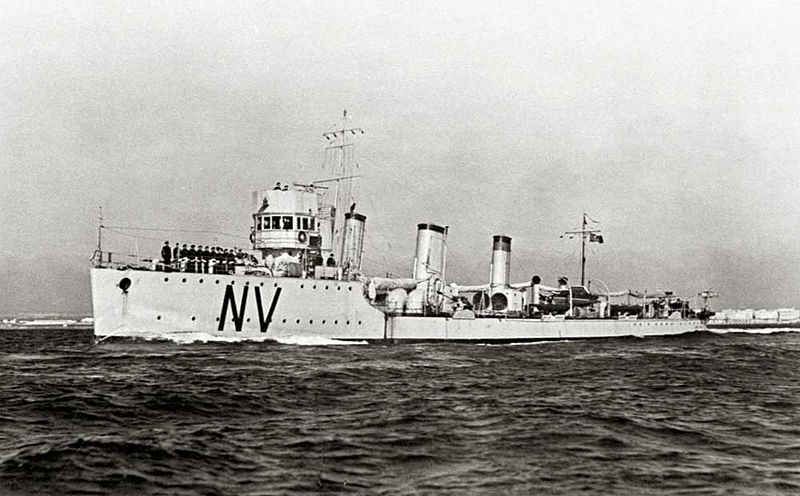

History

Kingdom of Italy
- Name: Ippolito Nievo
- Namesake: Ippolito Nievo (1832–1860), Italian patriot
- Builder: Cantieri navali Odero, Sestri Ponente, Kingdom of Italy
- Laid down: 19 August 1913
- Launched: 24 July 1915
- Commissioned: 1 October 1915
- Identification: Pennant number NV
- Reclassified: Torpedo boat 1 October 1929
- Stricken: 24 April 1938
- Fate: Scrapped

General characteristics
- Class & type: Rosolino Pilo-class destroyer
- Displacement: 912 tons (max); 770 tons (standard)
- Length: 73 m (240 ft)
- Beam: 7.3 m (24 ft)
- Draught: 2.3 m (7 ft 7 in)
- Installed power: 16,000 brake horsepower (11,931 kW)
- Propulsion: 1 × Tosi steam turbines; 4 × Thornycroft boilers
- Speed: 30 knots (56 km/h; 35 mph)
- Range: 1,200 nmi (2,200 km; 1,400 mi) at 14 knots (26 km/h; 16 mph)
- Complement: 69–79
- Armament: As built: 4 × 1 Cannon 76/40 Model 1916; 2 × 1 76mm/30 AA; 4 × 1 450 mm (17.7 in) torpedo tubes; 10 mines; Post-World War I: 5 × 1 102 mm (4.0 in)/35 guns; 2 × 1 – 40 mm/39 AA; 2 × 1 65-millimetre (2.6 in) machine guns; 4 × 1 450 mm (17.7 in) torpedo tubes

Ippolito Nievo was an Italian Rosolino Pilo-class destroyer. Commissioned into service in the Italian Regia Marina ("Royal Navy") in 1915, she served in World War I, participating in the Adriatic campaign, during which she took part in motor torpedo boat raids and operated on convoy escort duty. Reclassified as a torpedo boat in 1929, she was stricken in 1938.

== Construction and commissioning ==
Ippolito Nievo was laid down at the Cantieri navali Odero (English: Odero Shipyard) in Sestri Ponente, Italy, on 19 August 1913. She was launched on 24 July 1915 and completed and commissioned on 1 October 1915.

== Service history ==
=== World War I ===
==== 1915 ====
World War I was raging when Ippolito Nievo entered service in October 1915. On the afternoon of 6 December 1915, she was under the command of Prince Ferdinando, Duke of Genoa — a future admiral — when she and the protected cruiser Quarto, the scout cruiser Guglielmo Pepe, the auxiliary cruiser Città di Catania, the minelayers Minerva and Partenope, and the destroyers Borea, Francesco Nullo, and Giuseppe Cesare Abba departed Taranto, Italy, to escort a convoy to Vlorë (known to the Italians as Valona) in the Principality of Albania. The convoy — made up of the troopships America, Cordova, Dante Alighieri, and Indiana — carried 400 officers, 6,300 non-commissioned officers and soldiers, and 1,200 draft animals. The convoy reached Vlorë at 08:00 on 7 December 1915.

At approximately 09:00 on 29 December 1915 Ippolito Nievo, Giuseppe Cesare Abba, and other destroyers departed Brindisi, Italy, with the protected cruiser Nino Bixio and the British Royal Navy light cruiser HMS Weymouth to join other formations of Allied warships in pursuing an Austro-Hungarian Navy force composed of the scout cruiser Helgoland and the destroyers Balaton, Csepel, Lika, Tátra, and Triglav, which had bombarded the harbor at Durrës (known to the Italians as Durazzo) on the coast of Albania, sinking the Greek steamer Mikael and two sailing ships while losing Lika, which struck a mine. Ippolito Nievo did not play a significant role in the subsequent clash, known as the First Battle of Durazzo, in which Helgoland and British and French cruisers suffered minor damage and French destroyers sank Triglav.

==== 1916 ====
On the night of 25–26 June 1916, while the protected cruiser Marsala and the destroyers Audace, Impavido, Insidioso, and Irrequieto operated in distant support, Ippolito Nievo, Giuseppe Cesare Abba, and the destroyers Antonio Mosto, Pilade Bronzetti, and Rosolino Pilo escorted the coastal torpedo boats 34 PN and 36 PN as 34 PN and 36 PN towed the motor torpedo boats MAS 5 and MAS 7 to a point 2.5 nautical miles (4.6 km; 2.9 mi) off Durrës. MAS 5 and MAS 7 then dropped their tow cables at 00:15 on 26 June and raided the harbor at Durrës, launching torpedoes at 01:45 and rejoining Ippolito Nievo′s formation at 02:40. The attack resulted in serious damage to the 1,111-gross register ton steamship Sarajevo, and all the Italian ships returned to base safely. During the night of 3–4 November 1916 Ippolito Nievo, Giuseppe Cesare Abba, and Rosolino Pilo escorted 34 PN and the coastal torpedo boats 35 PN and 37 PN as they towed the motor torpedo boats MAS 6 and MAS 7 for another attack on Durrës, which failed because of the presence of torpedo nets in the harbor.

At 23:00 on 22 December 1916 Ippolito Nievo, Giuseppe Cesare Abba, and Rosolino Pilo got underway from Brindisi and headed for Cape Rodoni to intercept the Austro-Hungarian destroyers Dinara, Reka, Scharfschutze, and Velebit, which had attacked the Otranto Barrage in the Strait of Otranto and were returning to the naval base at Cattaro on the coast of Austria-Hungary after a clash with the French Navy destroyers Boutefeu, Casque, Commandant Bory, Commandant Rivière, Dehorter, and Protet. The Italian destroyers did not find the Austro-Hungarian ships, but did encounter the French destroyers. The two groups of Allied ships were unable to coordinate their maneuvers and confusion ensued. At 01:40 on 23 December Giuseppe Cesare Abba sighted smoke on her port bow and turned north to investigate, accelerating to full speed. After recognizing Dehorter and Protet, she sighted Casque approachng her, but too late to avoid a collision, although neither Giuseppe Cesare Abba or Casque suffered serious damage. Giuseppe Cesare Abba backed away from Casque after the collision and was maneuvering in reverse when Boutefeu, which had narrowly avoided collisions with Ippolito Nievo and Rosolino Pilo, rammed Giuseppe Cesare Abba, killing a man who went missing. Again the damage was not serious, and all three damaged destroyers returned to port.

On 24 December 1916 Ippolito Nievo, Impavido, and the scout cruiser Carlo Mirabello supported an operation by the motor torpedo boats MAS 3 and MAS 6, which, towed respectively by the coastal torpedo boats 36 PN and 54 AS, were supposed to attack Austro-Hungarian ships in port at Durrës. The Italians aborted the attack when MAS 6 suffered damage in a collision with wreckage 3 nautical miles (5.6 km; 3.5 mi) from Durrës.

==== 1917 ====
On 11 June 1917 Ippolito Nievo, Rosolino Pilo, and 37 PN departed Brindisi and provided support to an attack against Durrës by nine seaplanes. On the night of 3–4 September 1917 Ippolito Nievo, Antonio Mosto, Nino Bixio, the British light cruiser HMS Weymouth, and the French destroyers Bisson and Commandant Bory departed Otranto, Italy, to escort six Italian torpedo boats and eight British speedboats that were supposed to carry out a raid against Cattaro. The Allied force had to abort and postpone the attack due to worsening weather conditions.

An Austro-Hungarian Navy force consisting of Helgoland and the destroyers Balaton, Csepel, Lika, Orjen, Tátra, and Triglav left Cattaro on 18 October 1917 to attack Italian convoys. The Austro-Hungarians found no convoys, so Helgoland and Lika moved within sight of Brindisi to entice Allied ships into chasing them and lure the Allies into an ambush by the Austro-Hungarian submarines U-32 and U-40. At 06:30 on 19 October 1917, the destroyer Insidioso, the scout cruisers Alessandro Poerio and Guglielmo Pepe, and the destroyers Pilade Bronzetti and Simone Schiaffino got underway from Brindisi to pursue the Austro-Hungarians, and Ippolito Nievo, Rosolino Pilo, and HMS Weymouth diverted from a voyage from Vlorë to Brindisi to join the pursuit. After a long chase which also saw some Italian air attacks on the Austro-Hungarian ships, the Austro-Hungarians escaped and all the Italian ships returned to port without damage.

==== 1918 ====
Ippolito Nievo, the scout cruisers Cesare Rossarol and Guglielmo Pepe and the destroyer Indomito were assigned to support a raid against Durrës on the night of 10–11 February 1918 by the motor torpedo boats MAS 9 and MAS 20, towed by the coastal torpedo boats 37 PN and 38 PN. Bad weather forced the cancellation of the raid.

On 10 March 1918, Ippolito Nievo, with the motor torpedo boat MAS 99 in tow, and Antonio Mosto, towing MAS 100, set out for a raid on Portorož (known to the Italians as Portorose) on the coast of Austria-Hungary, with Pilade Bronzetti, the scout cruisers Alessandro Poerio, Augusto Riboty, Carlo Mirabello, and Cesare Rossarol, the destroyer Giacinto Carini, and a French Navy destroyer squadron led by the destroyer Casque in support. Ippolito Nievo, Antonio Mosto, MAS 99, and MAS 100 reached the vicinity of Portorož, but then had to postpone the operation due to bad weather. The ships attempted the raid again on 16 March, but adverse weather again forced its postponement. They made a third attempt on 8 April 1918, but after aerial reconnaissance ascertained that the port of Portorož was empty, the Italians again called off the operation.

At 18:10 on 12 May 1918, Ippolito Nievo, with MAS 100 in tow, and Pilade Bronzetti, towing MAS 99, got underway from Brindisi for a raid against the roadstead at Durrës. At 23:00, MAS 99 and MAS 100 dropped their tow cables about 10 nautical miles (19 km; 12 mi) from Durrës, then entered the harbor. At 02:30 on 13 May MAS 99 torpedoed the steamer Bregenz, which sank a few minutes later with the loss of 234 men. The attack triggered a violent Austro-Hungarian reaction, but all the ships returned to Brindisi unscathed.

At 23:54 on 14 May 1918, Ippolito Nievo, with MAS 99 in tow, and Pilade Bronzetti, towing MAS 100, dropped their tow cables about 15 nautical miles (28 km; 17 mi) from Bar (known to the Italians as Antivari) on the coast of Montenegro. The two MAS boats, after an unsuccessful attack on Bar, reunited with the two destroyers. The scout cruisers Cesare Rossarol and Guglielmo Pepe supported the operation, which concluded with the return of the ships to Brindisi at 09:00 on 15 May.

On 2 October 1918 Ippolito Nievo was at sea with the battleship Dante Alighieri, the scout cruisers Alessandro Poerio, Carlo Alberto Racchia, Cesare Rossarol, and Gulglielmo Pepe and the destroyer Simone Schiaffino to provide distant cover for a British and Italian naval bombardment of Durrës. Ippolito Nievo′s force's main mission was to counter any counterattack against the bombardment force by Austro-Hungarian ships based at Cattaro.

By late October 1918, Austria-Hungary had effectively disintegrated, and the Armistice of Villa Giusti, signed on 3 November 1918, went into effect on 4 November 1918 and brought hostilities between Austria-Hungary and the Allies to an end. World War I ended a week later with the armistice between the Allies and the German Empire on 11 November 1918.

=== Post-World War I ===
After World War I, Ippolito Nievo underwent the revision of her armament, which became five 102-millimetre (4 in)/35-caliber guns, two 40-millimetre (1.6 in)/35-caliber guns, and four 450-millimetre (17.7 in) torpedo tubes, and, according to some sources, two 65-millimetre (2.6 in) machine guns. Her full-load displacement rose to 900 tonnes (886 long tons). She was reclassified as a torpedo boat on 1 October 1929.

From 1933 to 1936, Ippolito Nievo was assigned to the naval command school, serving as the flagship of torpedo boat squadrons, initially of the 1st Torpedo Boat Squadron and then of the 3rd Torpedo Boat Squadron. Her commanding officers during this period included the Capitani di fregata (Frigate Captains) Franco Garofalo and Gino Pavesi, both future admirals. She was stricken on 24 April 1938, and subsequently scrapped, the only Rosolino Pilo-class ship that did not serve in World War II.
