= Battle of the Strait of Otranto (1917) =

Battle in World War I

Coordinates: 40°13′10″N 18°55′32″E

- Part of the Mediterranean Theater of World War I
- SMS Novara in action
| Date | 15 May 1917 |
| Location | Strait of Otranto, Adriatic Sea |
| Result | Tactical Austro-Hungarian victory; Strategically indecisive |

Belligerents
| Austria–Hungary; Germany | Italy; United Kingdom; France |

Commanders and leaders
| (Austria-Hungary) Miklós Horthy (WIA) | (Kingdom of Italy) Alfredo Acton |

Strength
| 1 armoured cruiser 3 scout cruisers 4 destroyers 3 submarines | 2 light cruisers 1 protected cruiser 3 scout cruisers 10 destroyers 1 seaplane carrier 47 drifters |

Casualties and losses
| 2 scout cruisers damaged | 1 light cruiser damaged 2 destroyers sunk 1 destroyer damaged 14 drifters sunk 4 drifters damaged 1 cargo ship sunk 1 cargo ship damaged |

The Battle of the Strait of Otranto of 1917 was the result of an Austro-Hungarian raid during the Adriatic Campaign of World War I on the Otranto Barrage, an Allied naval blockade of the Strait of Otranto. The battle took place on 15 May 1917, and was the largest surface action in the Adriatic Sea during World War I. The Otranto Barrage was a fixed barrier, composed of lightly armed naval drifters (modified fishing boats) with anti-submarine nets coupled with minefields and supported by Allied naval patrols.

The Austro-Hungarian Navy planned to raid the Otranto Barrage with a force of three light cruisers and two destroyers under the command of Commander (later Admiral) Miklós Horthy in an attempt to break the barrier to allow Austro-Hungarian and Imperial German Navy U-boats freer access to the Mediterranean Sea and Allied shipping. An Allied force composed of ships from three navies responded to the raid, and in the ensuing battle heavily damaged the Austro-Hungarian light cruiser Novara. However, the rapid approach of the Austro-Hungarian relief force persuaded the Italian Rear Admiral Alfredo Acton, the Allied commander, to retreat.

== Disposition of forces ==
Under the command of Horthy, three Austro-Hungarian light cruisers (Novara, Saida, and Helgoland, modified to resemble large British destroyers) were ordered to attack the drifters on the night of 14 May and attempt to destroy as many as possible before daybreak. The destroyers Csepel and Balaton were to mount a diversionary raid off the Albanian coast in order to confuse any Allied counter-attack. Two Austro-Hungarian U-boats—U-4 and U-27, along with the German U-boat UC-25—were to participate in the operation as well. A supporting force composed of the armored cruiser Sankt Georg, two destroyers, and four 250t-class torpedo boats was on standby if the raiders ran into trouble. The old pre-dreadnought battleship Budapest and three more 250t-class torpedo boats were also available if necessary.

An Allied destroyer patrol was in the area on the night of 14 May, to the north of the Barrage. The Italian flotilla leader Carlo Mirabello was accompanied by the French Navy destroyers Commandant Rivière, Bisson and Cimeterre. The Italian destroyer Borea was also in the area, escorting a small Italian convoy consisting of the steamers Bersagliere, Carroccio, and Verità which had departed Gallipoli on 14 May 1917 bound for Vlorë (known to the Italians as Valona) in Albania. A support force was based in the port of Brindisi, consisting of the British Royal Navy light cruisers HMS Dartmouth and HMS Bristol and several French and Italian destroyers.

== Convoy action ==
At around 03:30 Italian time on 15 May, shortly after the Italian convoy turned to a heading of 310 degrees to proceed toward Vlorë, Borea sighted Csepel and Balaton, which in turn had sighted the Italian convoy at 03:06 Austro-Hungarian time (which differed from Italian time) and were steering to attack it. Uncertain of their identity, Borea closed the range to around 1,000 metres (1,100 yd) and made recognition signals. In response, Csepel opened gunfire at 03:24 Austro-Hungarian time. Borea maneuvered to make a torpedo attack against Csepel, but Csepel scored a hit that burst one of Borea′s steam pipes, immobilizing her. Csepel then hit Borea with two shells which struck near her waterline, and Borea began to list. Borea then took a shell hit on her bow. In the meantime, Balaton attacked the three merchant ships of the convoy. Carroccio, which was carrying munitions, and Verità caught fire and their crews abandoned ship; Carroccio sank later, but Verità remained afloat and eventually reached port. Bersagliere suffered only slight damage and escaped. The clash ended at 03:45 when the two Austro-Hungarian ships withdrew. Borea′s crew abandoned ship, and she sank at 05:20 on 15 May 1917. Her crew suffered 11 men killed and 12 wounded.

== Raid on the drifters ==
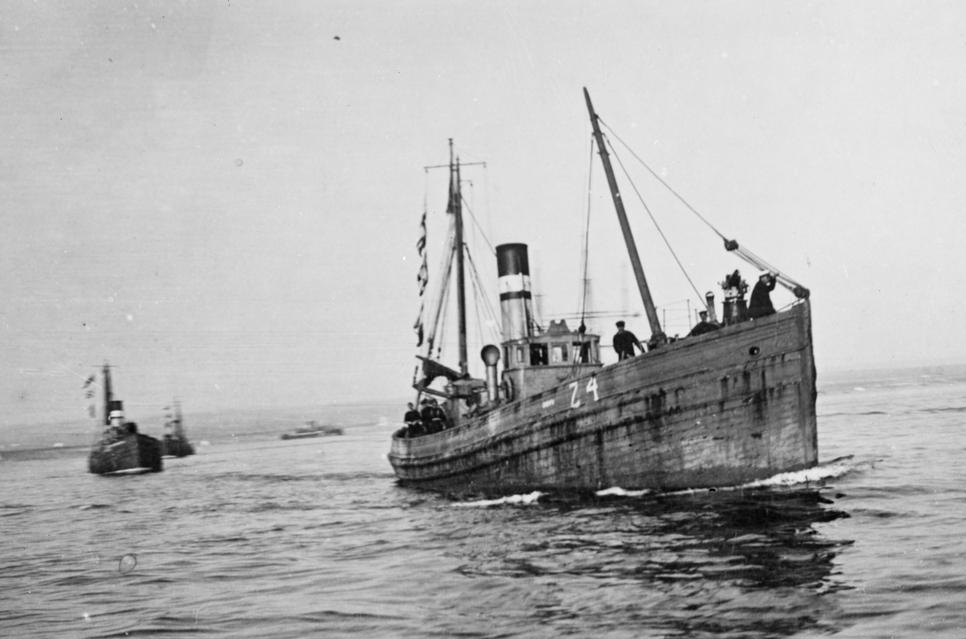
British drifters steaming from their base in the Adriatic Sea to the Otranto Barrage.

The three Austro-Hungarian cruisers were able to pass through the line of drifters, and at 03:30 began attacking the small barrage ships. The Austro-Hungarians frequently gave the drifter crews warning to abandon ship before opening fire. In some instances, the drifter crews chose to fight: Gowan Lee returned the Austro-Hungarian ships' fire. Gowan Lee was heavily damaged, but remained afloat; her captain—Joseph Watt—was later awarded the Victoria Cross for his actions during the battle.

There were 47 drifters in the Barrage on the night of 14–15 May; the Austro-Hungarians managed to sink 14 drifters and damage four more. The lack of sufficient Allied escorts forced the withdrawal of the remaining blockading ships, although only for a short time.

== Battle ==
By this time, the Allied naval forces in the area were aware of the raid, and were in a position to block the Austro-Hungarian retreat. Rear Admiral Alfredo Acton—the commanding officer of the Italian Scouting Division—ordered Carlo Mirabello's group southward at 04:35, while he embarked on Dartmouth. By 06:45, Dartmouth, Bristol the Italian destroyers Rosolino Pilo, Antonio Mosto, Simone Schiaffino, and Giovanni Acerbi, and the Italian scout cruiser Aquila—were steaming north in an attempt to cut off the Austro-Hungarian cruisers. The Italian protected cruiser Marsala, flotilla leader Carlo Alberto Racchia, and destroyers Insidioso, Indomito, and Impavido were readying to get underway in support as well.

The Carlo Mirabello group engaged the Austro-Hungarian cruisers at 07:00, Carlo Mirabello hit the cruiser Novara two times but the Allied squadron was heavily outgunned and instead attempted to shadow the fleeing cruisers. At 07:45, Rear Admiral Acton's ships encountered the destroyers Csepel and Balaton. After 20 minutes, the Italian destroyers were able to close the distance to the Austro-Hungarian ships; the two groups engaged in a short artillery duel before a shot from Csepel struck Aquila and disabled the ship's boilers. By this time, the Austro-Hungarian destroyers were under the cover of the coastal batteries at Durrës (known to the Italians as Durazzo), and were able to make good their escape.

At 09:00, Bristol's lookouts spotted the smoke from the Austro-Hungarian cruisers to the south of her position. The Allied ships turned to engage the Austro-Hungarian ships; the British ships had a superiority both in numbers and in firepower; Dartmouth was armed with eight 6 in (152 mm) guns and Bristol had two 6 inch and ten 4 in (102 mm), compared to the nine 3.9 in (99 mm) guns on each of the Austro-Hungarian ships. Unfortunately for the Allies, their numerical superiority was quickly lost, as their destroyers were either occupied with mechanical problems, or protecting those destroyers suffering from breakdowns. Carlo Mirabello hit Helgoland at 10.04, and at 10.15 Mirabello slowed down due to an engine problem. The support forces of both sides—the Sankt Georg group for the Austro-Hungarians, and the Marsala group for the Allies—were quickly dispatched to join the battle. Italian FBA seaplanes from the seaplane carrier Europa shadowed the Austro-Hungarian cruisers and eventually dropped bombs on Helgoland, only scoring a near-miss that dislodged some rivets in her rudder.

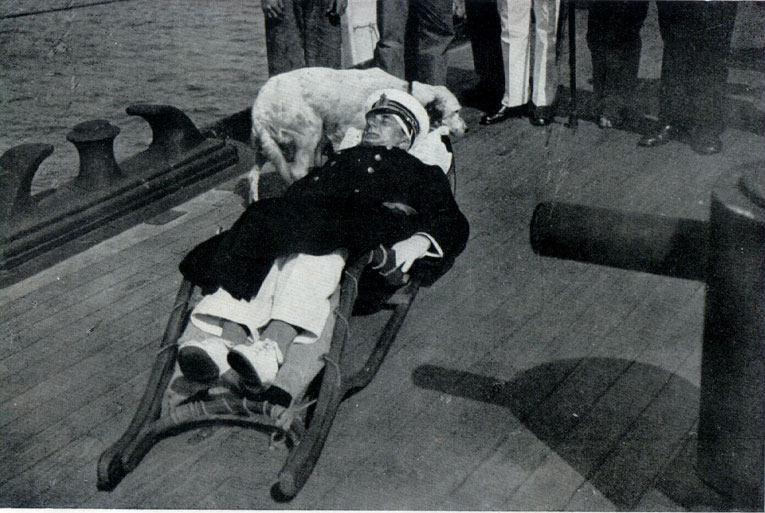
Horthy, seriously wounded in the last minutes of the battle, commanded the Austro-Hungarian fleet until falling unconscious.

Dartmouth—faster than Bristol—closed to effective engagement range with the Austro-Hungarian ships, and opened fire. A shell from Dartmouth struck Novara, at which point the Austro-Hungarian ships laid a smoke screen in order to close the distance. Dartmouth was struck several times, and by 11:00, Acton ordered the ship to reduce speed to allow Bristol to catch up. Novara was hit several more times, and her main feed pumps and starboard auxiliary steam pipe had been damaged, which caused the ship to begin losing speed. At 11:05, Acton turned away in an attempt to separate Saida from Novara and Helgoland. At this point, Sankt Georg was approaching the scene, which prompted Acton to temporarily withdraw to consolidate his forces. This break in the action was enough time for the Austro-Hungarians to save the crippled Novara; Saida took the ship under tow while Helgoland covered them.

Unaware that Novara had been disabled, and fearing that his ships would be drawn too close to the Austro-Hungarian naval base at Cattaro, Acton broke off the pursuit. The destroyer Giovanni Acerbi misread the signal and attempted a torpedo attack, but was driven off by the combined fire of Novara, Saida, and Helgoland. At 12:05, Acton realized the dire situation Novara was in, but by this time, the Sankt Georg group was too close. The Sankt Georg group rendezvoused with Novara, Saida, and Helgoland, and Csepel and Balaton reached the scene as well. The entire group returned to Cattaro together.

At 13:30, the submarine UC-25 torpedoed Dartmouth, causing serious damage. The escorting destroyers drove off UC-25, but Dartmouth had to be abandoned for a period of time before she could be towed back to port. The French destroyer Boutefeu attempted to pursue the German submarine, but struck a mine laid by UC-25 that morning and sank rapidly.

== Aftermath ==
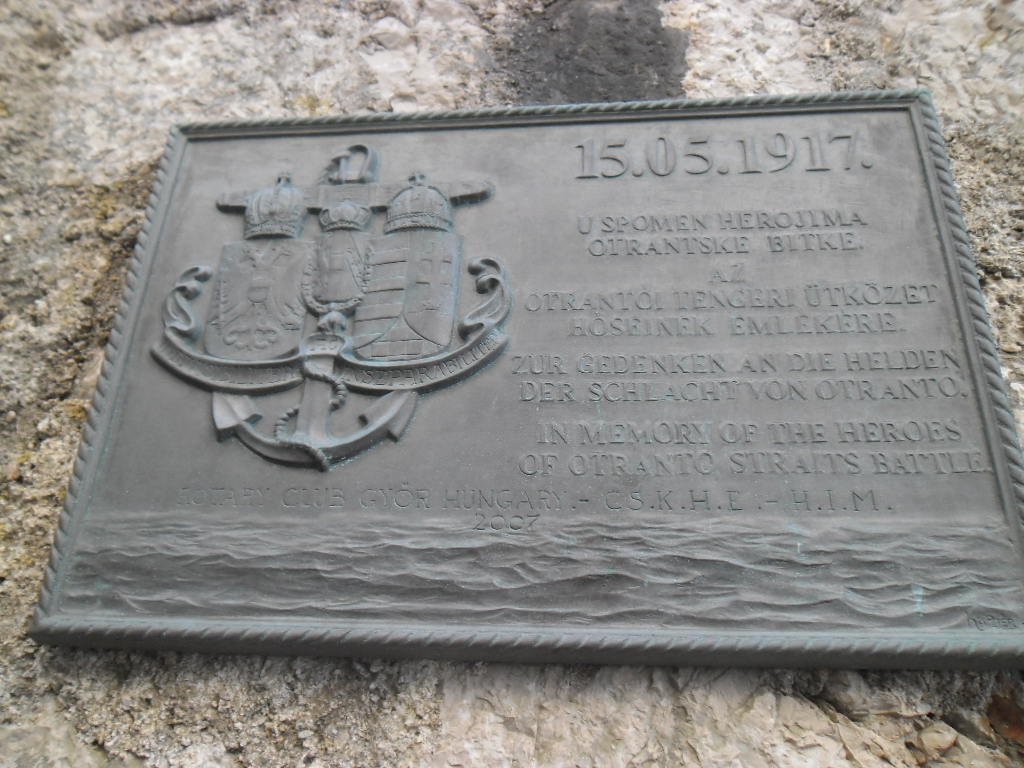
Monument for the "heroes of the Battle of Otranto" in Prevlaka, now in Croatia.

Tactically, the Austro-Hungarians claimed victory, having inflicted significant losses on the drifter line without losing any of their raiders. As a result of the raid, the British naval command decided that unless sufficient destroyers were available to protect the barrage, the drifters would have to be withdrawn at night. After the raid, the drifters operated for less than twelve hours a day and had to leave their positions by 15:00 every day. Despite the damage received by the Austro-Hungarian cruisers during the pursuit by Dartmouth and Bristol, the Austro-Hungarian forces inflicted more serious casualties on the Allied blockade. In addition to the sunk and damaged drifters, the cruiser Dartmouth was nearly sunk by the German submarine UC-25, the French destroyer Boutefeu was mined and sunk, the Italian destroyer Borea was sunk, and a munitions convoy to Valona was interdicted.

However, in a strategic sense, the battle had little effect on the war. The barrage was never particularly effective at preventing the U-boat operations of the German Empire and Austria-Hungary in the first place. The drifters could cover approximately 0.5 nautical miles (0.9 km; 0.6 mi) apiece of the Strait of Otranto, which is 40 nautical miles (74 km; 46 mi) wide, and the barrage covered only slightly more than half of the strait. The raid had risked some of the most modern ships of the Austro-Hungarian fleet on an operation that offered minimal strategic returns.
