= Italian destroyer Irrequieto =

Italian destroyer of World War I

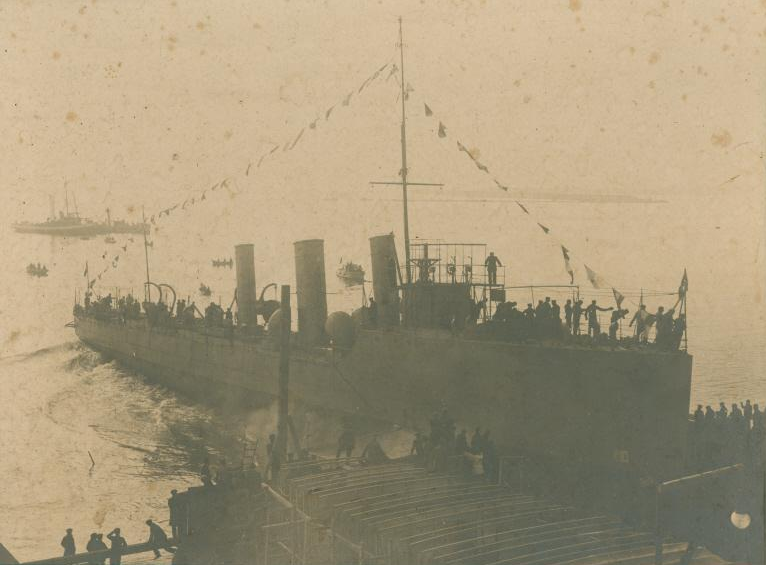
- The launch of Irrequieto at Naples, Italy, on 12 December 1912.

History

Kingdom of Italy
- Name: Irrequieto
- Namesake: "Restless"
- Builder: Cantiere Pattison, Naples, Kingdom of Italy
- Laid down: 1910
- Launched: 12 December 1912
- Sponsored by: Mrs. Blanche Wenner
- Commissioned: 1913
- Reclassified: Torpedo boat 1929
- Stricken: 11 October 1937
- Identification: Pennant number IR
- Motto: Fortibus nulla quies ("There is no rest for the strong")
- Fate: Discarded and scrapped

General characteristics
- Type: Destroyer
- Displacement: 672–770 metric tons (741–849 short tons)
- Length: 237 ft 11 in (72.52 m) (wl); 239 ft 6 in (73.00 m) (oa)
- Beam: 24 ft (7.3 m)
- Draft: 7 ft 11 in (2.41 m)
- Propulsion: 2 shafts; 2 × Tosi steam turbines; 4 × Thornycroft boilers; 16,000 hp (11,931 kW) designed/17,620 shp (13,139 kW) maximum
- Speed: 30 knots (56 km/h; 35 mph) designed; 35.79 knots (66.28 km/h; 41.19 mph) maximum
- Endurance: 1,200 nmi (2,200 km; 1,400 mi) at 14 knots (26 km/h; 16 mph); 500 nmi (930 km; 580 mi) at 25 knots (46 km/h; 29 mph); 350 nmi (650 km; 400 mi) at 30 knots (56 km/h; 35 mph)
- Complement: 4–5 officers, 65–74 enlisted men
- Armament: As built: 1 × 4.7 in (120 mm) gun 4 × 3 in (76.2 mm) guns 2 × 17.7 in (450 mm) torpedo tubes After refit: 5 × 4 in (102 mm) guns 1 × 40 mm (1.6 in) AA gun 2 × 17.7 in (450 mm) torpedo tubes

Irrequieto (English: "Restless") was an Italian Indomito-class destroyer. Commissioned into service in the Italian Regia Marina (Royal Navy) in 1913, she served in World War I, playing an active role in the Adriatic campaign. Reclassified as a torpedo boat in 1929, she was stricken in 1937.

== Construction and commissioning ==
Irrequieto was laid down at the Cantiere Pattison (English: Pattison Shipyard) in Naples, Italy, in 1910. She was launched on 12 December 1912, sponsored by Mrs. Blanche Wenner, and commissioned in 1913.

== Service history ==
=== World War I ===
==== 1915 ====
World War I broke out in 1914, and the Kingdom of Italy entered the war on the side of the Allies with its declaration of war on Austria-Hungary on 23 May 1915. At the time, Irrequieto, under the command of Capitano di corvetta (Corvette Captain) Moreno, and the destroyers Indomito, Impavido, Impetuoso, Insidioso, and Intrepido made up the 2nd Destroyer Squadron. The squadron, under the command of Capitano de fregata (Frigate Captain) P. Orsini, was based at Taranto, although either Impetuoso or Indomito or both were visiting La Spezia that day.

On 9 June 1915, Irrequieto, Impetuoso, Indomito, Insidioso, Intrepido, the protected cruiser Quarto, and the destroyers Animoso, Ardente, Ardito, and Audace escorted the armored cruisers Giuseppe Garibaldi and Vettor Pisani as they bombarded the lighthouses at the Cape of Rodon and Shëngjin (known to the Italians as San Giovanni di Medua) on the coast of the Principality of Albania.

In the early hours of 17 July 1915 Intrepido, Animoso, Irrequieto, and Quarto bombarded the radiotelegraph station and other Austro-Hungarian military installations on Šipan (known to the Italians as Giuppana), an island off the coast of Dalmatia. This bombardment, as well as another carried out by the 5th Naval Division, was interrupted when Vettor Pisani of the 5th Naval Division sighted an Austro-Hungarian submarine at 04:25. After the Italian ships began their return voyage, the Austro-Hungarian submarine U-4 attacked at 04:40 and torpedoed Giuseppe Garibaldi, which sank within minutes. Rescue efforts saved 525 men out of the 578 on board Giuseppe Garibaldi.

On 3 December 1915 Irrequieto, Impetuoso , Indomito, Insidioso, and Intrepido got underway from Brindisi to escort one of the first supply convoys for Italian troops in Albania. As the convoy — composed of the troop transports Re Umberto and Valparaiso, carrying a total of 1,800 men and 150 draft animals — approached Shëngjin (known to the Italians as San Giovanni di Medua) on the coast of Albania, Re Umberto, with 765 men on board, hit a mine laid by the Imperial German Navy submarine UC-14, broke in two, and sank in 15 minutes. Rescuers saved 712 men.

==== 1916–1918 ====
On 24 February 1916, Irrequieto, Impetuoso, Indomito, Ardito, the protected cruisers Libia and Puglia, the auxiliary cruisers Città di Catania and Città di Siracusa, and the destroyer Bersagliere began to bombard advancing Austro-Hungarian troops in Albania who were about to occupy Durrës (known to the Italians as Durazzo). In the following days they also bombarded Austro-Hungarian artillery positions on the mountain Sasso Bianco in the Dolomites near Durrës.

On 25 June 1916 Irrequieto, Impavido, Insidioso, Audace, and the protected cruiser Marsala provided distant support for an attack by the motor torpedo boats MAS 5 and MAS 7 against Durrës. The attack seriously damaged the 1,111-gross register ton steamship Sarajevo.

On 9 July 1916 Irrequieto (now under the command of an officer named Ponza di San Martino) and Impetuoso pursued the Austro-Hungarian scout cruiser Novara, which had attacked the Otranto Barrage in the Strait of Otranto and sunk the naval drifters — armed fishing boats patrolling anti-submarine barriers — Astrum, Claivis, and Spei. However, Novara reached the Austro-Hungarian naval base at Cattaro before they could intercept her.

On 11 June 1917 Irrequieto, Insidioso, and the torpedo boats Airone and Ardea provided distant support to 10 Italian seaplanes sent to bomb Durrës.

By late October 1918, Austria-Hungary had effectively disintegrated, and the Armistice of Villa Giusti, signed on 3 November 1918, went into effect on 4 November 1918, ending hostilities between Austria-Hungary and the Allies. World War I ended a week later with the armistice between the Allies and the German Empire on 11 November 1918.

=== Post-World War I ===
After World War I, Irrequieto′s armament was revised to five 102 mm (4 in)/35-caliber guns, a single 40 mm (1.6 in)/35-caliber gun, and four 450-millimetre (17.7 in) torpedo tubes. She was reclassified as a torpedo boat in 1929. She was stricken from the naval register on 11 October 1937 and subsequently discarded and scrapped.
