= French destroyer Casque =

At least two ships of the French Navy have been named Casque:

- French destroyer Casque (1910), a Bouclier-class destroyer launched in 1910 and scrapped in 1927
- French destroyer Casque (1938), a Le Hardi-class destroyer launched in 1938 and scuttled in 1942
