= SS Re Umberto =

Italian passenger ship (1892–1915)

History

Kingdom of Italy
- Name: (Kingdom of Italy) Re Umberto
- Namesake: Umberto I of Italy
- Owner: Semidei & Ferrari
- Port of registry: Kingdom of Italy, Genoa
- Builder: Ansaldo G. & Co. - Societa Nazionale di Navigazione Ansaldo
- Yard number: 48
- Completed: 1892
- Acquired: 1892
- Maiden voyage: 1892
- In service: 1892
- Out of service: 4 December 1915
- Identification: Official number: 222
- Fate: Struck a mine and sunk on 4 December 1915

General characteristics
- Type: Passenger ship
- Tonnage: 3,164 GRT
- Length: 101 m (331 ft 4 in)
- Beam: 12.3 m (40 ft 4 in)
- Depth: 5.6 m (18 ft 4 in)
- Installed power: One triple expansion steam engine
- Propulsion: 1 screw propeller
- Speed: 12 knots (22 km/h; 14 mph)
- Notes: 2 masts and 1 funnel

SS Re Umberto was an Italian passenger ship that struck a mine laid by the German submarine SM UC-14 and sunk in the Adriatic Sea off Cape Linguetta, Albania on 4 December 1915 with the loss of 94 lives, while she was travelling from Taranto, Italy to Valona, Albania.

== Construction ==
Re Umberto was laid down at the Ansaldo G. & Co. shipyard in Genoa, Italy in 1892 and was completed that same year. The ship was 101 metres (331 ft 4 in) long, had a beam of 12.3 metres (40 ft 4 in) and a depth of 5.6 metres (18 ft 4 in). She was assessed at 3,164 gross register tons (GRT) and had one triple expansion steam engine producing 250 nhp, driving a single screw propeller. The ship could reach a maximum speed of 12 knots (22 km/h; 14 mph) and possessed two masts and a single funnel.

== Career and loss ==
Re Umberto entered service in 1892 and was used as a passenger ship under various owners until she was chartered as a troopship following the Italian entry into World War I. Re Umberto left Taranto, Italy for Valona, Albania on 3 December 1915 in a convoy, consisting of fellow troopship Valparaiso and four destroyers which carried a total of 1,800 troops and 150 draft animals of which 765 men were aboard Re Umberto. As the convoy entered the Bay of Valona at 10.15 pm, a loud explosion rocked the Re Umberto as she struck a floating mine amidships on her port side. All men aboard Re Umberto got on deck and proceeded to board the nine lifeboats, which had already been swung out when the ship left Italy. All lifeboats safely got away, yet many troops were left stranded on the sinking ship. The remaining men on Re Umberto were rescued by the drifters Evening Star and Lottie Leask which laid up next to the sinking liner and threw ropes to the stricken men, allowing over 500 soldiers to evacuate the quickly foundering ship. The drifters managed to cut the ropes before Re Umberto broke in two and disappeared below the waves some 15 minutes after stricking the mine. A total of 94 men lost their lives in the sinking, of which most were killed by the initial explosion from the mine. One of the destroyers that was part of the convoy rescued about 100 survivors from Re Umberto and landed them at Valona before returning to sea to carry out an anti-submarine patrol, where she struck another floating mine and suffered the same fate as Re Umberto.

== Wreck ==
The wreck of Re Umberto was discovered in August 2007 by Italian divers at (40°42′N 19°28′E). The current condition of the wreck is unknown.
