= Italian destroyer Impavido (1913) =

Italian destroyer of World War I

History

Kingdom of Italy
- Name: Impavido
- Namesake: "Fearless"
- Builder: Cantiere Pattison, Naples, Kingdom of Italy
- Laid down: 1911
- Launched: 22 March 1913
- Commissioned: 1913
- Reclassified: Torpedo boat 1929
- Stricken: 1 September 1937
- Identification: Pennant number IV
- Fate: Discarded and scrapped

General characteristics
- Type: Destroyer
- Displacement: 672–770 metric tons (741–849 short tons)
- Length: 237 ft 11 in (72.52 m) (wl); 239 ft 6 in (73.00 m) (oa)
- Beam: 24 ft (7.3 m)
- Draft: 7 ft 11 in (2.41 m)
- Propulsion: 2 shafts; 2 × Tosi steam turbines; 4 × Thornycroft boilers; 16,000 hp (11,931 kW) designed/17,620 shp (13,139 kW) maximum
- Speed: 30 knots (56 km/h; 35 mph) designed; 35.79 knots (66.28 km/h; 41.19 mph) maximum
- Endurance: 1,200 nmi (2,200 km; 1,400 mi) at 14 knots (26 km/h; 16 mph); 500 nmi (930 km; 580 mi) at 25 knots (46 km/h; 29 mph); 350 nmi (650 km; 400 mi) at 30 knots (56 km/h; 35 mph)
- Complement: 4–5 officers, 65–74 enlisted men
- Armament: As built: 1 × 4.7 in (120 mm) gun 4 × 3 in (76.2 mm) guns 2 × 17.7 in (450 mm) torpedo tubes After refit: 5 × 4 in (102 mm) guns 1 × 40 mm (1.6 in) AA gun 2 × 17.7 in (450 mm) torpedo tubes

Impavido (English: "Fearless") was an Italian Indomito-class destroyer. Commissioned into service in the Italian Regia Marina (Royal Navy) in 1913, she served in World War I, playing an active role in the Adriatic campaign and seeing action in the Battle of the Strait of Otranto. Reclassified as a torpedo boat in 1929, she was stricken in 1937.

== Construction and commissioning ==
Impavido was laid down at the Cantiere Pattison (English: Pattison Shipyard) in Naples, Italy, in 1911. She was launched on 22 March 1913 and commissioned in 1913.

== Service history ==
=== World War I ===
==== 1915 ====
World War I broke out in 1914, and the Kingdom of Italy entered the war on the side of the Allies with its declaration of war on Austria-Hungary on 23 May 1915. At the time, Impavido and the destroyers Impetuoso, Indomito, Insidioso, Intrepido, and Irrequieto made up the 2nd Destroyer Squadron. The squadron, under the command of Capitano de fregata (Frigate Captain) P. Orsini, was based at Taranto, although either Impetuoso or Indomito or both were visiting La Spezia that day. On 3 July 1915 the squadron was assigned to the 3rd Group of the 4th Naval Division and Orsini, promoted to capitano di vascello (ship-of-the-line captain), took on duty as commander of the 3rd Group in addition to the 2nd Destroyer Squadron.

At 01:00 on 6 July 1915 Impavido and the rest of her squadron got underway from Venice and carried out an offensive reconnaissance sweep toward the east. The ships then headed back toward Venice. At 04:30 they were about 30 nautical miles (56 km; 35 mi) east of Chioggia, where they were to rendezvous with the armored cruiser Amalfi and another destroyer squadron led by the destroyer Bersagliere. Plans called for the combined force to sweep the Gulf of Venice in a search for Austro-Hungarian ships. While heading toward the rendezvous, however, Amalfi was torpedoed by the Austro-Hungarian Navy submarine U-26 and sank in ten minutes.

A few hours after an Austro-Hungarian Navy force subjected the Palagruža (known to the Italians as the Pelagosa) archipelago in the Adriatic Sea to a heavy bombardment during the night of 16–17 August 1915, Impavido, Intrepido, the protected cruiser Quarto, and the destroyers Animoso and Ardito, which were on a cruise in the Adriatic Sea north of the line Brindisi–Cattaro, interrupted their operations to respond. They reached Palagruža at around 10:00 on 17 August 1915.

==== 1916 ====
At 19:00 on 8 June 1916 Impavido, under the command of an officer named Ruggiero, departed Vlorë (known to the Italians as Valona) in the Principality of Albania with Insidioso, the protected cruiser Libia, and the destroyers Espero and Pontiere to escort the armed merchant cruiser Principe Umberto and the troopship Romagna, which had embarked the 2,605 men of the Italian Royal Army′s (Regio Esercito′s) 55th Infantry Regiment for transportation to Italy. The convoy had traveled only a short distance when the Austro-Hungarian submarine U-5 hit Principe Umberto in the stern with two torpedoes. Principe Umberto sank in a few minutes about 15 nautical miles (28 km; 17 mi) southwest of the Karaburun Peninsula (also known as Cape Linguetta) with the loss of 1,926 of the 2,821 men on board, the worst naval disaster of World War I in terms of lives lost. The escorting warships rescued the survivors but could not locate and counterattack U-5.

On 25 June 1916 Impavido, Insidioso, Irrequieto, the protected cruiser Marsala, and the destroyer Audace operated in distant support of an attack by the motor torpedo boats MAS 5 and MAS 7 against Durrës (known to the Italians as Durazzo) on the coast of Albania. The attack resulted in serious damage to the 1,111-gross register ton steamship Sarajevo.

On 24 December 1916 Impavido, the scout cruiser Carlo Mirabello, and the destroyer Ippolito Nievo supported an operation by the motor torpedo boats MAS 3 and MAS 6, which, towed respectively by the coastal torpedo boats 36 PN and 54 AS, were supposed to attack Austro-Hungarian ships in port at Durrës. The Italians aborted the attack when MAS 6 suffered damage in a collision with wreckage 3 nautical miles (5.6 km; 3.5 mi) from Durrës.

==== 1917–1918 ====
On the night of 14–15 May 1917, the Battle of the Strait of Otranto began when the Austro-Hungarian Navy staged a two-pronged attack against the Otranto Barrage in the Strait of Otranto aimed both at destroying naval drifters — armed fishing boats that patrolled the anti-submarine barrier the barrage formed — and, as a diversionary action, at destroying an Italian convoy bound from Greece to Albania. At 04:10 on 15 May, after receiving news of the attack, Impavido, Indomito, Insidioso, Marsala, the scout cruisers Aquila and Carlo Alberto Racchia, and the British Royal Navy light cruiser HMS Liverpool made ready for sea at Brindisi. At 05:30 the formation left Brindisi together with the British light cruiser HMS Dartmouth and two other destroyers, and at 07:45 the Allied force sighted the Austro-Hungarian destroyers Balaton and Csepel. Aquila and the Italian destroyers steered to attack the two Austro-Hungarian ships at 08:10 and opened fire on them at 08:15. In the ensuing exchange of gunfire, Balaton suffered damage and Aquila was hit and immobilized immediately afterwards. The two Austro-Hungarian destroyers ultimately took shelter under the cover of Austro-Hungarian coastal artillery batteries, forcing the Italian ships to give up the pursuit. Following a clash in which other Italian and Austro-Hungarian ships also participated, the battle ended with some ships damaged on both sides, but none sunk.

On 16 July 1917 Impavido, Indomito, Insidioso, Carlo Alberto Racchia, and the scout cruiser Augusto Riboty operated in distant support of an Italian air attack against Durrës carried out by 18 aircraft flying from Brindisi and Vlorë and supported by the torpedo boats Ardea and Pegaso.

By late October 1918, Austria-Hungary had effectively disintegrated, and the Armistice of Villa Giusti, signed on 3 November 1918, went into effect on 4 November 1918 and brought hostilities between Austria-Hungary and the Allies to an end. World War I ended a week later with the armistice between the Allies and the German Empire on 11 November 1918.

=== Post-World War I ===
After the end of World War I, Impavido′s armament was revised, giving her five 102 mm (4 in)/35-caliber guns, a single 40 mm (1.6 in)/35-caliber gun, and four 450-millimetre (17.7 in) torpedo tubes.

Impavido was reclassified as a torpedo boat in 1929. She was struck from the naval register on 1 September 1937 and subsequently scrapped.
