= SM UC-14 =

German Type UC I minelayer submarine or U-boat

Coordinates: 51°23′N 3°11′E

History

German Empire
- Name: UC-14
- Ordered: 23 November 1914
- Builder: AG Weser, Bremen
- Yard number: 229
- Laid down: 28 January 1915
- Launched: 13 May 1915
- Commissioned: 5 June 1915
- Fate: Sunk by mine, 3 October 1917

General characteristics
- Class & type: Type UC I submarine
- Displacement: 168 t (165 long tons), surfaced; 182 t (179 long tons), submerged
- Length: 33.99 m (111 ft 6 in) o/a; 29.62 m (97 ft 2 in) pressure hull
- Beam: 3.15 m (10 ft 4 in)
- Draft: 3.06 m (10 ft 0 in)
- Propulsion: 1 × propeller shaft; 1 × 6-cylinder, 4-stroke diesel engine, 80 PS (59 kW; 79 bhp); 1 × electric motor, 175 PS (129 kW; 173 shp)
- Speed: 6.49 knots (12.02 km/h; 7.47 mph), surfaced; 5.67 knots (10.50 km/h; 6.52 mph), submerged
- Range: 910 nmi (1,690 km; 1,050 mi) at 5 knots (9.3 km/h; 5.8 mph) surfaced; 50 nmi (93 km; 58 mi) at 4 knots (7.4 km/h; 4.6 mph) submerged
- Test depth: 50 m (160 ft)
- Complement: 14
- Armament: 6 × 100 cm (39 in) mine tubes; 12 × UC 120 mines; 1 × 8 mm (0.31 in) machine gun

Service record
- Part of: Pola Flotilla; 5 June 1915 – 9 October 1916; Flandern Flotilla; 11 January 1917 – 3 October 1917
- Commanders: Oblt.z.S. Cäsar Bauer; 5 June 1915 - 6 January 1916; Oblt.z.S. Franz Becker; 7 January – 30 June 1916; Oblt.z.S. Alfred Klatt; 1 July – 9 October 1916; Oblt.z.S. Ulrich Pilzecker; 11 January - 6 July 1917; Oblt.z.S. Helmut Lorenz; 7 July – 13 September 1917; Oblt.z.S. Adolf Feddersen; 14 September – 3 October 1917
- Operations: 38 patrols
- Victories: 4 merchant ships sunk (6,478 GRT); 2 warships sunk (14,107 tons); 10 auxiliary warships sunk (1,704 GRT)

SM UC-14 was a German Type UC I minelayer submarine or U-boat in the German Imperial Navy (German: Kaiserliche Marine) during World War I. The U-boat was ordered on 23 November 1914, laid down on 28 January 1915, and was launched on 13 May 1915. She was commissioned into the German Imperial Navy on 5 June 1915 as SM UC-14. (Note: "SM" stands for "Seiner Majestät" (English: His Majesty's) and combined with the U for Unterseeboot would be translated as His Majesty's Submarine.) Mines laid by UC-14 in her 38 patrols were credited with sinking 16 ships, one of which was the Italian pre-dreadnought battleship Regina Margherita, which at 13,427 tonnes (13,215 long tons) displacement was one of the largest ships sunk by U-boats during the war. UC-14 was mined and sunk on 3 October 1917.

The submarine's wreck was finally located in September 2023

== Design ==
A Type UC I submarine, UC-14 had a displacement of 168 tonnes (165 long tons) when at the surface and 182 tonnes (179 long tons) while submerged. She had a length overall of 33.99 m (111 ft 6 in), a beam of 3.15 m (10 ft 4 in), and a draught of 3.06 m (10 ft 0 in). The submarine was powered by one Benz six-cylinder, four-stroke diesel engine producing 80 metric horsepower (59 kW; 79 shp), an electric motor producing 175 metric horsepower (129 kW; 173 shp), and one propeller shaft. She was capable of operating at depths of up to 50 metres (160 ft).

The submarine had a maximum surface speed of 6.49 knots (12.02 km/h; 7.47 mph) and a maximum submerged speed of 5.67 knots (10.50 km/h; 6.52 mph). When submerged, she could operate for 50 nautical miles (93 km; 58 mi) at 4 knots (7.4 km/h; 4.6 mph); when surfaced, she could travel 910 nautical miles (1,690 km; 1,050 mi) at 5 knots (9.3 km/h; 5.8 mph). UC-14 was fitted with six 100 centimetres (39 in) mine tubes, twelve UC 120 mines, and one 8 millimetres (0.31 in) machine gun. She was built by AG Weser Bremen and her complement was fourteen crew members.

== Summary of raiding history ==
| Date | Name | Nationality | Tonnage (Note: Merchant ship tonnages are in gross register tons. Military vessels are listed by tons displacement.) | Fate |
|---|---|---|---|---|
| 4 December 1915 | Intrepido | Regia Marina | 680 | Sunk |
| 4 December 1915 | Re Umberto | Kingdom of Italy | 2,952 | Sunk |
| 8 January 1916 | Citta Di Palermo | Regia Marina | 3,415 | Sunk |
| 8 January 1916 | HMD Freuchny | Royal Navy | 84 | Sunk |
| 8 January 1916 | HMD Morning Star | Royal Navy | 97 | Sunk |
| 20 February 1916 | HMD Gavenwood | Royal Navy | 88 | Sunk |
| 20 March 1916 | Ginette | French Navy | 272 | Sunk |
| 26 November 1916 | HMD Finross | Royal Navy | 78 | Sunk |
| 26 November 1916 | HMD Michaelmas Daisy | Royal Navy | 99 | Sunk |
| 12 December 1916 | Regina Margherita | Regia Marina | 13,427 | Sunk |
| 30 March 1917 | HMT Christopher | Royal Navy | 316 | Sunk |
| 9 April 1917 | HMT Orthos | Royal Navy | 218 | Sunk |
| 23 May 1917 | HMT Tettenhall | Royal Navy | 227 | Sunk |
| 10 September 1917 | HMT Loch Ard | Royal Navy | 225 | Sunk |
| 2 October 1917 | Willing Boys | United Kingdom | 51 | Sunk |
| 7 October 1917 | Reliance | United Kingdom | 60 | Sunk |
