= Italian cruiser Alessandro Poerio =

Italian Alessandro Poerio-class scout cruiser

History

Kingdom of Italy
- Name: Alessandro Poerio
- Namesake: Alessandro Poerio (1802–1848), Italian patriot and poet
- Operator: Regia Marina (Royal Navy)
- Builder: Gio. Ansaldo & C., Sestri Ponente, Kingdom of Italy
- Laid down: 25 June 1913
- Launched: 4 August 1914
- Commissioned: 25 May 1915
- Reclassified: Destroyer 1921
- Fate: Sold to Spanish Nationalist Navy 24 October 1937
- Stricken: 5 January 1939

Spain
- Name: Huesca
- Namesake: Huesca, a city in northeastern Spain
- Operator: Spanish Nationalist Navy (1937–1939); Spanish Navy (1939–1953)
- Acquired: 24 October 1937
- Decommissioned: 17 August 1953
- Stricken: 17 August 1953
- Fate: Scrapped

General characteristics (as Alessandro Poerio)
- Class & type: Alessandro Poerio-class destroyer
- Displacement: 891 long tons (normal); 1,270 long tons (full load)
- Length: 85 m (278 ft 10 in)
- Beam: 8 m (26 ft 3 in)
- Draft: 3.11 metres (10 ft 2 in)
- Propulsion: 2 Belluzzo steam turbines, 24,000 hp (17,897 kW), 3 Yarrow three-drum water-tube boilers, 2 shafts
- Speed: 32 knots (59 km/h; 37 mph)
- Range: 2,400 nmi (4,400 km; 2,800 mi) at 13 knots (24 km/h; 15 mph)
- Crew: 109
- Armament: Planned: 4 x 102/35 mm (4 in) guns; 8 x 450-millimetre (17.7 in) torpedo tubes; As built: 6 x 102/35 mm (4 in) guns; 4 x 450-millimetre (17.7 in) torpedo tubes; 42 x mines; Added 1916: 2 x 76/40 mm Mod 16 RM guns (removed 1917); Added 1917: 2 x 40/39 mm guns; 1918: 6 x 102/45 mm (4 in) guns; 2 x 40/39 mm guns; 4 x 450-millimetre (17.7 in) torpedo tubes; 42 x mines; Removed 1927: 1 x 40/39 mm gun

General characteristics (as Huesca)
- Class & type: Alessandro Poerio-class destroyer
- Displacement: 841 long tons standard; 911 long tons full load
- Length: 86 m (282 ft 2 in)
- Beam: 8 m (26 ft 3 in)
- Draft: 2.8 metres (9 ft 2 in)
- Propulsion: 2 Belluzzo steam turbines, 24,000 hp (17,897 kW), 5 Yarrow boilers, 2 shafts
- Speed: 31 knots (57 km/h; 36 mph)
- Crew: 130
- Armament: 5 x 102/35 mm (4 in) guns; 2 x 37 mm guns; 2 x 20 mm guns; 4 x 450-millimetre (17.7 in) torpedo tubes; 42 x mines

Alessandro Poerio was an Italian scout cruiser, the lead ship of the Alessandro Poerio class. Commissioned into service in the Italian Regia Marina (Royal Navy) in 1915, she served during World War I, participating in the Adriatic campaign, initially operating in the upper Adriatic Sea and later in the southern Adriatic. She took part in 66 operations during the war, often supporting raids by Italian motor torpedo boats. She was reclassified as a destroyer in 1921 due to her light displacement. Like her sister ships, Cesare Rossarol and Guglielmo Pepe, she was named after a famous Neapolitan light cavalryman who helped defend Venice from attacks by the Imperial Austrian Army during the revolutions in 1848.

In 1937, Fascist Italy sold the ship to the Nationalist faction in Spain during the Spanish Civil War. Renamed Huesca, the ship subsequently served in the Spanish Navy until she was stricken in 1953.

== Design ==
Alessandro Poerio was an Italian "light scout cruiser" (Italian:esploratore leggero) measuring 85 m (278 ft 10 in) long and 8 m (26 ft 3 in) in beam. She had three Yarrow three-drum water-tube boilers with water pipes, two groups of Belluzzo steam turbines rated at 24,000 hp (17,897 kW), and two three-blade propellers. Her fuel capacity of 325 tons gave her a range of 2,400 nautical miles (4,400 km; 2,800 mi) at 13 knots (24 km/h; 15 mph). She could launch torpedoes while maintaining a constant speed of over 30 knots (56 km/h; 35 mph). Her normal displacement was 891 tons standard, and her full-load displacement was 1,270 tons.

Plans originally called for Alessandro Poerio to have an armament of four 102/35 mm guns and eight 450-millimetre (17.7 in) torpedo tubes, but was revised during construction, and she entered service with six 102/35-millimetre guns and four 450-millimetre (17.7 in) torpedo tubes, and a minelaying capacity of 42 mines, making her armament equivalent to that of an Austro-Hungarian Novara-class scout cruiser. In 1917 two 40/39 mm guns were installed aboard her. In 1918, she was refitted with 102/45 mm guns.

== Construction and commissioning ==
Alessandro Poerio was laid down by Gio. Ansaldo & C. at Sestri Ponente, Italy, on 25 June 1913. She was launched on 4 August 1914 and commissioned on 25 May 1915.

== Service history ==
=== Regia Marina ===
==== World War I ====
===== 1915–1916 =====
World War I began in 1914, and the Kingdom of Italy entered the war on the side of the Allies with its declaration of war on Austria-Hungary on 23 May 1915. Alessandro Poerio entered service two days after Italy declared war. On 30 December 1915 she became part of the 2nd Scouting Group of the 4th Naval Division along with her sister ships Cesare Rossarol and Guglielmo Pepe, based at Venice.

On 1–2 November 1916, Alessandro Poerio, Guglielmo Pepe, and the destroyers Francesco Nullo, and Giuseppe Missori made ready to provide possible support to an incursion by MAS motor torpedo boats into the Fasana Channel on the southwest coast of Istria, a peninsula on the coast of Austria-Hungary.

An Austro-Hungarian Navy force consisting of the scout cruiser Helgoland and the destroyers Balaton, Csepel, Lika, Orjen, Tatra, and Triglav left Cattaro on 18 October 1917 to attack Italian convoys. The Austro-Hungarians found no convoys, so Helgoland and Lika moved to within sight of Brindisi to entice Italian ships into chasing them and lure the Italians into an ambush by the Austro-Hungarian submarines U-32 and U-40. At 06:30 on 19 October 1917, Alessandro Poerio, Guglielmo Pepe, and the destroyers Insidioso, Pilade Bronzetti, and Simone Schiaffino got underway from Brindisi to pursue the Austro-Hungarians. The destroyers Ippolito Nievo and Rosolino Pilo and the British light cruiser HMS Weymouth diverted from a voyage from Vlorë (known to the Italians as Valona) on the coast of the Principality of Albania to Brindisi to join the pursuit. After a long chase which also saw some Italian air attacks on the Austro-Hungarian ships, the Austro-Hungarians escaped and all the Italian ships returned to port without damage.

On 10 March 1918, the destroyer Antonio Mosto, with the motor torpedo boat MAS 100 in tow, and Ippolito Nievo, towing MAS 99, set out for a raid on Portorož (known to the Italians as Portorose) on the coast of Austria-Hungary, supported by Alessandro Poerio, Cesare Rossarol, Pilade Bronzetti, the scout cruisers Augusto Riboty and Carlo Mirabello, the destroyer Giacinto Carini, and a French Navy destroyer squadron led by the destroyer Casque. Antonio Mosto, Ippolito Nievo, MAS 99, and MAS 100 reached the vicinity of Portorož, but then had to postpone the operation due to bad weather. The ships attempted the raid again on 16 March, but adverse weather again forced its postponement. They made a third attempt on 8 April 1918, but after aerial reconnaissance ascertained that the port of Portorož was empty, the Italians again called off the operation.

On 2 October 1918 Alessandro Poerio, Cesare Rossarol, Gulglielmo Pepe, Ippolito Nievo, and Simone Schiaffino were at sea with the battleship Dante Alighieri and the scout cruiser Carlo Alberto Racchia to provide distant cover for a British and Italian naval bombardment of Durrës. The main mission of Alessandro Poerio′s force was to counter any attack against the bombardment force by Austro-Hungarian ships based at Cattaro.

By late October 1918, Austria-Hungary had effectively disintegrated, and the Armistice of Villa Giusti, signed on 3 November 1918, went into effect on 4 November 1918 and brought hostilities between Austria-Hungary and the Allies to an end. World War I ended with an armistice between the Allies and the German Empire on 11 November 1918.

==== Post-World War I ====
In 1921, Alessandro Poerio was reclassified as a destroyer. She made various cruises and took part in representation missions in the Aegean Sea and Black Sea. In 1927, she underwent modifications that included the removal of one of her 40/39 mm guns. In 1933, her commanding officer was Capitano di fregata (Frigate Captain) Ignazio Castrogiovanni, who as a capitano di vascello (ship-of-the-line captain) during World War II would receive a posthumous Gold Medal of Military Valor as commanding officer of the destroyer Aviere in 1942.

During 1936, Alessandro Poerio underwent minor repairs and maintenance. With the Spanish Civil War underway and the Nationalist faction in Spain in need of destroyers, the Spanish Nationalists entered into negotiations with Fascist Italy for the purchase of destroyers from the Regia Marina. The Nationalists viewed the Italian price as excessive given the age of the destroyers, which were reaching the end of their useful service lives, and Italian Prime Minister Benito Mussolini demanded payment in cash in foreign currency, but after lengthy and difficult negotiations, the Nationalists agreed to buy Alessandro Peorio and Guglielmo Pepe for just over 5 million pesetas each.

The Spanish commanding officers and other Spanish officers went to an Italian shipyard to begin the process of taking possession of the ships. Their crews traveled separately, boarding two merchant ships in Spain on 7 October 1937 and arriving at Porto Conte, a bay on the coast of Sardinia, on 9 October, to meet the ships. The Italian sale of the two ships to the Spanish Nationalists became final on 24 October 1937.

Old ships by 1937, Alessandro Poerio and Guglielmo Pepe had worn-out propulsion machinery and, in the view of the Spanish Nationalists, inadequate armament. They underwent major modifications at an Italian shipyard in which their hulls were lengthened by 1 metre (3 ft 3 in), their draft was reduced to 2.8 metres (9 ft 2 in), their original boilers were replaced by five Yarrow boilers, they had one 102-millimetre (4 in) gun and both 40-millimetre guns were removed, and they each had two 37-millimetre and two 20-millimetre guns installed. Their standard displacement dropped to 845 tons and their full-load displacement to 911 tons, their maximum speed fell to 31 knots (57 km/h; 36 mph), and their complement rose to 130 men each. With these modifications complete, the Italians handed them over to their Spanish crews in Sardinia in November 1937, although the Italians did not strike Alessandro Poerio from the Regia Marina′s naval register until 5 January 1939.

=== Spanish Navy ===
==== Spanish Civil War ====
The Spanish Nationalists renamed the ship Huesca. Manned by a Spanish crew, she departed Sardinia under the command of Capitán de corbeta (Corvette Captain) Luis Carrero Blanco, a future admiral general and prime minister of Spain, on 29 November 1937 in company with Teruel (the former Guglielmo Pepe) bound for Palma de Mallorca on Mallorca in the Balearic Islands. During the voyage, she suffered an engine breakdown, and Teruel had to tow her the rest of the way to Palma de Mallorca. Upon arrival, she joined the Nationalist destroyer flotilla based there, which also included Teruel, Ceuta (formerly the Italian Falco), Melilla (formerly the Italian Aquila), and Velasco. The flotilla was assigned to convoy escort duties, support to ground operations, the interdiction of merchant ships of the Spanish Republican faction, and antisubmarine patrols. Capitán de fragata (Frigate Captain) Francisco Regalado Rodríguez, a future admiral and Minister of the Navy, took command of the flotilla on 5 December 1937.

After repairs, Huesca put to sea from Palma de Mallorca for the first time on 14 December 1937, but her boilers soon caught fire and she had to return to base. Frequent mechanical difficulties would dog her throughout the Spanish Civil War.

Seaworthy after additional repairs, Huesca made her first successful sortie, getting underway from Palma de Mallorca on 25 January 1938 to patrol the Spanish coast off Valencia with Velasco. She again was at sea in early February, and on the night of 1–2 February 1938 she joined Melilla and the heavy cruiser Baleares in supporting an Aviación Nacional (Nationalist Air Force) raid on the Arsenal de Cartagena at Cartagena.

On 5 March 1938, Huesca, Teruel, Velasco and the gunboats Canalejas and Cánovas del Castillo escorted the merchant ships Umbe Mendi and Aizkorri Mendi, which were on a voyage from Italy to Cádiz. At 17:30 that afternoon they rendezvoused south of Ibiza with a cruiser division which had sortied from Palma de Mallorca to take over the escort. The gunboats and destroyers then returned to base, the gunboats heading for Ibiza and the destroyers for Palma de Mallorca. The destroyers and gunboats thus missed the Battle of Cape Palos, in which a Spanish Republican Navy force sank Baleares on the night of 5–6 March. Huesca got underway from Palma de Mallorca on 14 March 1938, to escort a convoy, but had to return to port escorting Teruel after Teruel suffered a major mechanical breakdown.

On 5 April 1938, Capitán de corbeta (Corvette Captain) Félix de Ozámiz succeeded Carrero Blanco as Huesca′s commanding officer. Under his command, she departed Palma de Mallorca as part of a flotilla on 24 May 1938, and that night Teruel accidentally rammed her stern. The seriously damaged Huesca returned to Palma de Mallorca, which she reached with considerable difficulty. Teruel, with a damaged bow, also returned to Palma de Mallorca. After emergency repairs, the two destroyers departed Palma de Mallorca on 14 June 1938 and proceeded to Cádiz, where Huesca was under repair until 20 August 1938.

In the last days of August 1938, Huesca participated along with a large part of the Nationalist fleet in an operation to intercept the Spanish Republican Navy destroyer José Luis Díez. The operation forced José Luis Díez to take refuge at Gibraltar. Huesca then returned to Palma de Mallorca in September 1938, continuing with blockade operations and capturing the motorsailer Arsenio off Castellón on the morning of 17 October 1938. She left Palma de Mallorca on 4 November 1938 and deployed to Ceuta to watch the Strait of Gibraltar for a possible departure of José Luis Díez from Gibraltar, then returned to Palma de Mallorca on 11 November.

On 11 December 1938, Huesca′s squadron and the cruiser division left Palma de Mallorca to patrol off Catalonia, but bad weather forced the ships into port at Pollensa. From mid-December 1938, Huesca and Teruel patrolled near the Columbretes Islands.

On 2 January 1939, Huesca departed Palma de Mallorca with the cruiser division bound for Gandía, then steamed north to patrol off Tarragona before refueling at Palma de Mallorca. She patrolled off Catalonia from late January until 4 February 1939, when she returned to Palma de Mallorca.

On 9 February 1939, Huesca was among a number of Spanish Nationalist ships that sortied to support an uprising against the Republican government by the garrison of Ciutadella de Menorca on Menorca in the Balearic Islands, transporting troops which occupied Menorca for Nationalist Spain. After repairs at Cádiz at the beginning of March 1939, Huesca got underway from Cádiz on 5 March with the heavy cruiser Canarias bound for the Province of Murcia, Spain, where they gathered with several other Nationalist ships in response to an uprising in Cartagena against the central government of the Second Spanish Republic and its supporters in the Communist Party of Spain. Beginning in the Arsenal de Cartagena, the uprising began on 4 March, and Spanish Republican forces put down it down on 7 March before Nationalist forces could intervene directly, although Huesca was among Nationalist ships which kept watch on the approaches to Cartagena during the uprising.

==== Post-civil war ====
The Spanish Civil War ended in victory for the Nationalists on 1 April 1939, and Huesca was incorporated into the post-civil war Spanish Navy. She had proven mechanically unreliable during the conflict, and the Spanish Navy made no attempt to upgrade her capabilities after the civil war. Based at Mahón, she was relegated to use as an auxiliary and training ship. On the morning of 22 October 1940 Huesca, Teruel, and the destroyer Churruca arrived in Barcelona carrying 100 students from the Naval School in San Fernando on a training voyage that visited several ports.

Huesca was decommissioned and stricken from the naval register on 17 August 1953. She subsequently was scrapped.
