= Italian cruiser Guglielmo Pepe =

Italian Alessandro Poerio-class scout cruiser

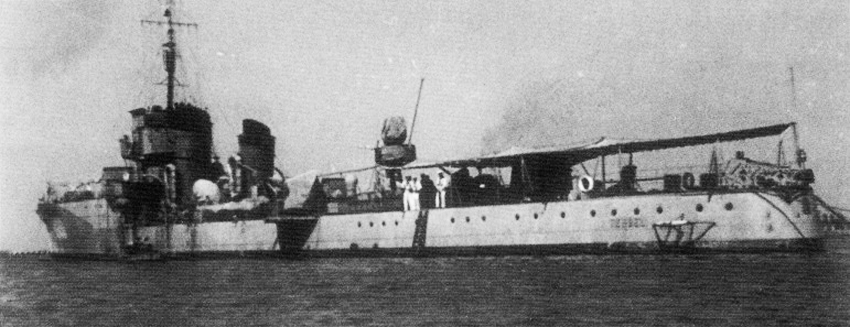
- Teruel (ex-Guglielmo Pepe)

History

Kingdom of Italy
- Name: Guglielmo Pepe
- Namesake: Guglielmo Pepe (1783–1855), Italian general, patriot, and historian
- Operator: Regia Marina (Royal Navy)
- Builder: Gio. Ansaldo & C., Sestri Ponente, Kingdom of Italy
- Laid down: 2 July 1913
- Launched: 17 September 1914
- Commissioned: 20 August 1915
- Reclassified: Destroyer 1921
- Fate: Sold to Spanish Nationalist Navy October 1937
- Stricken: 5 January 1939
- Motto: Nullum opus arduum ("No Hard Work")

Spain
- Name: Teruel
- Namesake: Teruel, a city in eastern Spain
- Operator: Spanish Nationalist Navy (1937–1939); Spanish Navy (1939–1948)
- Acquired: October 1937
- Decommissioned: 24 January 1948
- Stricken: 17 August 1948
- Fate: Scrapped

General characteristics (as Gulgielmo Pepe)
- Class & type: Alessandro Poerio-class destroyer
- Displacement: 891 long tons (normal); 1,270 long tons (full load)
- Length: 85 m (278 ft 10 in)
- Beam: 8 m (26 ft 3 in)
- Draft: 3.11 metres (10 ft 2 in)
- Propulsion: 2 Belluzzo steam turbines, 24,000 hp (17,897 kW), 3 Yarrow three-drum water-tube boilers, 2 shafts
- Speed: 32 knots (59 km/h; 37 mph)
- Range: 2,400 nmi (4,400 km; 2,800 mi) at 13 knots (24 km/h; 15 mph)
- Crew: 109
- Armament: Planned: 4 x 102/35 mm (4 in) guns; 8 x 450-millimetre (17.7 in) torpedo tubes; As built: 6 x 102/35 mm (4 in) guns; 4 x 450-millimetre (17.7 in) torpedo tubes; 42 x mines; Added 1916: 2 x 76/40 mm Mod 16 RM guns (removed 1917); Added 1917: 2 x 40/39 mm guns; 1918: 6 x 102/45 mm (4 in) guns; 2 x 40/39 mm guns; 4 x 450-millimetre (17.7 in) torpedo tubes; 42 x mines

General characteristics (as Teruel)
- Class & type: Alessandro Poerio-class destroyer
- Displacement: 841 long tons standard; 911 long tons full load
- Length: 86 m (282 ft 2 in)
- Beam: 8 m (26 ft 3 in)
- Draft: 2.8 metres (9 ft 2 in)
- Propulsion: 2 Belluzzo steam turbines, 24,000 hp (17,897 kW), 5 Yarrow boilers, 2 shafts
- Speed: 31 knots (57 km/h; 36 mph)
- Crew: 130
- Armament: 5 x 102/35 mm (4 in) guns; 2 x 37 mm guns; 2 x 20 mm guns; 4 x 450-millimetre (17.7 in) torpedo tubes; 42 x mines

Guglielmo Pepe was an Italian Alessandro Poerio-class scout cruiser. Commissioned into service in the Italian Regia Marina (Royal Navy) in 1915, she served during World War I, participating in the Adriatic campaign, often supporting raids by Italian motor torpedo boats. She was reclassified as a destroyer in 1921 due to her light displacement. Like her sister ships, Alessandro Poerio and Cesare Rossarol, she was named after a famous Neapolitan light cavalryman who helped defend Venice from attacks by the Imperial Austrian Army during the revolutions in 1848.

In 1937, Fascist Italy sold the ship to the Nationalist faction in Spain during the Spanish Civil War. Renamed Teruel, the ship subsequently served in the Spanish Navy until she was stricken in 1948.

== Design ==
Guglielmo Pepe was an Italian "light scout cruiser" (Italian:esploratore leggero) measuring 85 m (278 ft 10 in) long and 8 m (26 ft 3 in) in beam. She had three Yarrow three-drum water-tube boilers with water pipes, two groups of Belluzzo steam turbines rated at 24,000 hp (17,897 kW), and two three-blade propellers. Her fuel capacity of 325 tons gave her a range of 2,400 nautical miles (4,400 km; 2,800 mi) at 13 knots (24 km/h; 15 mph). She could launch torpedoes while maintaining a constant speed of over 30 knots (56 km/h; 35 mph). Her normal displacement was 891 tons standard, and her full-load displacement was 1,270 tons.

Plans originally called for Guglielmo Pepe to have an armament of four 102/35 mm guns and eight 450-millimetre (17.7 in) torpedo tubes, but was revised during construction, and she entered service with six 102/35-millimetre guns and four 450-millimetre (17.7 in) torpedo tubes, and a minelaying capacity of 42 mines, making her armament equivalent to that of an Austro-Hungarian Novara-class scout cruiser. In 1916, two 76/40 mm Mod 16 RM guns were installed aboard her; they were removed in 1917 when two 40/39 mm guns replaced them. In 1918, she was refitted with 102/45 mm guns.

== Construction and commissioning ==
Guglielmo Pepe was laid down by Gio. Ansaldo & C. at Sestri Ponente, Italy, on 2 July 1913. She was launched on 17 September 1914 and commissioned on 20 August 1915.

== Service history ==
=== Regia Marina ===
==== World War I ====
===== 1915–1916 =====
World War I was raging when Guglielmo Pepe entered service in August 1915. On 30 December 1915 she became part of the 2nd Scouting Group of the 4th Naval Division along with her sister ships Alessandro Poerio and Cesare Rossarol, based at Venice.

On 3 May 1916, Guglielmo Pepe and Cesare Rossarol got underway with the destroyers Francesco Nullo and Giuseppe Missori to provide distant support to the destroyers Fuciliere and Zeffiro as they laid a minefield in the Adriatic Sea off Šibenik (known to the Italians as Sebenico) on the coast of Austria-Hungary. Off Punta Maestra, the Italian formation sighted four Austro-Hungarian Navy Huszár-class destroyers and six Austro-Hungarian torpedo boats and steered to attack them. While the Austro-Hungarian ships headed toward the Austro-Hungarian naval base at Pola with the Italians in pursuit, three Austro-Hungarian seaplanes attacked the Italian ships. The Italians repelled the attack, but at 15:50, after an Austro-Hungarian cruiser and two additional Austro-Hungarian torpedo boats departed Pola to support the Austro-Hungarian ships, the Italian force gave up the chase and withdrew. Meanwhile, Fuciliere and Zeffiro succeeded in laying the minefield during the night of 3–4 May 1916.

Guglielmo Pepe and Cesare Rossarol laid a minefield off Ancona, Italy, on 11 May 1916.

Escorted as far as the Austro-Hungarian defensive barrage by Guglielmo Pepe and Cesare Rossarol and supported by the destroyers Alpino and Fuciliere and the coastal torpedo boats 40 PN and 46 OS, the destroyer Zeffiro, under the command of Capitano di fregata (Frigate captain) Costanzo Ciano and with Lieutenant Nazario Sauro, an Italian irredentist, aboard as pilot, entered the port of Poreč on the western side of Istria, a peninsula on Austria-Hungary's coast, at dawn on 12 June 1916. A group of men from Zeffiro, including Sauro, captured a gendarme who showed them the location of an aircraft hangar. In the meantime, Alpino, Fuciliere, 40 PN, and 46 OS had joined Zeffiro, and at 04:50 they began a bombardment which lasted about 20 minutes. The hangar suffered damage from hits by 76-millimetre (3 in) shells from the Italian ships. Austro-Hungarian coastal artillery batteries returned fire, and then 10 Austro-Hungarian seaplanes attacked the Italian ships. Allied aircraft came to the defense of the Italians, resulting in a dogfight in which Austro-Hungarian seaplanes collided with two Italian and one French aircraft. All the Italian ships returned to base, although they suffered damage and a number of casualties, including four men killed in action.

On 1–2 November 1916, Guglielmo Pepe, Alessandro Poerio, Francesco Nullo, and Giuseppe Missori made ready to provide possible support to an incursion by MAS motor torpedo boats into the Fasana Channel on the southwest coast of Istria.

===== 1917–1918 =====
On the night of 25–26 August 1917 Guglielmo Pepe and Cesare Rossarol escorted the coastal torpedo boats 34 PN, with the motor torpedo boat MAS 6 in tow, and 35 PN, towing the motor torpedo boat MAS 91, to a point where the two MAS boats dropped their towlines The MAS boats then raided the harbor at Durrës (known to the Italians as Durazzo) on the coast of the Principality of Albania in an attempt to attack steamers there. The MAS boats found no steamers in the harbor and withdrew without results.

An Austro-Hungarian Navy force consisting of the scout cruiser Helgoland and the destroyers Balaton, Csepel, Lika, Orjen, Tatra, and Triglav left Cattaro on 18 October 1917 to attack Italian convoys. The Austro-Hungarians found no convoys, so Helgoland and Lika moved to within sight of Brindisi to entice Italian ships into chasing them and lure the Italians into an ambush by the Austro-Hungarian submarines U-32 and U-40. At 06:30 on 19 October 1917, Guglielmo Pepe, with Contrammiraglio (Counter admiral) Biscaretti embarked, got underway from Brindisi with Alessandro Poerio and the destroyers Pilade Bronzetti, Insidioso and Simone Schiaffino to pursue the Austro-Hungarians. The destroyers Ippolito Nievo and Rosolino Pilo and the British light cruiser HMS Weymouth diverted from a voyage from Vlorë (known to the Italians as Valona), Albania, to Brindisi to join the pursuit. After a long chase which also saw some Italian air attacks on the Austro-Hungarian ships, the Austro-Hungarians escaped and all the Italian ships returned to port without damage.

Guglielmo Pepe, Cesare Rossarol, Ippolito Nievo, and the destroyer Indomito were assigned to support a raid against Durrës on the night of 10–11 February 1918 by the motor torpedo boats MAS 9 and MAS 20, towed by the coastal torpedo boats 37 PN and 38 PN. Bad weather forced the cancellation of the raid.

At 23:54 on 14 May 1918, Ippolito Nievo, with MAS 99 in tow, and Pilade Bronzetti, towing MAS 100, dropped their tow cables about 15 nautical miles (28 km; 17 mi) from Bar (known to the Italians as Antivari) on the coast of Montenegro. The two MAS boats, after an unsuccessful attack on Bar, reunited with the two destroyers. Guglielmo Pepe and Cesare Rossarol supported the operation, which concluded with the return of the ships to Brindisi at 09:00 on 15 May.

On 2 October 1918 Gulglielmo Pepe, Alessandro Poerio, Cesare Rossarol, Ippolito Nievo, and Simone Schiaffino were at sea with the battleship Dante Alighieri and the scout cruiser Carlo Alberto Racchia to provide distant cover for a British and Italian naval bombardment of Durrës. The main mission of Gulglielmo Pepe′s force was to counter any attack against the bombardment force by Austro-Hungarian ships based at Cattaro.

By late October 1918, Austria-Hungary had effectively disintegrated, and the Armistice of Villa Giusti, signed on 3 November 1918, went into effect on 4 November 1918 and brought hostilities between Austria-Hungary and the Allies to an end. On 10 November 1918, Guglielmo Pepe and Cesare Rossarol transported Italian infantry units to Pola to reinforce Italian units already occupying the city. World War I ended the next day, with an armistice between the Allies and the German Empire on 11 November 1918. On 27 November 1918, Guglielmo Pepe took possession of Rab, an island off the coast of Dalmatia.

==== Post-World War I ====
In 1921, Guglielmo Pepe was reclassified as a destroyer. She made various cruises and took part in representation missions in the Aegean Sea and Black Sea. In 1922, the city of La Spezia awarded battle ensigns to Guglielmo Pepe, the scout cruiser Falco, the destroyer Angelo Bassini, and the torpedo boat Premuda.

During 1936, Guglielmo Pepe underwent minor repairs and maintenance. With the Spanish Civil War underway and the Nationalist faction in Spain in need of destroyers, the Spanish Nationalists entered into negotiations with Fascist Italy for the purchase of destroyers from the Regia Marina. The Nationalists viewed the Italian price as excessive given the age of the destroyers, which were reaching the end of their useful service lives, and Italian Prime Minister Benito Mussolini demanded payment in cash in foreign currency, but after lengthy and difficult negotiations, the Nationalists agreed to buy Alessandro Peorio and Guglielmo Pepe for just over 5 million pesetas each.

The Spanish commanding officers and other Spanish officers went to an Italian shipyard to begin the process of taking possession of the ships. Their crews traveled separately, boarding two merchant ships in Spain on 7 October 1937 and arriving at Porto Conte, a bay on the coast of Sardinia, on 9 October to meet the ships. The Italian sale of the two ships to the Spanish Nationalists became final on 24 October 1937.

Old ships by 1937, Guglielmo Pepe and Alessandro Poerio had worn-out propulsion machinery and, in the view of the Spanish Nationalists, inadequate armament. They underwent major modifications at an Italian shipyard in which their hulls were lengthened by 1 metre (3 ft 3 in), their draft was reduced to 2.8 metres (9 ft 2 in), their original boilers were replaced by five Yarrow boilers, they had one 102-millimetre (4 in) gun and both 40-millimetre guns removed, and they each had two 37-millimetre and two 20-millimetre guns installed. Their standard displacement dropped to 845 tons and their full-load displacement to 911 tons, their maximum speed fell to 31 knots (57 km/h; 36 mph), and their complement rose to 130 men each. With these modifications complete, the Italians handed them over to the Spanish crews in Sardinia in November 1937, although the Italians did not strike Guglielmo Pepe from the Regia Marina′s naval register until 5 January 1939.

=== Spanish Navy ===
==== Spanish Civil War ====
The Spanish Nationalists renamed the ship Teruel. Manned by a Spanish crew, she departed Sardinia on 29 November 1937 in company with Huesca (the former Alessandro Poerio) bound for Palma de Mallorca on Mallorca in the Balearic Islands. During the voyage, Huesca suffered an engine breakdown and Teruel had to tow her the rest of the way to Palma de Mallorca. Upon arrival, Teruel joined the Nationalist destroyer flotilla based there, which also included Huesca, Ceuta (formerly the Italian Falco), Melilla (formerly the Italian Aquila), and Velasco. The flotilla was assigned to convoy escort duties, support to ground operations, the interdiction of merchant ships of the Spanish Republican faction, and antisubmarine patrols. Capitán de fragata (Frigate Captain) Francisco Regalado Rodríguez, a future admiral and Minister of the Navy, took command of the flotilla on 5 December 1937.

Teruel sortied from Palma de Mallorca for the first time on 14 December 1937 but had to return to base due to a mechanical breakdown. On the afternoon of 22 February 1938 she joined Melilla and Velasco in escorting the merchant ship Pasajes, which was making a voyage in the Balearic Islands from Formentera to Mallorca.

On 5 March 1938, Teruel, Huesca, Velasco, and the gunboats Canalejas and Cánovas del Castillo escorted the merchant ships Umbe Mendi and Aizkorri Mendi, which were on a voyage from Italy to Cádiz. At 17:30 that afternoon they rendezvoused south of Ibiza with a cruiser division which had sortied from Palma de Mallorca to take over the escort. The gunboats and destroyers then returned to base, the gunboats heading for Ibiza and the destroyers for Palma de Mallorca. The destroyers and gunboats thus missed the Battle of Cape Palos, in which a Spanish Republican Navy force sank the Nationalist heavy cruiser Baleares on the night of 5–6 March.

Teruel got underway from Palma de Mallorca on 14 March 1938 to escort a convoy but suffered a mechanical breakdown that forced her to return to port escorted by Huesca. After repairs, she sortied from Palma de Mallorca several times during April 1938 to conduct antisubmarine patrols in local waters.

Teruel departed Palma de Mallorca as part of a flotilla on 24 May 1938, and that night she accidentally rammed Huesca. The collision destroyed Teruel′s bow and badly damaged Huesca′s stern. Both ships returned to Palma de Mallorca, which Teruel reached on 25 May. After emergency repairs, the two destroyers departed Palma de Mallorca on 14 June 1938 and proceeded to Cádiz for permanent repairs.

After completion of her repairs, Teruel resumed operations from Palma de Mallorca. On 3 November 1938 she got underway as part of a Nationalist squadron heading for the Strait of Gibraltar, but a major mechanical breakdown forced her to proceed instead to Ceuta on the coast of North Africa, escorted by the light cruiser Navarra. After again undergoing repairs, Teruel returned to Palma de Mallorca on 11 November 1938.

Teruel conducted patrols along the coast of Catalonia during December 1938 and January 1939 to intercept merchant ships bound for Republican-controlled ports. On 9 February 1939, Teruel and Huesca were among a number of Spanish Nationalist ships that sortied to support an uprising against the Republican government by the garrison of Ciutadella de Menorca on Menorca in the Balearic Islands, transporting troops which occupied Menorca for Nationalist Spain. On 12 February 1939, Teruel, Ceuta, and Huesca entered Mahón. As February continued, she resumed patrols off Catalonia. She took part in a naval review at Salou in Catalonia on 22 February, then headed to Cádiz for repairs.

Teruel′s repairs were completed in early March 1939, and she subsequently operated near Cartagena. The Spanish Civil War ended on 1 April 1939 in victory for the Nationalists. Among Teruel′s most important achievements during the war were the capture of the Soviet steamer Zyrianin and of the American tanker Nantucket Chief, which the Nationalists later handed over to international authorities at Gibraltar.

==== Later service ====
After the Spanish Civil War ended, Teruel was incorporated into the post-civil war Spanish Navy. She had proven mechanically unreliable during the conflict, and the Spanish Navy made no attempt to upgrade her capabilities after the civil war. Based at Mahón, she was relegated to use as an auxiliary and training ship. On the morning of 22 October 1940 Teruel, Huesca, and the destroyer Churruca arrived in Barcelona carrying 100 students from the Naval School in San Fernando on a training voyage that visited several ports. On 30 June 1941, Teruel left Cadiz with the Spanish High Commissioner in Morocco and his family aboard bound for Ceuta and Tetouan on the coast of North Africa.

Teruel was decommissioned on 24 January 1948 and stricken from the naval register on 17 August 1948. She subsequently was scrapped.
