= Italian cruiser Falco =

Italian Aquila-class scout cruiser

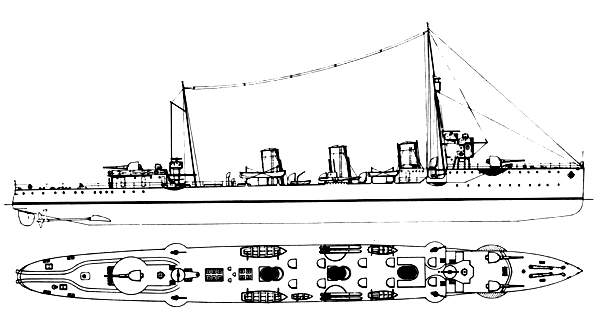
- Plan and right elevation line drawing of the Vifor-class destroyers as completed for Italy as scout cruisers.

History

Kingdom of Romania
- Name: Viscol
- Namesake: Blizzard
- Operator: Royal Romanian Navy (planned)
- Ordered: 1913
- Builder: Cantiere Pattison, Naples, Kingdom of Italy
- Fate: Requisitioned by Kingdom of Italy 5 June 1915

Kingdom of Italy
- Name: Falco
- Namesake: Falcon
- Operator: Regia Marina (Royal Navy)
- Acquired: 5 June 1915
- Laid down: 19 August 1916
- Launched: 16 August 1919
- Completed: 20 January 1920
- Commissioned: 20 January 1920
- Fate: Unofficially transferred to Spanish Nationalist Navy 11 October 1937; Officially transferred 6 January 1939
- Reclassified: Destroyer 5 September 1938
- Stricken: 6 January 1939

Spain
- Name: Velasco Ceuta
- Namesake: Cover name to confuse the ship's identity with that of the destroyer Velasco
- Operator: Spanish Nationalist Navy (1937–1939); Spanish Navy (1939–1948)
- Acquired: 10 or 11 October 1937 (unofficial transfer); 6 January 1939 (official transfer)
- Renamed: Ceuta 6 March 1939
- Namesake: Ceuta, a Spanish city on the coast of North Africa
- Stricken: 1948
- Decommissioned: 1949
- Fate: Scrapped

General characteristics (as built)
- Class & type: Vifor-class destroyer
- Displacement: 1,594 long tons (1,620 t) (normal); 1,760 long tons (1,790 t) (full load)
- Length: 94.7 m (310 ft 8 in) (overall)
- Beam: 9.5 m (31 ft 2 in)
- Draft: 3.6 m (11 ft 10 in)
- Installed power: 4 Thornycroft boilers; 40,000 shp (29,828 kW)
- Propulsion: 2 shafts; 2 geared steam turbines
- Speed: 34 knots (63 km/h; 39 mph)
- Range: 3,000 nmi (5,600 km; 3,500 mi) at 15 knots (28 km/h; 17 mph)
- Complement: 146
- Armament: 2 × twin 120-millimetre (4.7 in) guns; 1 x single 120-millimetre (4.7 in) guns; 2 × single 76 mm (3 in) AA guns; 2 × twin 457 mm (17.7 in) torpedo tubes; 24 mines

Falco was an Italian Regia Marina (Royal Navy) scout cruiser in commission from 1920 to 1937. She was laid down for the Royal Romanian Navy as the destroyer Viscol but the Kingdom of Italy requisitioned her before her construction bean. Falco was not completed until after the end of World War I, but served in the Regia Marina during the interwar period.

In 1937, Italy transferred Falco to Nationalist Spain. Reclassified as a destroyer and renamed Ceuta, she served in the Spanish Nationalist Navy during the Spanish Civil War and subsequently in the Spanish Navy. She was stricken in 1948 and scrapped.

== Design ==
The Kingdom of Romania ordered the ship as Viscol, one of the first four of a planned 12-ship Vifor class of destroyers for the Royal Romanian Navy envisioned under the Romanian 1912 naval program. Romanian specifications called for the Vifor-class ships to be large destroyers optimized for service in the confined waters of the Black Sea, with a 10-hour endurance at full speed and armed with three 120-millimetre (4.7 in) guns, four 75-millimetre guns, and five torpedo tubes.

After Italy requisitioned the first four Vifor-class ships — the only four of the planned 12 ever constructed — the Italians completed them as scout cruisers to modified designs. Each ship was 94.7 metres (310 ft 8 in) in length overall, with a beam of 9.5 metres (31 ft 2 in) and a draught of 3.6 metres (11 ft 10 in). The power plant consisted of a pair of Tosi steam turbines and five Thornycroft boilers, generating a designed output of 40,000 shaft horsepower (29,828 kW) powering two shafts, which gave each ship a designed top speed of 34 knots (63 km/h; 39 mph), although the ships actually achieved between 35 and 38 knots (65 and 70 km/h; 40 and 44 mph), depending on the vessel. The ships had a range of 1,700 nautical miles (3,150 km; 1,960 mi) at 15 knots (28 km/h; 17 mph) and 380 nautical miles (700 km; 440 mi) at 34 knots (63 km/h; 39 mph). Each ship had a complement of 146. Armament varied among the ships, and sources disagree on Aquila′s armament when she entered Italian service: According to one source, as completed Aquila had two twin 120-millimetre (4.7 in) guns, two Ansaldo 76-millimetre (3 in) guns, two twin 457-millimetre (18 in) torpedo tubes, two 6.5-millimetre (0.26 in) machine guns, and 38 mines, but other sources claim that she was completed with three 152-millimetre (6 in) and four 76-millimetre (3 in)/40 guns as well as the torpedo tubes, machine guns, and mines.

== Construction, acquisition, and commissioning ==
In 1913, the Royal Romanian Navy ordered Viscol from Cantieri Pattison ("Pattison Shipyard") in Naples, Italy. World War I broke out in late July 1914, and Italy entered the war on the side of the Allies on 23 May 1915. The shipyard had not yet laid down Viscol when Italy requisitioned her on 5 June 1915 for service in the Regia Marina. Renamed Falco and laid down on 19 August 1916, she still was under construction when World War I ended on 11 November 1918. She was launched on 16 August 1919 and was completed and commissioned on 20 January 1920.

== Service history ==
=== Regia Marina ===
After the King of Montenegro, Nicholas I, died in exile in Antibes, France, on 1 March 1921, Falco transported King Victor Emmanuel III from Civitavecchia to Sanremo, Italy, between 4 and 5 March as he traveled to attend Nicholas's funeral.

According to one source, Falco′s armament was modified in 1927, when five 152-millimetre (6 in) guns were removed and replaced with four 120-millimetre (4.7 in) guns.

With the Spanish Civil War underway and the Nationalist faction in Spain in need of destroyers, the Spanish Nationalists entered into negotiations with Fascist Italy for the purchase of destroyers from the Regia Marina. The Nationalists viewed the Italian price as excessive given the age of the destroyers, which were reaching the end of their useful service lives, and Italian Prime Minister Benito Mussolini demanded payment in cash in foreign currency, but after lengthy and difficult negotiations, the Nationalists agreed to buy Falco and Aquila.

The two ships underwent modifications for Spanish service at a shipyard at Castellammare di Stabia, Italy. The Spanish commanding officers and other Spanish officers traveled there to begin the process of taking possession of the ships. Their crews traveled separately, boarding two merchant ships in Spain on 7 October 1937 and arriving at Porto Conte, a bay on the coast of Sardinia, on 9 October to meet the ships. The Italians handed the two ships over to the Spanish crews in Sardinia, one source stating that they departed with their Spanish crews on 10 October 1937, another that the handover did not take place until 11 October 1937, although Falco officially remained on the rolls of the Regia Marina, which reclassified her as a destroyer on 5 September 1938. The transfer finally became official on 6 January 1939, when the Regia Marina struck Falco from the navy list.

=== Spanish Navy ===
==== Spanish Civil War ====
Before Fascist Italy transferred Falco to the Spanish Nationalists, the Nationalists controlled only one non-ex-Italian destroyer, Velasco. Upon taking control of the ship, the Nationalists renamed her Ceuta. To conceal the transfer, Italy did not make it official until January 1939, and the Spanish Nationalists took steps to confuse observers as to her identity: Her modifications at Castellammare di Stabia included the installation of a dummy fourth funnel to give her a greater resemblance to the four-funneled Velasco, and the Nationalists initially referred to her by the name "Velasco-C" rather than as Ceuta. They continued this subterfuge after her delivery, officially referring to her subsequently as "Velasco Ceuta," although she was known in the Nationalist fleet as Ceuta.

Ceuta got underway from Sardinia in October 1937 — on 10 October according to one source, although another states that the Italians did not hand her over until 11 October — bound for Palma de Mallorca on Mallorca in the Balearic Islands in company with Melilla (the former Aquila, also sporting a dummy fourth funnel and referred to by the Spaniards initially as "Velasco M" and after delivery as "Velasco Melilla" to help conceal her sale). Upon arrival, Ceuta joined the Nationalist destroyer flotilla based there, which also included Melilla and Velasco, joined at the end of November 1937 by Huesca (formerly the Italian Alessandro Poerio) and Teruel (formerly the Italian Guglielmo Pepe) when they completed their delivery voyage from Sardinia. The flotilla was assigned to convoy escort duties, support to ground operations, the interdiction of merchant ships of the Spanish Republican faction, and antisubmarine patrols. Capitán de fragata (Frigate Captain) Francisco Regalado Rodríguez, a future admiral and Minister of the Navy, took command of the flotilla on 5 December 1937.

On 4 November 1937, Ceuta left Palma de Mallorca escorting a merchant ship bound for Ceuta on the coast of North Africa. During the night of 5-6 November 1937, Ceuta, the heavy cruiser Canarias, and launches laid several mines off Valencia, returning to Palma de Mallorca on 6 November. On the night of 7–8 November 1937, Ceuta laid another minefield in the vicinity of Castellón de la Plana.

On 7 January 1938, Ceuta got underway from Palma de Mallorca with Canarias and Melilla to rendezvous with the Republican merchant ship SAC-5, whose officers wanted to surrender to the Nationalists, but did not find SAC-5. On 17 January 1938, Ceuta took part in a successful operation to capture the Soviet merchant ship Ziryanin.

On 22 January 1938 Ceuta and Melilla rendezvoused with Canarias and the light cruiser Almirante Cervera at the Columbretes Islands and proceeded to Valencia, where the two destroyers provided antisubmarine protection while the two cruisers conducted a shore bombardment. While patrolling off Catalonia later in January, Ceuta captured the French merchant ship Prado about 4.5 nautical miles (8.3 km; 5.2 mi) off Palamós and took her as a prize, after which Melilla took over the task of guarding Prado. Two French Navy destroyers arrived and demanded that Melilla release Prado. After 15 hours of communication between the French destroyers and Melilla, Prado managed to escape and make port at Republican-controlled Barcelona.

Ceuta, Canarias, Almirante Cervera, the heavy cruiser Baleares, and the gunboat Eduardo Dato got underway from Palma de Mallorca on 31 January 1938 to escort a convoy made up of the tanker Campas, the merchant ships Ferrolano, Mar Negro, and Uribitarte, and the captured American tanker Nantucket Chief to Cádiz. Arriving at Cádiz on 3 February 1938, she had her boilers cleaned at the Arsenal de La Carraca before departing on 27 February 1938 for a voyage to Ceuta and then on to Palma de Mallorca.

The Republican-controlled area of Spain was cut in two at the end of April 1938, and Ceuta and Melilla subsequently began to patrol and escort merchant shipping between Palma de Mallorca and Vinaròs in eastern Spain. They took part in a naval review on 31 May 1938, by which time their dummy fourth funnels had been removed. They later participated in the Nationalist occupation of the Columbretes Islands. On 3 July 1938, they departed Palma de Mallorca and proceeded to Ferrol to have their boilers re-tubed. After completion of the work, they departed Ferrol on 21 August 1938 bound for Cádiz.

In late August 1938 Ceuta and Melilla were among Nationalist ships stationed in the Strait of Gibraltar to prevent the Spanish Republican Navy destroyer José Luis Díez from running the Nationalist blockade of the strait and reaching Cartagena. At 01:15 on 27 August, Ceuta and José Luis Díez sighted each other and opened fire at a range of about 2,000 metres (2,200 yd). Neither destroyer had any success against the other until one of Ceuta′s shells set fire to the gunpowder of one of José Luis Díez′s guns, killing the gun crew. Canarias arrived on the scene and also opened fire on José Luis Díez, seriously damaging her and forcing her to abandon her attempt to reach Cartagena and take refuge at Gibraltar. Ceuta and Melilla refueled at Ceuta on the coast of North Africa, then returned to Palma de Mallorca on 6 September 1938.

At the beginning of October 1938, Ceuta and Melilla were based at Cádiz, and Ceuta′s machinery was inspected at the Arsenal de La Carraca. On 29 December 1938, Ceuta departed Palma de Mallorca with part of the nationalist squadron, proceeding to Motril to oppose a possible Republican amphibious landing there.

Ceuta′s transfer to the Spanish Nationalists became official and overt on 6 January 1939 when the Regia Marina struck her from the Italian navy list. On 9 February 1939, Ceuta and Melilla were among a number of Spanish Nationalist ships that sortied to support an uprising against the Republican government by the garrison of Ciutadella de Menorca on Menorca, and on 12 February Ceuta, Huesca, Melilla, and Teruel entered Mahón.

Ceuta and Melilla took part in a naval review before General Francisco Franco at Salou in northeastern Spain on 22 February 1939. At the beginning of March 1939, Ceuta was under repair at Cádiz. On 6 March, the Spanish Nationalists finally dropped all pretense of referring to her as "Velasco Ceuta," officially naming her Ceuta, although she had been known by that name since her acquisition from Italy. She got underway from Palma de Mallorca on 29 March to patrol off Cartagena. It was here final operation of the Spanish Civil War, which ended on 1 April 1939 in victory for the Nationalists.

==== Post-civil war ====
After the end of the Spanish Civil War, Ceuta was incorporated into the postwar Spanish Navy and based at Mahón with Melilla. The Spanish Navy viewed them as lacking the mechanical reliability and fighting value to serve in combat and assigned them to training duties with the Naval Military Academy. They were overhauled in 1942.

The Spanish struck Ceuta from the navy list in 1948, decommissioned her in 1949, and sold her. She subsequently was scrapped.
