= Italian destroyer Simone Schiaffino =

Italian Rosolino Pilo-class destroyer

History

Kingdom of Italy
- Name: Simone Schiaffino
- Namesake: Simone Schiaffino (1835–1860), Italian patriot
- Builder: Cantieri navali Odero, Sestri Ponente, Kingdom of Italy
- Laid down: 12 September 1913
- Launched: 11 September 1915
- Completed: 7 November 1915
- Commissioned: 7 November 1915
- Reclassified: Torpedo boat 1 October 1929
- Identification: Pennant number SF, SH
- Fate: Sunk 24 April 1941

General characteristics
- Class & type: Rosolino Pilo-class destroyer
- Displacement: 912 tons (max); 770 tons (standard)
- Length: 73 m (240 ft)
- Beam: 7.3 m (24 ft)
- Draught: 2.3 m (7 ft 7 in)
- Installed power: 16,000 brake horsepower (11,931 kW)
- Propulsion: 1 × Tosi steam turbines; 4 × Thornycroft boilers
- Speed: 30 knots (56 km/h; 35 mph)
- Range: 1,200 nmi (2,200 km; 1,400 mi) at 14 knots (26 km/h; 16 mph)
- Complement: 69–79
- Armament: As built: 4 × 1 Cannon 76/40 Model 1916; 2 × 1 76mm/30 AA; 4 × 1 450 mm (17.7 in) torpedo tubes; 10 mines; Post-World War I: 5 × 1 102 mm (4.0 in)/35 guns; 2 × 1 – 40 mm/39 AA; 2 × 1 65-millimetre (2.6 in) machine guns; 4 × 1 450 mm (17.7 in) torpedo tubes

Simone Schiaffino was an Italian Rosolino Pilo-class destroyer. Commissioned into service in the Italian Regia Marina ("Royal Navy") in 1915, she served in World War I, participating in the Adriatic campaign, including the Battle of the Strait of Otranto. Reclassified as a torpedo boat in 1929, she took part in the Mediterranean campaign of World War II until she was sunk in 1941.

== Construction and commissioning ==
Simone Schiaffino was laid down at the Cantieri navali Odero (English: Odero Shipyard) in Sestri Ponente, Italy, on 12 September 1913. She was launched on 11 September 1915 and completed and commissioned on 7 November 1915.

== Service history ==
=== World War I ===
World War I was raging when Simone Schiaffino entered service in November 1915. During the night of 11–12 December 1915 she and the destroyer Ardito escorted the steamships Epiro and Molfetta from Brindisi, Italy, to Durrës (known to the Italians as Durazzo) in the Principality of Albania, where the two steamers delivered supplies for the Serbian Army. After monitoring the unloading of the supplies, the destroyers escorted the steamers back to Brindisi.

In December 1916, Simone Schiaffino underwent repairs at Brindisi.

On the night of 14–15 May 1917, the Battle of the Strait of Otranto, the largest naval action of the Adriatic Campaign of World War I, began when the Austro-Hungarian Navy staged a two-pronged attack against the Otranto Barrage in the Strait of Otranto aimed both at destroying naval drifters — armed fishing boats that patrolled the anti-submarine barrier the barrage formed — and, as a diversionary action, at destroying an Italian convoy bound from Greece to Albania. At 04:50 on 15 May, following news of these attacks, Simone Schiaffino, the Italian destroyer Rosolino Pilo, and the British light cruiser HMS Dartmouth made ready for sea to intervene in the clash. After getting underway, they headed northeast to intercept the Austro-Hungarian ships. Around 08:10, combat began between the Austro-Hungarians and various Allied naval formations sent out to engage them. The Italian scout cruiser Aquila suffered a hit that immobilized her at around 09:05, and the Austro-Hungarian scout cruisers Helgoland, Novara, and Saida closed with her. Dartmouth, the British light cruiser HMS Bristol and the Italian destroyers Antonio Mosto and Giovanni Acerbi placed themselves between Aquila and the Austro-Hungarian ships and opened fire on them at 09:30 at a range of 8,500 metres (9,300 yd). The three Austro-Hungarian ships retreated toward the northwest and the British and Italian ships pursued them at distances of between 4,500 and 10,000 metres (4,900 and 10,900 yd), continuing to fire. All the major warships suffered damage during the battle, but Simone Schiaffino′s formation had to discontinue the action and withdraw at 12:05 when it neared the major Austro-Hungarian naval base at Cattaro, from which the Austro-Hungarian armored cruiser Sankt Georg and destroyers Tátra and Warasdiner had sortied to intervene in the engagement.

An Austro-Hungarian Navy force consisting of Helgoland and the destroyers Balaton, Csepel, Lika, Orjen, Tátra, and Triglav left Cattaro on 18 October 1917 to attack Italian convoys. The Austro-Hungarians found no convoys, so Helgoland and Lika moved within sight of Brindisi to entice Italian ships into chasing them and lure the Italians into an ambush by the Austro-Hungarian submarines U-32 and U-40. At 06:30 on 19 October 1917, Simone Schiaffino, the scout cruisers Alessandro Poerio and Guglielmo Pepe, and the destroyers Insidioso and Pilade Bronzetti got underway from Brindisi to pursue the Austro-Hungarians, and Rosolino Pilo, the destroyer Ippolito Nievo, and the British light cruiser Weymouth diverted from a voyage from Vlorë (known to the Italians as Valona) to Brindisi to join the pursuit. After a long chase which also saw some Italian air attacks on the Austro-Hungarian ships, the Austro-Hungarians escaped and all the Italian ships returned to port without damage.

On 2 October 1918 Simone Schiaffino and Ippolito Nievo were at sea with the battleship Dante Alighieri, and the scout cruisers Alessandro Poerio, Carlo Alberto Racchia, Cesare Rossarol, and Gulglielmo Pepe to provide distant cover for a British and Italian naval bombardment of Durrës. Simone Schiaffino′s force's main mission was to counter any counterattack against the bombardment force by Austro-Hungarian ships based at Cattaro.

By late October 1918, Austria-Hungary had effectively disintegrated, and the Armistice of Villa Giusti, signed on 3 November 1918, went into effect on 4 November 1918 and brought hostilities between Austria-Hungary and the Allies to an end. World War I ended a week later with the armistice between the Allies and the German Empire on 11 November 1918. In November 1918, Simone Schiaffino landed an occupying force on the island of Žirje (known to the Italians as Zuri) off the coast of Dalmatia.

=== Interwar period ===
After World War I, Simone Schiaffino underwent the revision of her armament, which became five 102-millimetre (4 in)/35-caliber guns, two 40-millimetre (1.6 in)/35-caliber guns, and four 450-millimetre (17.7 in) torpedo tubes, and, according to some sources, two 65-millimetre (2.6 in) machine guns. Her full-load displacement rose to 900 tonnes (886 long tons). She was reclassified as a torpedo boat on 1 October 1929.

=== World War II ===
World War II broke out in September 1939 with Nazi Germany's invasion of Poland. Italy joined the war on the side of the Axis powers with its invasion of France on 10 June 1940. At the time, Simone Schiaffino was part of the 5th Torpedo Boat Squadron, along with the torpedo boats Albatros, Giuseppe Cesare Abba, Giuseppe Dezza, and Giuseppe La Farina. During the war, she served on escort, coastal surveillance, transport, and search-and-rescue duties.

On 24 April 1941, Simone Schiaffino was laying signal buoys in the waters of the Mediterranean Sea off Cape Bon, Tunisia, when her stern struck a mine that other Italian ships had just laid. She blew up, sinking by the stern within three minutes. Her 36 survivors were all men who had been in the forward part of the ship at the time of the explosion. Her commanding officer, Capitano di corvetta (Corvette Captain) Riccardo Argentino, was among the missing.
