= Spanish destroyer Velasco =

Spanish destroyer of 1924–1957

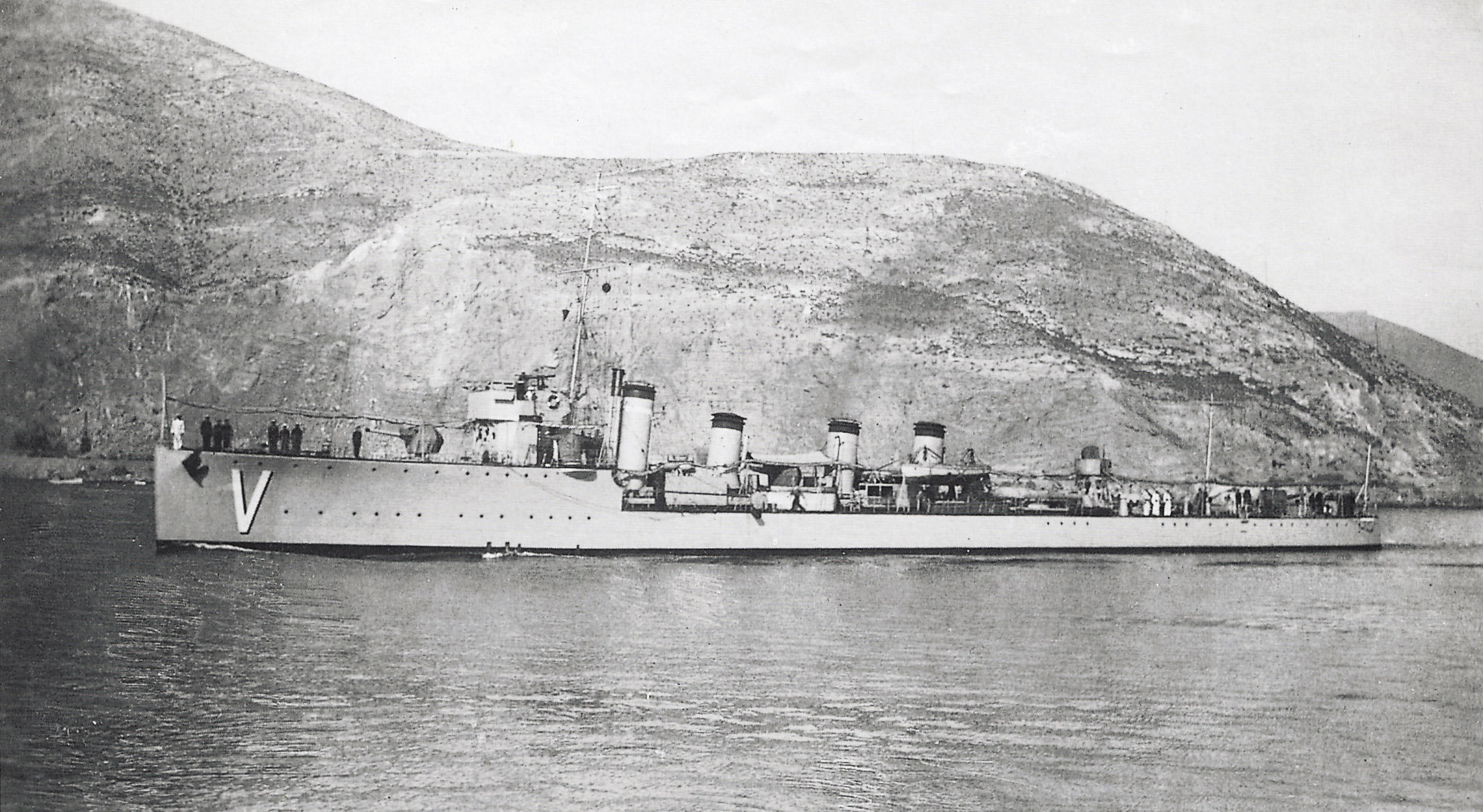
- Velasco, probably in 1926.

History

Spain
- Name: Velasco
- Namesake: Luis Vicente de Velasco (1711–1762), Spanish naval commander
- Operator: Spanish Navy
- Ordered: 1915
- Builder: Sociedad Española de Construcción Naval (SECN), Cartagena Spain
- Laid down: 6 July 1920
- Launched: 16 June 1923
- Commissioned: 27 December 1924
- Decommissioned: 9 April 1957
- Honors and awards: Military Medal
- Fate: Scrapped
- Notes: Allegiance to: Kingdom of Spain 1924–1931; Second Spanish Republic 1931–1936; Nationalist faction 1936–1939; Spanish State 1939–1957

General characteristics
- Class & type: Alsedo-class destroyer
- Displacement: 1,044 long tons (1,061 t) standard; 1,315 long tons (1,336 t) full load
- Length: 83.82 m (275 ft) pp; 86.25 m (283 ft) oa
- Beam: 8.23 m (27 ft)
- Draught: 4.57 m (15 ft)
- Installed power: 4 × Yarrow boilers; 33,000 shp (24,608 kW)
- Propulsion: 2 shafts; 2 geared steam turbines
- Speed: 34 knots (63 km/h; 39 mph)
- Range: 2,500 nmi (4,630 km; 2,877 mi) at 15 knots (28 km/h; 17 mph)
- Complement: 86
- Armament: 3 × 102 mm (4 in)/45 guns; 2 × 47 mm (1.9 in) anti-aircraft guns; 4 × 533 mm (21 in) torpedo tubes (2×2)

Velasco was a Spanish Navy Alsedo-class destroyer in commission from 1924 to 1957. She served in the Rif War in 1925 and fought on the Nationalist side during the Spanish Civil War of 1936–1939. While in commission, she served the Kingdom of Spain from 1924 to 1931, the Second Spanish Republic from 1931 to 1936, the civil war's Nationalist faction from 1936 to 1939, and the Francoist Spanish State from 1936 to 1957.

== Design and characteristics ==
The Alsedo class was designed jointly by the British companies Vickers and John Brown & Co. The Alsedo class was of similar layout to the Hawthorn Leslie variant of the British M-class destroyer.

The ships were 86.25 metres (283 ft) long overall and 83.82 metres (275 ft), with a beam of 8.23 metres (27 ft) and a draught of 4.57 metres (15 ft). Displacement was 1,060 tonnes (1,043 long tons) standard and 1,336 tonnes (1,315 long tons) full load. They were propelled by two geared steam turbines driving two shafts and fed by four Yarrow boilers and had a distinctive four-funneled silhouette. The ships a design speed of 34 knots (63 km/h; 39 mph). They were the first Spanish Navy ships to use only fuel oiil and could carry 276 tonnes (272 long tons) of oil, giving them a range of 1,500 nautical miles (2,800 km; 1,700 mi) at 15 knots (28 km/h; 17 mph). The ships had a crew of 86.

The Alesdo-class ships were armed with three Vickers 4-inch (102 mm) guns manufactured under license in Spain and mounted in three single mounts, with one forward, one aft, and one between the second and third funnels, as well as two anti-aircraft guns, identified by different sources as either 47-millimetre or 2-pounder (40 mm) guns. The anti-aircraft guns later were replaced by four 20 mm autocannons. Four 533-millimetre (21 in) torpedo tubes were mounted in twin banks, and the Alsedo class ships were the first Spanish destroyers to carry torpedoes of that size. The ships were fitted with two depth charge throwers sometime around 1945. A rangefinder was mounted on each ship's bridge.

By the time the Alsedo class entered service in the mid-1920s, destroyer design had advanced and made them obsolete. The Spanish Navy therefore cancelled plans to build three more ships of the class and instead next constructed the more modern and much larger Churruca-class destroyers. Nonetheless, the Alsedo class had active and lengthy careers.

== Construction and commissioning ==
The Spanish Cortes (Parliament) passed a navy law on 17 February 1915 authorizing a large program of construction for the Spanish Navy, including three Alsedo-class destroyers to be built in Spain at the Sociedad Española de Construcción Naval (SECN) shipyard at Cartagena. SECN was part of the same British consortium that included the ship's designers, Vickers and John Brown & Co.

World War I (1914–1918) caused shortages of materials and equipment sourced from the United Kingdom and delayed construction of the Alsedo class, and Velasco′s keel was not laid at the SECN shipyard until 6 July 1920. She was launched on 16 June 1923 and delivered to the Spanish Navy on 27 December 1924.

== Service history ==
=== Kingdom of Spain ===
==== 1924–1927 ====
Velasco and the light cruiser Reina Victoria Eugenia visited Lisbon, Portugal, in January 1925 for the celebration of the fourth centenary of Vasco da Gama. After refueling at Almería, Spain, on 19 March 1925, she proceeded to the coast of Africa. In mid-July 1925 she got underway from Ceuta on the coast of North Africa with her sister ship Alsedo and the light cruisers Blas de Lezo and Méndez Núñez bound for Ferrol on the coast of Galicia. They then continued on to Santander, where King Alfonso XIII received them when they arrived on 27 July 1925. With the two light cruisers and the Royal Family present, Velasco and Alsedo each received a battle ensign acquired by popular subscription in Santander on 3 August 1925. On the afternoon of 19 August 1925, Velasco got underway from Santander to conduct engine tests with Alfonso XIII on board. She anchored in the Bay of La Concha two hours later, then returned to Santander the same day.

Assigned to the Training Squadron along with Alsedo, Blas de Lezo, Méndez Núñez, and the battleships Alfonso XIII and Jaime I, Velasco deployed for service in the Rif War. She took part in the Alhucemas landing at Alhucemas in Spanish Morocco on 9 September 1925. Velasco and Alsedo both suffered damage in a collision with the gunboat Cánovas del Castillo on 12 September. Velasco put into port for repairs which were completed in six days, then returned to the area of operations off Spanish Morocco.

On 25 February 1926, Velasco arrived at Barcelona. All three Alsedo-class destroyers made several cruises during 1926 with students from the Escuela de Guerra Naval (Naval War College) aboard, calling at various ports in Italy in the Mediterranean Sea and Adriatic Sea, as well as Istanbul and other ports. On 20 May 1926, she departed Cartagena with the Training Squadron for exercises in the Mediterranean off Mazarrón with Alfonso XIII, Jaime I, Blas de Lezo, Méndez Núñez, and her sister ship Lazaga. After a new commanding officer reported aboard Velasco on 16 July 1926, she left Mahón on Menorca in the Balearic Islands in company with Alsedo, Lazaga, and the torpedo boats T-5, T-6, T-14, and T-19 on 18 July to conduct maneuvers with naval aviation aircraft off Catalonia.

On 20 June 1927, the three Alsedo-class destroyers got underway from Cartagena to begin a training cruise in the Mediterranean Sea for Naval War College students that lasted almost a month. They conducted tactical exercises with the torpedo boats T-4, T-5, T-15, and T-19, the submarine division based at Mahón, and seaplanes based at Barcelona. After parting company with the torpedo boats, the three destroyers made foreign port visits at Palermo in Sicily, and Ajaccio in Sardinia. They arrived at Patras, Greece, on 27 July 1927, where on 28 July they participated in a ceremony at the site of the 1571 Battle of Lepanto. They next stopped at Piraeus, Greece, and transited the Turkish Straits into the Black Sea to call at Varna, Bulgaria,and Constanta, Romania. They returned through the straits to the Aegean Sea to visit Rhodes in the Italian Dodecanese and called at Haifa in Mandatory Palestine, Crete, Malta, Tunis, Bizerte, and Algiers before returning to Cartagena on 18 September 1927.

In May 1928, the three Alsedo-class destroyers departed Cartagena and called at Ceuta and Cádiz before arriving at Marín, where they conducted gunnery exercises. They visited Portsmouth, England, from 1 to 8 August 1928 for Cowes Week. They also visited other ports in France and the United Kingdom during a training cruise with Naval War College students aboard. During October and November 1928, the three Alsedo-class destroyers were part of a squadron that also included Alfonso XIII, Jaime I, Blas de Lezo, Méndez Núñez, the light cruiser Almirante Cervera, the destroyer Sánchez Barcáiztegui, the submarines Isaac Peral, B-1, B-2, B-3, B-4, B-5, B-6, C-1, and C-2, the torpedo boats T-11, T-13, T-14, T-15, T-18, and T-22, the seaplane carrier Dédalo, and the tug Cíclope that conducted exercises in the Balearic Islands and off Spain's Mediterranean coast. After their conclusion, the squadron made port at Barcelona on 10 and 11 November 1928. The squadron began to disband and depart Barcelona on 20 November 1928.

==== 1929–1931 ====
Blas de Lezo, Méndez Núñez, and the three Alsedo-class destroyers called at Cádiz on 5 March 1929, but soon put back to sea for exercises in the Cíes Islands off Galicia with Alfonso XIII, Jaime I, and Almirante Cervera. The three destroyers anchored at Vigo on the night of 4–5 April 1929 and reached Cádiz on 9 April. As part of a destroyer squadron that also included Sánchez Barcáiztegui, they arrived at Barcelona on 18 May 1929 along with a number of other Spanish Navy ships — including Dédalo, two battleships, five cruisers, nine submarines, two torpedo boats, and other smaller and auxiliary vessels — for the opening of the 1929 Barcelona International Exposition on 19 May. The four destroyers got underway from Barcelona at 16:30 on 25 May 1929 and proceeded to Cartagena.

The four destroyers reached Ferrol to refuel on 19 June 1929, with plans to stay until 22 June before proceeding to Santander. However, the Dornier Do J Wal flying boat of Ramón Franco crashed into the sea during an attempted transatlantic flight, and they were ordered to instead steam to the Azores to join the search for the plane and its crew. They departed at the end of June. The British Royal Navy aircraft carrier HMS Eagle rescued Franco and his crew, and the four destroyers returned to Ferrol during the first week of July 1929. Leaving Ferrol early on the morning of 8 July, they reached Santander on the night of 9 July. After Sánchez Barcáiztegui embarked Naval War College students, the four destroyers put to sea with a squadron of torpedo boats for exercises.

The four destroyers were among Spanish Navy ships that began to arrive at Palma de Mallorca on Mallorca in the Balearic Islands on the afternoon of 26 September 1929 for maneuvers in the waters of the islands. Almirante Cervera, Blas de Lezo, Méndez Núñez, the light cruiser Príncipe Alfonso, and the destroyer Almirante Ferrándiz also took part in the exercises, which concluded in early October 1929. The ships left Palma de Mallorca on 5 October 1929.

While the rest of the ships proceeded to Valencia, Velasco, Alsedo, Lazaga, Sánchez Barcáiztegui, and the destroyer José Luis Díez anchored at Barcelona on the evening of 6 October 1929. King Alfonso XIII arrived at Barcelona the same evening and boarded the motor ship Infanta Isabel to inspect the squadron. After the king's visit, the ships steamed southward to resume the maneuvers. On 16 October, part of the squadron returned to Barcelona for a stay of about ten days to rest the crews, repair damage, and take on supplies. First the destroyer Bustamante led the torpedo boats into the harbor; Velasco, Almirante Ferrándiz, Alsedo, José Luis Díez, Lazaga. and Sánchez Barcáiztegui, and the destroyer Cardaso followed, and then the two battleships, the four cruisers, the submarines, and other smaller vessels entered port. After the Barcelona visit, the destroyer squadron proceeded to Cartagena along with several of the other ships, arriving in late October 1929. After a new commanding officer reported aboard, Velasco got back underway and steamed to Galicia.

During the second half of March 1930, Velasco, Alsedo, Almirante Ferrándiz José Luis Díez, Lázaga, and Sánchez Barcáiztegui departed Cartagena and stopped at Cádiz, where on the morning of 28 March 1930 José Luis Díez was presented with a battle ensign at the Arsenal de La Carraca in San Fernando. They then proceeded to Marín, where two battleships and two cruisers joined them. The ships began gunnery exercises at the Janer training ground in April 1930. Once the gunnery exercises ended, the squadron remained in Galician waters and carried out various maneuvers, most of them in the estuary at Pontevedra. Upon their completion, the squadron returned to Ferrol on 30 June 1930. The destroyer squadron called at El Musel at Gijón for several days in August 1930, them steamed to Santander and Bilbao.

On 27 September 1930, the three Alsedo-class destroyers assembled at Cádiz with Alfonso XIII, Jaime I, Almirante Cervera, Blas de Lezo, Méndez Núñez, Príncipe Alfonso, Reina Victoria Eugenia, Almirante Ferrándiz, José Luis Díez, and Sánchez Barcáiztegui to begin a Mediterranean training cruise. The ships visited Almería and Cartagena before arriving at Alicante in mid-December 1930. Leaving the battleships at Cartagena for boiler repairs, the other ships steamed to Ferrol in January 1931.

=== Second Spanish Republic ===
==== 1931–1932 ====
After King Alonso XIII was deposed, the Second Spanish Republic was proclaimed on 14 April 1931. The three Alsedo-class destroyers got underway from Barcelona with José Luis Díez and Sánchez Barcáiztegui and called at Cádiz from 21 to 30 April. On the evening of 27 May 1931, the battleships España (ex-Alfonso XIII, renamed by the new government) and Jaime I, the light cruisers Almirante Cervera, Miguel de Cervantes, Méndez Núñez, República (ex-Reina Victoria Eugenia, renamed by the new government), and a destroyer squadron composed of Velasco, Almirante Ferrándiz, Lazaga, Lepanto, and Sánchez Barcáiztegui arrived at Ferrol, where they took part along with the seaplne carrier Dédalo and a submarine division in a naval review in the presence of the Minister of the Navy, the captain general of the Maritime Department of the North, and the commander of the squadron.

The destroyer squadron carried out several patrols in the Strait of Gibraltar, making a stop in Cádiz on 3 June 1931 at the end of a voyage from Ceuta. On the evening of 8 June 1931, the three Alsedo-class destroyers left Cadiz in company with Almirante Ferrándiz, José Luis Díez, Lepanto, and Sánchez Barcáiztegui bound for the Mediterranean. All seven destroyers arrived at Palma de Mallorca during the night on 14-15 July 1931 after a voyage from Barcelona. A new commanding officer reported aboard Velasco in August 1931 and was replaced at the beginning of October. On 5 November 1931, Velasco departed Cádiz.

In May 1932, the Undersecretary of the Navy ordered Velasco to get underway from Cartagena, proceed to Valencia, and place herself under the orders of the civil governor there. On 21 May 1932, the Khalifa of Spanish Morocco and his entourage boarded Velasco at Ceuta for transportation to Seville. After visiting several other Spanish cities, the Moroccans departed Cadiz aboard the Civil Guard vessel Xauen on 27 May 1932 and, after a final stop in Málaga, boarded Velasco on 2 June 1932 for transportation to Ceuta.

After rejoining her destroyer squadron, Velasco got underway from Palma de Mallorca in company with José Luis Díez and Lazaga on the morning of 28 July 1932 and set course for Tarragona for maneuvers with a submarine squadron. On 19 August 1932 Velasco arrived at Cádiz for repairs. and after their completion got back underway on 1 September. In October 1932, a new commanding officer took command of Velasco. In November 1932 a squadron of destroyers consisting of Velasco, Alsedo, José Luis Díez, Lazaga, Lepanto, and Sánchez Barcáiztegui, completed a voyage from Mahón, anchoring at Palma de Mallorca on the night of 23 November 1932. On the morning of 24 November, José Luis Díez, and Sánchez Barcáiztegui left for Alicante, and the three Alsedo-class destroyers followed them on the 25 November.

==== 1933–1936 ====
In a reorganization of its forces at the beginning of 1933, the Spanish Navy assigned the three Alsedo-class destroyers to a separate destroyer squadron of their own. In company with José Luis Díez, Lepanto, Sánchez Barcáiztegui, and the destroyers Alcalá Galiano and Churruca, the three Alsedo-class ships completed a voyage from Cartagena to Almería on 29 April 1933. They departed for the coast of Spanish Morocco on 30 April, then got underway from Ceuta on 3 May 1933 to return to Spain. In July 1933, the three Alsedo-class destroyers were among ships that conducted general maneuvers in the waters of the Balearic Islands.

At the beginning of 1934, Velasco became part off the 1st Destroyer Squadron, while Alsedo and Lazaga joined the newly created torpedo training division based at Cartagena. In mid-February 1934, Velasco steamed from Cartagena to Ceuta with the transport Almirante Lobo to join Spanish naval forces in North Africa.

In April 1934, Velasco took part in Spanish Navy maneuvers in the Balearic Islands. Velasco and Alsedo then began repairs, thus missing a naval review which took place on 11 June 1934 at Alcudia in the Balearic Islands in the presence of the President of the Republic Niceto Alcalá Zamora, Minister of the Navy Juan José Rocha García, and other authorities after the maneuvers concluded. Velasco received a new commanding officer while under repair, and yet another on 26 November 1934. After getting underway from Ceuta, she stopped at Vigo from 8 to 9 December 1934 before proceeding to Gijón.

Velasco′s commanding officer died in an automobile accident in May 1935. In mid-May 1935, Velasco, Alsedo, Almirante Cervera, Libertad (the former Principe Alfonso), and Miguel de Cervantes completed gunnery exercises at the Janer training ground and later steamed to the Mediterranean for maneuvers.

=== Spanish Civil War ===
When the Spanish Civil War began with General Francisco Franco′s attempted coup against the Second Spanish Republic on 17 July 1936, Velasco was serving at the Gunnery School in Marín and was moored at Ferrol along with the battleship España and the light cruiser Almirante Cervera. Velasco's crew and some of the coastal artillery units around the harbor sided with Franco's Nationalist faction, while the crews of España and Almirante Cervera opted to support the Republican faction. A gunnery duel broke out pitting Velasco and the coastal fortifications against España and Almirante Cervera. After two days of fighting that resulted in significant damage to the harbor and to Velasco, the crews of España and Almirante Cervera surrendered their ships to the Nationalists.

Velasco was the only Spanish destroyer to side with the Nationalists. After undergoing repairs at Ferrol, she was extremely active, especially in the Cantabrian Sea, bombarding fuel depots in Bilbao, laying mines off various ports, and participating in a Nationalist blockade of Republican-controlled ports. On 17 August 1936, Velasco, España, and Almirante Cervera bombarded San Sebastián. On 3 September 1936 Velasco fought an action with the Republican submarine C-2.

On 19 September 1936, the Nationalist armed tugs Ciricia and Galicia were on blockade duty off Santander when they sighted the Republican submarine B-6 on the surface. They opened gunfire on B-6, which stayed on the surface and returned fire, killing one man and wounding 13 on the tugs. Velasco, which had been patrolling off Gijón, proceeded to the scene and opened fire on B-6, quickly scoring two hits. B-6 hoisted a white flag of surrender and then sank off Cabo de Peñas, probably scuttled by her crew. Velasco and the tugs rescued 39 members of B-6′s 41-man crew.

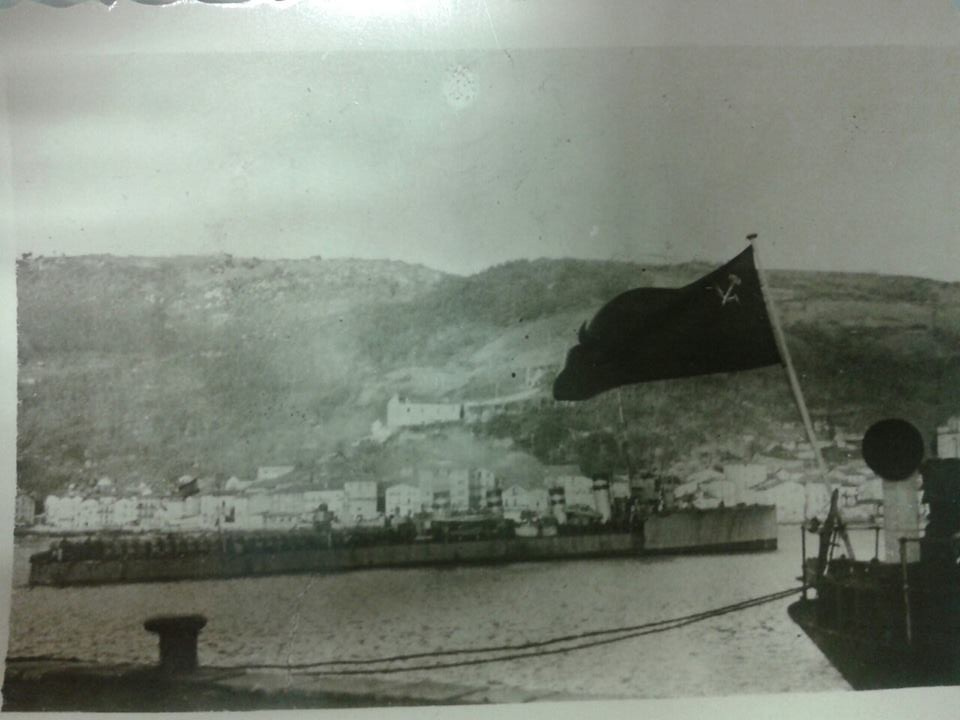
Velasco in port at Pasaia after capturing the Soviet merchant ship Smidovich in 1937.

Velasco attempted to intercept the armed trawlers Bizcaia and Gipuzkoa on 15 November 1936, resulting in the first clash between Nationalist forces and those of the Basque Auxiliary Navy, a section of the Spanish Republican Navy. The trawlers were steaming for Biarritz, France, to escort a cargo ship when Velasco sighted them 40 nautical miles (74 km; 46 mi) off Pasaia. In the ensuing battle, Velasco was hit and withdrew, while Gipuzkoa received some damage on her forecastle, with two men wounded. While Velasco and the auxiliary minelayer Genoveva Fierro were attempting to lay mines off Portugalete on 8 January 1937, Basque Auxiliary Navy vessels intervened and the two Nationalist ships withdrew without laying the minefield after a brief exchange of gunfire. Velasco captured the Soviet merchant ship Smidovich on 10 January 1937.

Velasco was escorting the battleship España when España struck a mine and sank within sight of Santander on 30 April 1937. Velasco entered the minefield and came alongside the sinking battleship, rescuing her entire crew except for three men killed in the explosion of the mine. For their actions, Velasco′s commanding officer received the individual Cross of Naval Merit and her crew received a collective Military Medal.

In October 1937, the Nationalists addressed their shortage of destroyers by purchasing the old scout cruisers Aquila and Falco and the old destroyers Alessandro Poerio and Guglielmo Pepe from Fascist Italy. Aquila and Falco, reclassified as destroyers and renamed Melilla and Ceuta, respectively, by the Nationalists, joined Velasco at Palma de Mallorca in October 1937 and Alessandro Poerio and Guglielmo Pepe, renamed Huesca and Teruel respectively, arrived there at the end of November 1937, creating a five-ship Nationalist destroyer squadron. In an effort to conceal their identities, the Nationalists had a dummy fourth funnel added to Ceuta and Melilla to make them more closely resemble Velasco, referred to them as "Velasco-C" and "Velasco-M" prior to their handover to their Spanish crews, and officially called them "Velasco Ceuta" and "Velasco Melilla" after taking possession of them. By the end of May 1938, each had had her dummy fourth funnel removed, but only on 6 March 1939 did the Nationalists officially name them Ceuta and Melilla.

Meanwhile, Velasco got underway from Palma de Mallorca on 25 January 1938 to patrol the Spanish coast off Valencia with Huesca. On the afternoon of 22 February 1938, Velasco, Melilla, and Teruel escorted the merchant ship Pasajes, which was making a voyage in the Balearic Islands from Formentera to Mallorca. Departing Palma de Mallorca on the morning of 28 February 1938, Velasco and the minelayers Jupiter and Vulcano laid a minefield off Valencia, covered by the Nationalist cruiser division and its escorting destroyers. After completing the operation in the early hours of 1 March, the ships returned to Palma de Mallorca.

On 5 March 1938, Velasco, Huesca, Teruel, and the gunboats Canalejas and Cánovas del Castillo escorted the merchant ships Umbe Mendi and Aizkorri Mendi, which were on a voyage from Italy to Cádiz. At 17:30 that afternoon they rendezvoused south of Ibiza with the Nationalist cruiser division, which had sortied from Palma de Mallorca to take over the escort. The gunboats and destroyers then returned to base, the gunboats heading for Ibiza and the destroyers for Palma de Mallorca. The destroyers and gunboats thus missed the Battle of Cape Palos, in which a Spanish Republican Navy force sank the heavy cruiser Baleares on the night of 5–6 March.

Between June and August 1938, Velasco underwent repairs in Ferrol, then rejoined the Nationalist destroyer squadron on 3 September 1938. She resumed escort, minelaying, shore bombardment, and other operations in the Mediterranean. She returned to Ferrol on 13 October 1938 for further repairs, and played no active part in operations for the remainder of the war. The war ended on 1 April 1939 in a Nationalist victory and the establishment of Francoist Spain, officially known as the Spanish State.

=== Spanish State ===
The three Alsedo-class destroyers were incorporated into the post-civil war Spanish Navy. When British aircraft sank the German submarine U-755 northwest of Mallorca during World War II on 28 May 1943, a Spanish destroyer rescued her nine survivors. Sources disagree on whether the rescuing destroyer was Velasco or Churruca.

The Alsedo-class destroyers were modernized between 1940 and 1943, during which each ship had her bridge raised, a tripod mast with a crow's nest added, and a funnel cap installed on the forward funnel. Each ship's main gun battery also was updated, and three 20 mm anti-aircraft autocannons and two depth charge mortars were added to each ship. After the completion of the work, Velasco returned to service on 11 December 1943.

On the morning of 24 August 1948, Velasco and Lazaga arrived at Panxón, near Vigo, with a brigade of midshipmen from the Naval Military Academy aboard. Alsedo arrived at around 12:00 with the Minister of the Navy, Almirante (Admiral) Francisco Regalado, aboard to celebrate Our Lady of Mount Carmel, the patron saint of the Spanish Navy.

Velasco continued to serve at the Naval Military Academy until she was decommissioned on 9 April 1957.

== Honors and awards ==
- Military Medal for actions on 30 April 1937
