= Viscol =

Viscol is the Romanian word for blizzard.

Viscol also may refer to:

- Viscol, a planned Vifor-class destroyer of the Royal Romanian Navy
- Italian cruiser Falco, a scout cruiser originally ordered as the Royal Romanian Navy destroyer Viscol
