= Italian cruiser Cesare Rossarol =

Italian Alessandro Poerio-class scout cruiser

Coordinates: 44°49′50″N 13°59′15″E

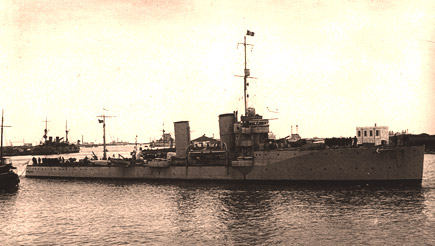

History

Kingdom of Italy
- Name: Cesare Rossarol
- Namesake: Cesare Rossarol (1809–1849), Italian soldier and patriot
- Operator: Regia Marina (Royal Navy)
- Builder: Gio. Ansaldo & C., Sestri Ponente, Kingdom of Italy
- Laid down: 30 June 1913
- Launched: 15 August 1914
- Commissioned: 1 August 1915
- Fate: Sunk 16 November 1918

General characteristics
- Class & type: Alessandro Poerio-class scout cruiser
- Displacement: 891 long tons (normal); 1,270 long tons (full load)
- Length: 85 m (278 ft 10 in)
- Beam: 8 m (26 ft 3 in)
- Draft: 3.11 metres (10 ft 2 in)
- Propulsion: 2 Belluzzo steam turbines, 24,000 hp (17,897 kW), Yarrow Type 3 three-drum water-tube boilers, 2 shafts
- Speed: 32 knots (59 km/h; 37 mph)
- Range: 2,400 nmi (4,400 km; 2,800 mi) at 13 knots (24 km/h; 15 mph)
- Crew: 109
- Armament: Planned: 4 x 102/35 mm (4 in) guns; 8 x 450-millimetre (17.7 in) torpedo tubes; As built: 6 x 102/35 mm (4 in) guns; 4 x 450-millimetre (17.7 in) torpedo tubes; 42 x mines; Added 1917: 2 x 40/39 mm guns; 1918: 6 x 102/45 mm (4 in) guns; 2 x 40/39 mm guns; 4 x 450-millimetre (17.7 in) torpedo tubes; 42 x mines

Cesare Rossarol was an Italian scout cruiser. (Note: Cesare Rossarol′s sister ships, Alessandro Poerio and Guglielmo Pepe, were reclassified as destroyers in 1921 due to their light displacement.) Commissioned into service in the Italian Regia Marina (Royal Navy) in 1915, she served during World War I, participating in the Adriatic campaign until she was sunk in 1918.

Like her sister ships, Alessandro Poerio and Guglielmo Pepe, she was named after a famous Neapolitan light cavalryman who helped defend Venice from attacks by the Imperial Austrian Army during the revolutions in 1848.

== Design ==
Cesare Rossarol was an Italian "light scout cruiser" (Italian:esploratore leggero) measuring 85 m (278 ft 10 in) long and 8 m (26 ft 3 in) in beam. She had Yarrow Type 3 three-drum water-tube boilers with water pipes, two groups of Belluzzo steam turbines rated at 24,000 hp (17,897 kW), and two three-blade propellers. Her fuel capacity of 325 tons gave her a range of 2,400 nautical miles (4,400 km; 2,800 mi) at 13 knots (24 km/h; 15 mph). She could launch torpedoes while maintaining a constant speed of over 30 knots (56 km/h; 35 mph). Her normal displacement was 891 tons and her full-load displacement was 1,270 tons.

Plans originally called for Cesare Rossarol to have an armament of four 102/35 mm guns and eight 450-millimetre (17.7 in) torpedo tubes, but was revised during construction, and she entered service with six 102/35-millimetre guns and four 450-millimetre (17.7 in) torpedo tubes, and a minelaying capacity of 42 mines, making her armament equivalent to that of an Austro-Hungarian Novara-class scout cruiser. Two 40/39 mm guns were installed aboard her in 1917. In 1918, she was refitted with 102/45 mm guns.

== Construction and commissioning ==
Cesare Rossarol was laid down by Gio. Ansaldo & C. at Sestri Ponente, Italy, on 30 June 1913. She was launched on 15 August 1914 and commissioned on 1 August 1915.

== Service history ==
=== World War I ===
==== 1915–1916 ====
World War I was raging when Cesare Rossarol entered service in August 1915. After initial shakedown and training activities at La Spezia, Italy, she was based at Taranto, Italy, where in November 1915 she became part of the 2nd Scouting Group of the 5th Naval Division, with an operating area in the southern Adriatic Sea. On 30 December 1915 she became part of the 2nd Scouting Group of the 4th Naval Division along with her sister ships Alessandro Poerio and Guglielmo Pepe, based at Venice.

On 3 May 1916, Cesare Rossarol and Guglielmo Pepe got underway with the destroyers Francesco Nullo and Giuseppe Missori to provide distant support to the destroyers Fuciliere and Zeffiro as they laid a minefield in the Adriatic Sea off Šibenik (known to the Italians as Sebenico) on the coast of Austria-Hungary. Off Punta Maestra, the Italian formation sighted four Austro-Hungarian Navy Huszár-class destroyers and six Austro-Hungarian torpedo boats and steered to attack them. While the Austro-Hungarian ships headed toward the Austro-Hungarian naval base at Pola with the Italians in pursuit, three Austro-Hungarian seaplanes attacked the Italian ships. The Italians repelled the attack, but at 15:50, after an Austro-Hungarian cruiser and two additional Austro-Hungarian torpedo boats departed Pola to support the Austro-Hungarian ships, the Italian force gave up the chase and withdrew. Meanwhile, Fuciliere and Zeffiro succeeded in laying the minefield during the night of 3–4 May 1916.

Cesare Rossarol and Guglielmo Pepe laid a minefield off Ancona, Italy, on 11 May 1916.

Escorted as far as the Austro-Hungarian defensive barrage by Cesare Rossarol and Guglielmo Pepe and supported by the destroyers Alpino and Fuciliere and the coastal torpedo boats 40 PN and 46 OS, the destroyer Zeffiro, under the command of Capitano di fregata (Frigate Captain) Costanzo Ciano and with Lieutenant Nazario Sauro, an Italian irredentist, aboard as pilot, entered the port of Poreč on the western side of Istria, a peninsula on Austria-Hungary's coast, at dawn on 12 June 1916. A group of men from Zeffiro, including Sauro, captured a gendarme who showed them the location of an aircraft hangar. In the meantime, Alpino, Fuciliere, 40 PN, and 46 OS had joined Zeffiro, and at 04:50 they began a bombardment which lasted about 20 minutes. The hangar suffered damage from hits by 76-millimetre (3 in) shells from the Italian ships. Austro-Hungarian coastal artillery batteries returned fire, and then 10 Austro-Hungarian seaplanes attacked the Italian ships. Allied aircraft came to the defense of the Italians, resulting in a dogfight in which Austro-Hungarian seaplanes collided with two Italian and one French aircraft. All the Italian ships returned to base, although they suffered damage and a number of casualties, including four men killed in action.

==== 1917–1918 ====
In June 1917, Cesare Rossarol was transferred to Brindisi, Italy, and incorporated into the Fourth Scouting Group of the Fourth Naval Division, and returned to operations in the southern Adriatic Sea. On the night of 25–26 August 1917 Cesare Rossarol and Guglielmo Pepe escorted the coastal torpedo boats 34 PN, with the motor torpedo boat MAS 6 in tow, and 35 PN, towing the motor torpedo boat MAS 91, to a point where the two MAS boats dropped their towlines. The MAS boats then raided the harbor at Durrës (known to the Italians as Durazzo) on the coast of the Principality of Albania in an attempt to attack steamers there. The MAS boats found no steamers in the harbor and withdrew without results.

On 30 December 1917, Cesare Rossarol opened gunfire on a surfaced U-boat, forcing the submarine to dive and withdraw.

Cesare Rossarol, Guglielmo Pepe, and the destroyers Indomito and Ippolito Nievo were assigned to support a raid against Durrës on the night of 10–11 February 1918 by the motor torpedo boats MAS 9 and MAS 20, towed by the coastal torpedo boats 37 PN and 38 PN. Bad weather forced the cancellation of the raid.

On 10 March 1918, the destroyer Antonio Mosto, with the motor torpedo boat MAS 100 in tow, and Ippolito Nievo, towing MAS 99, set out for a raid on Portorož (known to the Italians as Portorose) on the coast of Austria-Hungary, supported by Cesare Rossarol, Alessandro Poerio, the scout cruisers Augusto Riboty and Carlo Mirabello, the destroyers Giacinto Carini and Pilade Bronzetti, and a French Navy destroyer squadron led by the destroyer Casque. Antonio Mosto, Ippolito Nievo, MAS 99, and MAS 100 reached the vicinity of Portorož, but then had to postpone the operation due to bad weather. The ships attempted the raid again on 16 March, but adverse weather again forced its postponement. They made a third attempt on 8 April 1918, but after aerial reconnaissance ascertained that the port of Portorož was empty, the Italians again called off the operation.

At 23:54 on 14 May 1918, Ippolito Nievo, with MAS 99 in tow, and Pilade Bronzetti, towing MAS 100, dropped their tow cables about 15 nautical miles (28 km; 17 mi) from Bar (known to the Italians as Antivari) on the coast of Montenegro. The two MAS boats, after an unsuccessful attack on Bar, reunited with the two destroyers. Cesare Rossarol and Guglielmo Pepe supported the operation, which concluded with the return of the ships to Brindisi at 09:00 on 15 May.

On 16 September 1918, Cesare Rossarol transported troops in both directions between Brindisi and Vlorë (known to the Italians as Valona), Albania. On 2 October 1918 Cesare Rossarol, Alessandro Poerio, Gulglielmo Pepe, and Ippolito Nievo were at sea with the battleship Dante Alighieri, the scout cruiser Carlo Alberto Racchia, and the destroyer Simone Schiaffino to provide distant cover for a British and Italian naval bombardment of Durrës. The main mission of Cesare Rossarol′s force was to counter any counterattack against the bombardment force by Austro-Hungarian ships based at Cattaro.

By late October 1918, Austria-Hungary had effectively disintegrated, and the Armistice of Villa Giusti, signed on 3 November 1918, went into effect on 4 November 1918 and brought hostilities between Austria-Hungary and the Allies to an end. With the signing of that armistice, Cesare Rossarol was reassigned to the upper Adriatic Sea, based at the former Austro-Hungarian Navy base at Pola to conduct antisubmarine patrols. On 10 November 1918, Cesare Rossarol and Guglielmo Pepe transported Italian infantry units to Pola to reinforce Italian units already occupying the city. World War I ended the next day, with an armistice between the Allies and the German Empire on 11 November 1918.

=== Loss ===
On 16 November 1918, 12 days after the end of the conflict with Austria-Hungary, Cesare Rossarol left Pola at 11:40 under the command of Capitano di vascello (Ship-of-the-Line Captain) Ludovico de Filippi to transport an officer of the State of Slovenes, Croats and Serbs to Fiume, where he was to try to convince Serbian-Croatian irregular formations not to oppose the Italian occupation of the city. Departing Pola just before 12:00, she proceeded to Cape Kamenjak, then set course for Fiume. At 12:45 that day, shortly after rounding Patera Point on Istria, while most of the crew were having lunch, the ship hit a mine on her port side amidships near the local dynamo, aft of the bridge. She broke in two. The stern section, about 30 metres (98 ft) long, rose out of the sea to a vertical position and sank almost immediately, while the bow section, carried forward by inertia, continued for a few hundred meters (yards), then also sank a short time after the stern. The sinking occurred in about two minutes.

During the Adriatic Campaign of World War I, the Austro-Hungarian Navy had laid extensive minefields off Istria. Following the Armistice of Villa Giusti, the Austro-Hungarian naval command made no real attempt to communicate the position or extent of the many minefields, as a result of which a number of ships hit mines in the area after the war, including Cesare Rossarol. It was impossible to determine whether she had hit a loose mine or whether the ship's pilot, Giovanni Pizzini, considered by the Regia Marina to be one of its best pilots, who was at Cesare Rossarol′s helm, either had mistakenly guided the ship into a minefield or had unwittingly guided her into an unreported one.

The sinking claimed 100 lives, including those of de Filippi, who disappeared at sea after giving up his life jacket to a sailor who did not have one; the ship's executive officer, Tenente di vascello (Ship-of-the-Line Lieutenant) Ludovico Scaccia Alberti; five other officers; and 93 petty officers and sailors. The coastal torpedo boat 16 OS and two MAS motor torpedo boats rushed to the scene, and 15 other vessels also arrived to assist, but rescuers could save only 34 survivors.

== Awards and commemoration ==
On 17 May 1919, de Filippi was awarded the Silver Medal of Military Valor posthumously. In September 1919 a monument to the memory of the 100 men lost aboard Cesare Rossarol was erected at Munat Point, not far from the site of the sinking.

The Regia Marina acquired the former Imperial German Navy destroyer B97 as a war reparation in 1920. Renamed Cesare Rossarol in honor of the sunken ship, she entered service in the Regia Marina in 1924.

== Wreck ==
The wreck of Cesare Rossarol lies at a depth of 49 metres (161 ft) less than 1 nautical mile (1.9 km; 1.2 mi) off Ližnjan (known to the Italians as Lisignano). The bow section, approximately 30 metres (98 ft) long, lies upside down on the seabed, approximately 330 metres (360 yd) away from the stern section, which is upright.
