= Italian destroyer Pilade Bronzetti =

Italian Rosolino Pilo-class destroyer

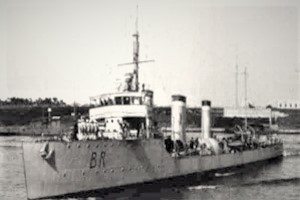

History

Kingdom of Italy
- Name: Pilade Bronzetti
- Namesake: Pilade Bronzetti (1832–1860), Italian patriot
- Builder: Cantieri navali Odero, Sestri Ponente, Kingdom of Italy
- Laid down: 12 September 1913
- Launched: 26 October 1915
- Commissioned: 1 January 1916
- Stricken: January 1921
- Reinstated: January 1921
- Identification: Pennant number BR
- Renamed: Giuseppe Dezza 16 January 1921
- Namesake: Giuseppe Dezza (1830–1898), Italian general, politician, and patriot
- Reclassified: Torpedo boat 1 October 1929
- Identification: Pennant number DZ
- Fate: Captured by Nazi Germany 11 September 1943

Nazi Germany
- Name: TA35
- Acquired: 11 September 1943
- Commissioned: 9 June 1944
- Fate: Sunk 17 August 1944

General characteristics
- Class & type: Rosolino Pilo-class destroyer
- Displacement: 912 tons (max); 770 tons (standard)
- Length: 73 m (240 ft)
- Beam: 7.3 m (24 ft)
- Draught: 2.3 m (7 ft 7 in)
- Installed power: 16,000 brake horsepower (11,931 kW)
- Propulsion: 1 × Tosi steam turbines; 4 × Thornycroft boilers
- Speed: 30 knots (56 km/h; 35 mph)
- Range: 1,200 nmi (2,200 km; 1,400 mi) at 14 knots (26 km/h; 16 mph)
- Complement: 69–79
- Armament: As built: 4 × 1 Cannon 76/40 Model 1916; 2 × 1 76mm/30 AA; 4 × 1 450 mm (17.7 in) torpedo tubes; 10 mines; 1925: 5 × 1 102 mm (4.0 in)/35 guns; 2 × 1 – 40 mm/39 AA; 2 × 1 65-millimetre (2.6 in) machine guns; 4 × 1 450 mm (17.7 in) torpedo tubes

Pilade Bronzetti was an Italian Rosolino Pilo-class destroyer. Commissioned into service in the Italian Regia Marina ("Royal Navy") in 1916, she served in World War I, participating in the Adriatic campaign. Her crew supported Gabriele D'Annunzio′s actions in Fiume in 1920, and as a consequence she was renamed Giuseppe Dezza in 1921. Reclassified as a torpedo boat in 1929, she took part in the Mediterranean campaign of World War II until the Italian armistice with the Allies, prompting Nazi Germany to capture her. Subsequently operating in the Kriegsmarine as TA35, she participated in the Adriatic Campaign of World War II until she was sunk in 1944.

== Construction and commissioning ==
Pilade Bronzetti was laid down at the Cantieri navali Odero (English: Odero Shipyard) in Sestri Ponente, Italy, on 12 September 1913. She was launched on 26 October 1915 and completed and commissioned on 1 January 1916.

== Service history ==
=== World War I ===
==== 1916–1917 ====
World War I was raging when Pilade Bronzetti entered service on New Year's Day 1916. Based at Brindisi, Italy, she was tasked with conducting reconnaissance in the southern Adriatic Sea and protection of the Otranto Barrage, an antisubmarine barrage in the Strait of Otranto, also operating occasionally in the waters of the Kingdom of Greece.

Under the command of Capitano di corvetta (Corvette Captain) Grixoni, Pilade Bronzetti was returning from Albania to Brindisi on 6 February 1916 in company with the British light cruiser HMS Liverpool and other ships when they sighted the Austro-Hungarian Navy destroyer SMS Wildfang. Wildfang was the vanguard of a force composed of the scout cruiser Helgoland and six torpedo boats tasked with attacking Allied merchant ships departing Durrës (known to the Italians as Durazzo), Albania. After a brief exchange of gunfire, Wildfang retreated towards the Austro-Hungarian-occupied coast, bringing the action to an end.

On 13 June 1916, Pilade Bronzetti and the destroyers Antonio Mosto, Audace, and Rosolino Pilo provided escort and support to the motor torpedo boats MAS 5 and MAS 7, which, after the coastal torpedo boats 35 PN and 37 PN towed them to a starting position, penetrated the harbor at Austro-Hungarian-occupied Shëngjin (known to the Italians as San Giovanni di Medua) in Albania. The incursion was unsuccessful: MAS 5 and MAS 7 found no ships moored in the harbor, then withdrew under Austro-Hungarian artillery fire without suffering any damage.

An Austro-Hungarian Navy force consisting of the scout cruiser Helgoland and the destroyers Balaton, Csepel, Lika, Orjen, Tatra, and Triglav left Cattaro on 18 October 1917 to attack Italian convoys. The Austro-Hungarians found no convoys, so Helgoland and Lika moved to within sight of Brindisi to entice Italian ships into chasing them and lure the Italians into an ambush by the Austro-Hungarian submarines U-32 and U-40. At 06:30 on 19 October 1917, Pilade Bronzetti, the scout cruisers Alessandro Poerio and Guglielmo Pepe, and the destroyers Insidioso and Simone Schiaffino got underway from Brindisi to pursue the Austro-Hungarians, and the destroyers Ippolito Nievo and Rosolino Pilo and the British light cruiser HMS Weymouth diverted from a voyage from Vlorë (known to the Italians as Valona), Albania, to Brindisi to join the pursuit. After a long chase which also saw some Italian air attacks on the Austro-Hungarian ships, the Austro-Hungarians escaped and all the Italian ships returned to port without damage.

==== 1918 ====
On 10 March 1918, the destroyers Antonio Mosto, with the motor torpedo boat MAS 100 in tow, and Ippolito Nievo, towing MAS 99, set out for a raid on Portorož (known to the Italians as Portorose) on the coast of Austria-Hungary, with Pilade Bronzetti, the scout cruisers Alessandro Poerio, Augusto Riboty, Carlo Mirabello, and Cesare Rossarol, the destroyer Giacinto Carini, and a French Navy destroyer squadron led by the destroyer Casque in support. Antonio Mosto, Ippolito Nievo, MAS 99, and MAS 100 reached the vicinity of Portorož, but then had to postpone the operation due to bad weather. The ships attempted the raid again on 16 March, but adverse weather again forced its postponement. They made a third attempt on 8 April 1918, but after aerial reconnaissance ascertained that the port of Portorož was empty, the Italians again called off the operation.

At 18:10 on 12 May 1918, Pilade Bronzetti, with MAS 99 in tow, and Ippolito Nievo, towing MAS 100, got underway from Brindisi for a raid against the roadstead at Durrës. At 23:00, MAS 99 and MAS 100 dropped their tow cables about 10 nautical miles (19 km; 12 mi) from Durrës, then entered the harbor. At 02:30 on 13 May MAS 99 torpedoed the steamer Bregenz, which sank a few minutes later with the loss of 234 men. The attack triggered a violent Austro-Hungarian reaction, but all the ships returned to Brindisi unscathed.

At 23:54 on 14 May 1918, Pilade Bronzetti, with MAS 100 in tow, and Ippolito Nievo, towing MAS 99, dropped their tow cables about 15 nautical miles (28 km; 17 mi) from Bar (known to the Italians as Antivari) on the coast of Montenegro. The two MAS boats, after an unsuccessful attack on Bar, reunited with the two destroyers. The scout cruisers Cesare Rossarol and Guglielmo Pepe supported the operation, which concluded with the return of the ships to Brindisi at 09:00 on 15 May.

On 2 June 1918, Pilade Bronzetti and Antonio Mosto bombarded the island of Lastovo (known to the Italians as Lagosta) in the Adriatic Sea. The bombardment took place in coordination with a bombing attack on the island by Italian planes based at Cagnano Varano, Italy.

By late October 1918, Austria-Hungary had effectively disintegrated, and the Armistice of Villa Giusti, signed on 3 November 1918, went into effect on 4 November 1918 and brought hostilities between Austria-Hungary and the Allies to an end. World War I ended a week later with the armistice between the Allies and the German Empire on 11 November 1918.

=== Interwar period ===
After World War I, Pilade Bronzetti performed escort and shipping surveillance and inspection duties in various areas of the Mediterranean Sea. In 1919, she operated in the Adriatic Sea off Albania and Montenegro, then was based in the upper Adriatic to perform surveillance duties.

Before Italy entered World War I, it had made a pact with the Allies, the Treaty of London of 1915, in which it was promised all of the Austrian Littoral, but not the city of Fiume (known in Croatian as Rijeka). After the war, at the Paris Peace Conference in 1919, this delineation of territory was confirmed, with Fiume remaining outside of Italy's borders and amalgamated into the Kingdom of the Serbs, Croats and Slovenes (which in 1929 would be renamed the Kingdom of Yugoslavia). Opposing this outcome, the poet and Italian nationalist Gabriele D'Annunzio led a force of about 2,600 so-called "legionaries" to Fiume and seized the city in September 1919 in what became known as the Impresa di Fiume ("Fiume endeavor" or "Fiume enterprise"). D'Annunzio declared Fiume to be the Italian Regency of Carnaro in September 1920. Relations between Italy and D'Annunzio's government continued to deteriorate, and after Italy signed the Treaty of Rapallo with the Kingdom of the Serbs, Croats, and Slovenes in November 1920, making Fiume an independent state as the Free State of Fiume rather than incorporating it into Italy, D'Annunzio declared war on Italy.

On the night of 6–7 December 1920, Pilade Bronzetti′s crew mutinied while she was steaming in the Kvarner Gulf. Surprising the ship's officers while they were having breakfast, the crew took control of Pilade Bronzetti and proceeded to Fiume, where they placed the ship under D'Annunzio′s orders. D'Annunzio welcomed them with a solemn speech in which he called them "young saviors of the honor of the Italian navy." The officers, who had asked that D'Annunzio and the mutineers free the ship to return to base, were ignored and kept on board.

Italy launched a full-scale invasion of Fiume on 24 December 1920, beginning what became known as the Bloody Christmas. The Bloody Christmas fighting ended on 29 December 1920 in D'Annunzio's defeat and the establishment of the Free State of Fiume. With the Fiume affair at an end, Pilade Bronzetti surrendered to Italian forces and returned to Regia Marina control. In January 1921, she moved to Pola and temporarily was stricken from the naval register. Quickly reinstated as a ship of the Regia Marina, she was renamed Giuseppe Dezza on 16 January 1921.

In October 1923, Giuseppe Dezza entered the Taranto Naval Arsenal for extensive modifications which included the revision of her armament. She emerged from the shipyard in 1925 with five 102-millimetre (4 in)/35-caliber guns, two 40-millimetre (1.6 in)/35-caliber guns, and four 450-millimetre (17.7 in) torpedo tubes, and, according to some sources, two 65-millimetre (2.6 in) machine guns. Her full-load displacement rose to 900 tonnes (886 long tons).

Returning to service, Giuseppe Dezza first deployed to Naples and then temporarily was placed in reserve. In April 1926, under the command of Capitano di corvetta (Corvette Captain) Emilio Brenta, she was assigned to the Torpedo Boat Division. During 1926, she transferred the governor of Italian Tripolitania, Emilio de Bono, from Tripoli, the capital of Tripolitania, to Naples. In 1927, she became the divisional flagship at Taranto. She was reclassified as a torpedo boat on 1 October 1929 and assigned to the Taranto Command School.

=== World War II ===
==== Italian service, 1940–1943 ====
World War II broke out in September 1939 with Nazi Germany's invasion of Poland. Italy joined the war on the side of the Axis powers with its invasion of France on 10 June 1940. At the time, Giuseppe Dezza was based at Messina, Sicily, performing target-towing duties as part of the 5th Torpedo Boat Squadron, which also included the torpedo boats Albatros, Giuseppe Cesare Abba, Giuseppe La Farina, and Simone Schiaffino. She soon deployed to Cagliari on the southern coast of Sardinia.

On 9 January 1941, Giuseppe Dezza unsuccessfully counterattacked the British submarine HMS Pandora after Pandora sank troopships in the Tyrrhenian Sea off Capo Carbonara on the southeastern coast of Sardinia. From 12 to 13 March 1941, Giuseppe Dezza, the heavy cruisers Bolzano, Trento, and Trieste, and the destroyers Aviere, Carabiniere, and Corazziere provided distant support to a convoy made up of the troopships Conte Rosso, Marco Polo, and Victoria and the destroyers Camicia Nera, Folgore, and Geniere as it made a voyage from Naples to Tripoli.

In June 1941, Giuseppe Dezza returned to Messina as her base. From Messina, she carried out escort and patrol duties in the southern Tyrrhenian Sea and along the coast of Sicily, but also made trips as far as Tripoli and Benghazi on the coast of Libya. On 19 August 1941, she joined the destroyers Alfredo Oriani, Nicoloso da Recco, Ugolino Vivaldi, and Vincenzo Gioberti in escorting the troopships Esperia, Marco Polo, Neptunia, and Oceania on a voyage to Tripoli. On 20 August, the troopships avoided an attack by the British submarine HMS Unbeaten, which Vincenzo Gioberti and the destroyer Antonio da Noli unsuccessfully attempted to counterattack, but the British submarine HMS Unique then torpedoed Esperia, which sank at 33°03′N 013°03′E with the loss of 31 lives. Giuseppe Dezza took part in rescue efforts, which succeeded in saving 1,139 men.

During 1942, Giuseppe Dezza was painted in camouflage colors. On 16 December 1942, she took under tow the destroyer Carabiniere, whose bow had been blown off by a submarine's torpedo.

In January 1943, Giuseppe Dezza received a commendation from the chief of staff of the Regia Marina following a convoy escort mission. During the same month, she provided assistance to the destroyer Maestrale, seriously damaged by a mine.

Allied forces invaded Sicily in July 1943, culminating in the fall of Messina to them in August 1943, forcing Giuseppe Dezza to abandon her base. She redeployed to Brindisi and was assigned to the 3rd Torpedo Boat Group in the Ionian and Lower Adriatic Maritime Military Department along with Giuseppe Cesare Abba and the torpedo boats Enrico Cosenz, Francesco Stocco, Giuseppe Missori, and Giuseppe Sirtori. She subsequently moved to Fiume, where she entered a shipyard for repairs.

On 8 September 1943, the Kingdom of Italy announced an armistice with the Allies and switched sides in the war, prompting Nazi Germany to begin Operation Achse, the disarmament by force of the Italian armed forces and the occupation of those portions of Italy not yet under Allied control. Immobilized at the shipyard, Giuseppe Dezza was unable to get underway to avoid capture, so her crew sabotaged her on 11 September 1943. Her crew then joined crewmen from other Italian ships and about 1,000 Italian Royal Army soldiers aboard the motor ship Leopardi, which departed Fiume in an attempt to reach an Allied-controlled port. Two German motor torpedo boats intercepted Leopardi, however, and forced her to proceed to German-controlled Venice.

Giuseppe Dezza′s commanding officer was interned at a prisoner-of-war camp at Przemysl, Poland, where the Germans held thousands of Italian military personnel after the armistice of 8 September 1943. He had smuggled Giuseppe Dezza′s flag into the camp with him. In a clandestine ceremony the Italians held at the camp, hundreds of cavalry sottotenenti (sublieutenants) of the Pinerolo School, captured before they could take their oath at the end of the course, swore loyalty to King Victor Emmanuel III of Italy, kissing a corner of the flag while it was in the hands of a Collonello (Colonel) de Michelis.

During World War II, Giuseppe Dezza had conducted 174 convoy escort missions and 27 anti-submarine patrols.

==== German service, 1943–1944 ====
The Germans captured Giuseppe Dezza, and she was repaired at the Cantieri Riuniti dell'Adriatico of Trieste. With repairs complete, the ship entered service in the German Kriegsmarine on 9 June 1944 as TA35. TA35 became part of the 2nd Naval Escort Flotilla based at Fiume and performed escort duty along the coast of Dalmatia. At 04:58 on 17 August 1944, TA35 struck a mine while steaming in the Fasana Channel on the Pola–Rovinj route. She broke in two and sank quickly at 41°53′N 013°47′E with the loss of 71 members of her crew.

==== Wreck ====
Some sources erroneously claim that TA35 was refloated, sunk again at Trieste during an air attack while undergoing repairs, and then scrapped. However, her wreck remains in place, lying on a muddy seabed in 35 metres (115 ft) of water. It is broken in two. The bow section lies on its side about 200 metres (220 yd) from the stern section, which is upright.
