= Navy NCO School =

Spanish naval training institution

Coordinates: 36°28′39″N 6°11′34″W

Emblem of the Spanish Navy NCO School

The Navy NCO School (Spanish: Escuela de Suboficiales de la Armada) is a military institution for the training of non-commissioned officers of the Spanish Navy (cabo mayor (master corporal), sergeant, first sergeant, brigade (master sergeants), second lieutenant and subofficial mayor (warrant officer)). It is located in San Fernando in the Province of Cádiz, Andalusia, Spain. It was established during the reign of Carlos III between 1775 and 1789.

The San Fernando Naval Museum is within the school.

== History ==
The Escuela de Suboficiales de la Armada was built during the reign of Carlos III, between 1775 and 1789. The present school was built on the site of the former Naval Military School. The construction project included a church (Pantheon of Illustrious Sailors), the Captain General's House, the Quartermaster's Office, the Treasury, the Accountant's Office, the Marine Guards Barracks and Academy (currently in Marín, Pontevedra), the Brigades Barracks, the Pilots Academy, the Hospital and two more Barracks for the troops of the Marine Battalions. From 1992 to 2015, it also housed the Naval Museum of the area.
