= Cannone da 152/45 =

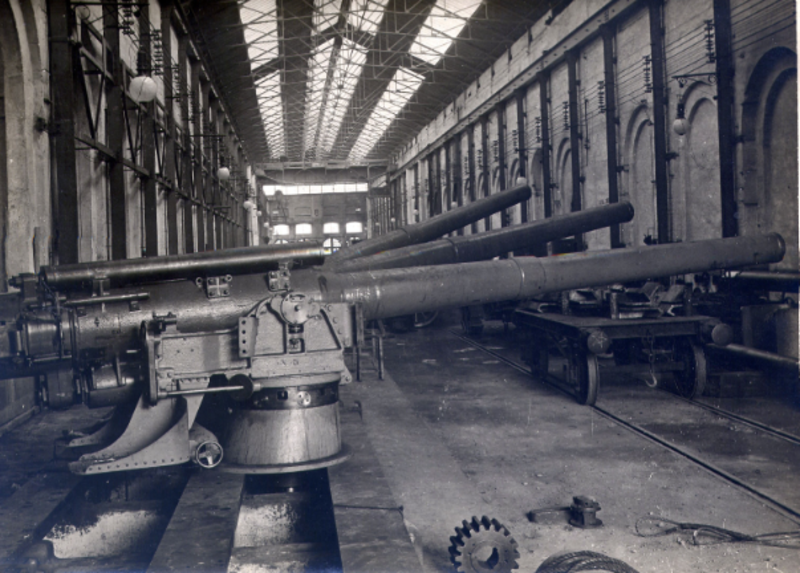
- Cannone da 152/45's on pedestal mounts at the Ansaldo factory.
- Type: Naval gun Coastal artillery Siege gun
- Place of origin: Kingdom of Italy

Service history
- In service: 1917–1945
- Used by: Kingdom of Italy
- Wars: World War I World War II

Production history
- Manufacturer: Ansaldo

Specifications
- Mass: Naval gun: 7.1 t (7 long tons); Siege gun: 16.67 t (16.41 long tons)
- Barrel length: 7.138 m (23 ft 5 in) L/46.7
- Shell: Separate loading bagged charge and projectile
- Shell weight: 47 kg (104 lb)
- Caliber: 152.4 mm (6 in)
- Breech: Welin breech block
- Recoil: Hydro-spring
- Carriage: Box trail
- Elevation: -5° to +45°
- Traverse: Casemate: 60° Siege gun: 10°
- Rate of fire: 1 rpm
- Muzzle velocity: 830 m/s (2,700 ft/s)
- Maximum firing range: 19.4 km (12 mi)

The Cannone da 152/45 modello 1911 was an Italian naval gun built by the Ansaldo company. It formed the secondary armament of the two Andrea Doria-class dreadnought battleships built during World War I. A number of guns were also converted to siege artillery and coastal artillery roles and served during both world wars.

== Variants ==
- Coastal artillery - An unknown number of guns were mounted on shielded pedestal mounts as coastal artillery during both world wars.
- Naval artillery - The secondary armament of this class of two ships consisted of sixteen 45-calibre 152-millimetre (6 in) guns, mounted in single casemates along the sides of the hull underneath the main guns. These guns could traverse 60 degrees, depress to −5 degrees and had a maximum elevation of +20 degrees. The gun mounts had a reputation of being wet in heavy seas and when the ships were modernized these gun positions were removed and the surplus guns were redeployed.
- Siege artillery - This version consisted of mounting surplus barrels on a large box trail carriage to address the Italian Army's need for siege artillery and long-range counter-battery work. The carriage had a large open section in the middle that allowed the gun to reach high elevation angles. In order to deploy the guns, a large pit had to be dug to allow the breech to recoil and also allowed the gun crew to service the breech. At the front of the pit, there was a platform to anchor the gun, allowing for limited traverse. 53 were in Italian service in 1939 mostly in Northern Italy. The German designation for the gun was the 15.2 cm K 411(i).

== Photo Gallery ==
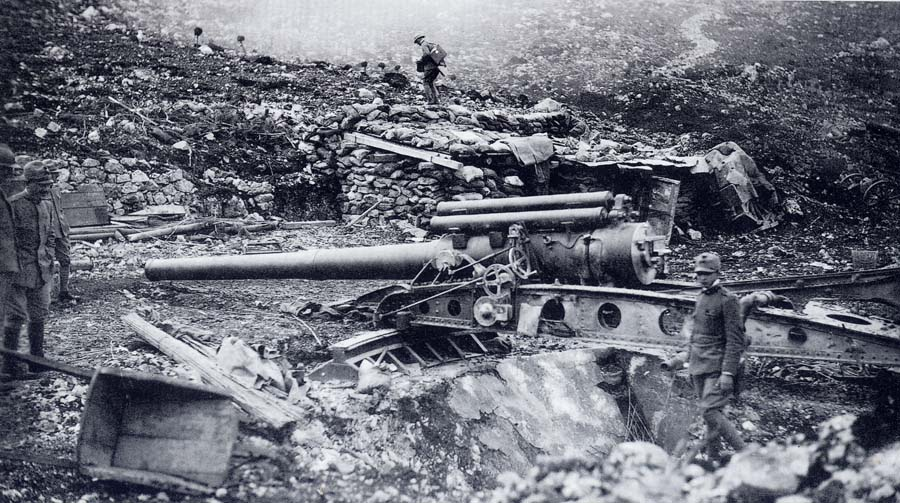
A 152/45 at Monte Sabatino in 1917.

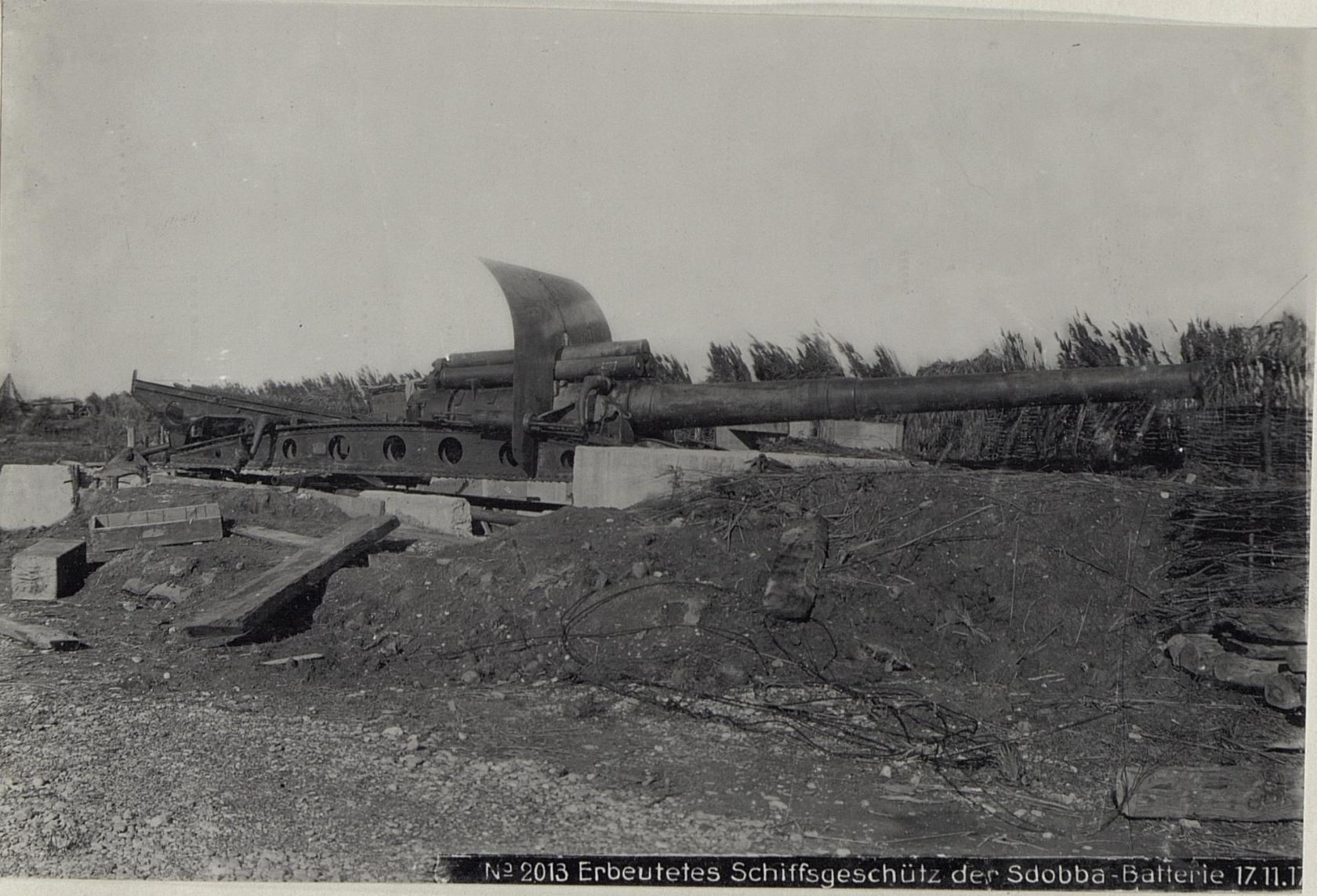
A 152/45 captured by Austro-Hungarian forces.

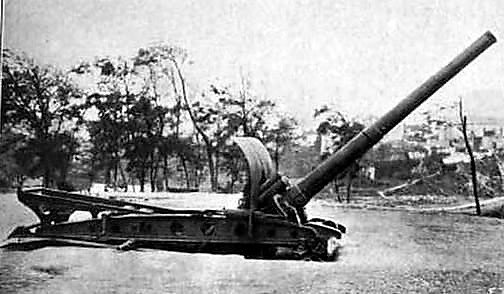
A 152/45 on its firing platform
