= Francisco Regalado =

Minister of the Navy of Spain
- In office 20 July 1945 – 19 July 1951
- Prime Minister: Francisco Franco
- Preceded by: Salvador Moreno Fernández
- Succeeded by: Salvador Moreno Fernández

Personal details
- Born: Francisco Regalado Rodríguez; 1 May 1891 Ferrol, Spain
- Died: 30 December 1958 (aged 67) Madrid, Spain

Military service
- Allegiance: Spain
- Branch/service: Spanish Navy
- Years of service: 1908–1957
- Rank: Almirante (Admiral)
- Commands: B-1; Isaac Peral; Almirante Cervera; Spanish fleet
- Battles/wars: Rif War; Spanish Civil War

Francisco Regalado Rodríguez (1 May 1891 – 30 December 1958) was a Spanish admiral who served as Minister of the Navy of Spain between 1945 and 1951, during the Francoist dictatorship. He supported the Nationalist faction during the Spanish Civil War (1936–1939), and after its victory in the war served as minister of the navy.

== Biography ==
Regalado was born in Ferrol on 1 May 1891. His family had a strong naval and military tradition: His great-grandfather was a Spanish Navy alférez de navío (ship-of-the-line ensign, the higher of the Spanish Navy's two ensign ranks), his father, Francisco Regalado Vossen, was an honorary contraalmirante (counter admiral), and his father's brother, Dimas Regalado Vossen, also was contraalmirante; and all of his siblings served as officers in either the Spanish Army or Spanish Navy. received his primary education at the Sagrado Corazón de Jesús (Sacred Heart of Jesus School) in Ferrol. In 1903, at the age of 12, he entered the Naval Preparatory School in Ferrol, where Francisco Franco Bahamonde was a fellow student. After completing the five-year course of study there, he became a guardia marina (midshipman) in 1908 and a promotion to alférez de navío (ship-of-the-line ensign) in 1911. He continued his studies at the Montefiore Institute in Liège, Belgium, training as an engineer there as well as in France, and Italy.

Regalado quickly gained professional prestige in the navy. He specialized in submarine warfare, in which he became a recognized authority in Europe. He served as an instructor at the Spanish Navy's submarine school and as an instructor ion radio telecommunications at the Naval Aeronautical School.

Regalado was promoted to capitán de corbeta (corvette captain) in 1916. In 1922, as commanding officer of the submarine B-1, he participated in the evacuation of the civilian population of Peñón de Vélez de la Gomera on the coast of North Africa during the Rif War (1921–1926). From 1928 to 1930, he was the first commanding officer of the submarine Isaac Peral. He laster served as inspector of merchant ships in Bilbao. He was promoted to capitán de fragata (frigate captain) in 1935 and became head of the communications service of the navy general staff.

When the Spanish Civil War began on 17 July 1936, Regalado joined the Nationalist faction, which opposed the Second Spanish Republic. During the war, he held the positions of chief of staff of the Nationalist fleet, deputy chief of staff of the Nationalist naval forces at the headquarters of Generale (General) Francisco Franco, and commander of the Nationalist destroyer flotilla. At the end of the war — which culminated in a Nationalist victory and the establishment of Francoist Spain — in 1939, hde was the naval attaché at the Spanish Embassy in Rome in Fascist Italy.

By 1941, Regalado was the commanding officer of the light cruiser Almirante Cervera. Soon afterward he became chief of operations of the navy general staff, and he received a promotion to contraalmirante (rear admiral) in 1943. When Franco formed his third government on 20 July 1945, Regalado became minister of the navy. He remained in that position until the end of the third government 19 July 1951. He believed that the foreign use of aircraft carriers during World War II demonstrated that the failure of Spain's 1939 Naval Plan — revised in 1942 and 1943 — to include them was a major shortcoming. To address this he ordered the navy to acquire the Italian heavy cruiser Trieste — which had been sunk in 1943, then refloated in 1950 — for conversion into an aircraft carrier. After Regalado left office, Spain purchased Trieste's hull in 1952, but the conversion project was cancelled due to rising costs, and the Spanish Navy did not acquire an aircraft carrier until it commissioned Dédalo in 1967.

In 1951, Regalado became commander of the Spanish fleet. In 1952 he was promoted to almirante (admiral) and became captain general of the Maritime Department of Ferrol de Caudillo, as Ferrol had been renamed in 1938. He retired from active service in 1957.

After Regalado left the Ministry of the Navy in 1951, Franco appointed him as a member of the Cortes Españolas. Regalado also served as president of the board of directors of Empresa Nacional Elcano. He died in Madrid on 30 December 1958.

== Criminal charges ==
Regalado was one of 35 high-ranking officials of the Franco regime indicted by the Audiencia Nacional (National Court) in the case brought by Baltasar Garzón, for crimes of illegal detention and crimes against humanity committed during the Spanish Civil War and in the early years of the regime. He was not prosecuted, based on legal confirmation of his death.

Preceded by Salvador Moreno Fernández	Minister of the Navy; 20 July 1945 – 19 July 1951	Succeeded by Salvador Moreno Fernández
