= Italian destroyer Ardente =

Italian Ardito-class destroyer

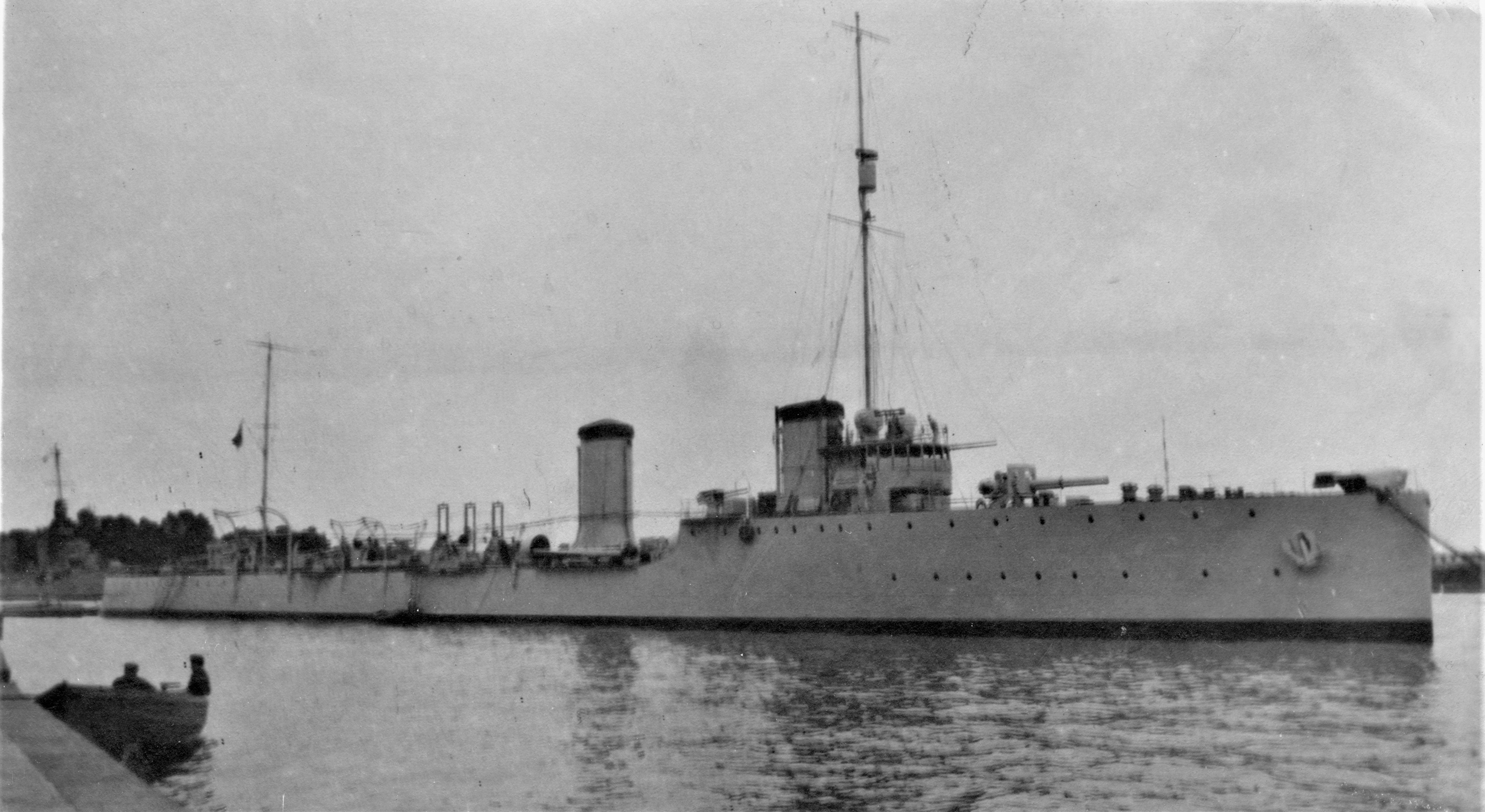
- Ardente in 1916.

History

Kingdom of Italy
- Name: Ardente
- Namesake: "Ardent"
- Builder: Cantiere navale fratelli Orlando, Livorno, Kingdom of Italy
- Laid down: 1912
- Launched: 15 December 1912
- Commissioned: 1913
- Reclassified: Torpedo boat 1 October 1929
- Stricken: 11 March 1937
- Identification: Pennant number AE
- Fate: Discarded 1937

General characteristics
- Class & type: Ardito-class destroyer
- Displacement: Full load: 790 long tons (800 t)
- Length: 73 m (239 ft 6 in) loa
- Beam: 7.3 m (23 ft 11 in)
- Draft: 2.4 m (7 ft 10 in)
- Installed power: 4 × water-tube boilers; 16,000 shaft horsepower (11,931 kW)
- Propulsion: 2 × steam turbines; 2 × screw propellers
- Speed: 30 knots (56 km/h; 35 mph)
- Range: 1,200 nmi (2,200 km; 1,400 mi) at 14 knots (26 km/h; 16 mph)
- Complement: 5 × officers; 65 × enlisted men
- Armament: 1 × 120 mm (4.7 in) gun; 4 × 76 mm (3 in) guns; 2 × 450 mm (17.7 in) torpedo tubes

Ardente (English: "Ardent") was the second and final unit of the Italian Ardito-class destroyers. Commissioned into service in the Italian Regia Marina (Royal Navy) in 1913, she served in World War I, playing an active role in the Adriatic campaign. Reclassified as a torpedo boat in 1929, she was discarded in 1937.

== Design ==
The ships of the Ardito class were 74.8 m (245 ft 5 in) long at the waterline and 73 m (239 ft 6 in) long overall, with a beam of 7.3 m (23 ft 11 in) and a draft of 2.4 m (7 ft 10 in). They displaced 695 long tons (706 t) standard and up to 790 long tons (800 t) at full load. They had a crew of 4 officers and 65 enlisted men. The ships were powered by two Parsons steam turbines, with steam provided by four Thornycroft water-tube boilers. The engines were rated to produce 16,000 shaft horsepower (11,931 kW) for a top speed of 30 knots (56 km/h; 35 mph), though in service they reached as high as 33.4 knots (61.9 km/h; 38.4 mph) from 15,733 shp (11,732 kW). At a more economical speed of 14 knots (26 km/h; 16 mph), the ships could cruise for 1,200 nautical miles (2,200 km; 1,400 mi).

The ship carried an armament that consisted of a single 120 mm (4.7 in) gun and four 76 mm (3 in) guns, along with two 450 mm (17.7 in) torpedo tubes. The 120 mm gun was placed on the forecastle and two of the 76 mm guns were mounted abreast the funnels, with the remaining pair at the stern. The torpedo tubes were in single mounts, both on the centerline.

== Construction and commissioning ==
Ardente was laid down at the Cantiere navale fratelli Orlando (English: Orlandi Brothers Shipyard) in Leghorn (Livorno), Italy, in 1912. She was launched on 15 December 1912 and commissioned in 1913.

== Service history ==
=== World War I ===
==== 1915 ====
World War I broke out in 1914, and the Kingdom of Italy entered the war on the side of the Allies with its declaration of war on Austria-Hungary on 23 May 1915. At the time, Ardente and the destroyers Animoso, Ardito, Audace, and Francesco Nullo made up the 1st Destroyer Squadron, based at Brindisi, with the squadron under the command of Capitano di corvetta (Corvette Captain) Caccia. On 9 June 1915, Ardente, Animoso, Ardito, Audace, the destroyers Indomito, Intrepido, Impetuoso, Irrequieto, and Insidioso and the protected cruiser Quarto escorted the armored cruisers Giuseppe Garibaldi and Vettor Pisani as they participated in the bombardment of the lighthouses at the Cape of Rodon and Shëngjin (known to the Italians as San Giovanni di Medua) on the coast of the Principality of Albania.

On 11 July 1915 Ardente, Animoso, Ardito, and Audace escorted Quarto to the Palagruža (known to the Italians as Pelagosa) archipelago in the Adriatic Sea, where they landed the vanguard of an occupation force. The auxiliary cruiser Città di Palermo, the protected cruiser Marsala, the destroyer Strale, and the torpedo boats Airone, Arpia, Astore, Calliope, Cassiopea, and Clio also took part in the operation, which went smoothly: Two Austro-Hungarian signalmen, who first hid from and then surrendered to the Italians, made up the archipelago's entire garrison.

At 04:00 on 17 July 1915 Ardente, together with Giuseppe Garibaldi, Vettor Pisani, Ardito, Strale, Airone, Arpia, Astore, Calliope, Clio, the armored cruiser Varese, and the torpedo boats Alcione, Centauro, and Cigno, took part in a bombardment of the Ragusa–Cattaro railway. The Italian force broke off the bombardment when Vettor Pisani sighted an Austro-Hungarian submarine at 04:25. The Italians had begun their return voyage to Brindisi when the Austro-Hungarian submarine U-4 attacked the formation at 04:40 and torpedoed Giuseppe Garibaldi, which sank within minutes.

==== 1916 ====
On 3 August 1916 Ardente, commanded by an officer named Tagliavia, got underway together with the destroyer Giuseppe Cesare Abba to support an attack by nine Italian airplanes against Durrës (known to the Italians as Durazzo) in Albania, but during their voyage to the Albanian coast the two ships were diverted to Molfetta, Italy, which was under bombardment by an Austro-Hungarian force composed of the protected cruiser Aspern, the destroyers Warasdiner and Wildfang, and the torpedo boats TB 80 and TB 85. Ardente suffered a mechanical breakdown and had to fall back and join a squadron led by the French Navy destroyer Commandant Bory, which was coming up to reinforce the Italian ships. Giuseppe Cesare Abba continued alone, and although the French destroyers eventually joined her, the resulting clash was inconclusive, and the Allied ships discontinued the chase after pursuing the Austro-Hungarians to a point only 16 nautical miles (30 km; 18 mi) from the Austro-Hungarian Navy base at Cattaro.

At 21:00 on 11 December 1916 Ardente and Indomito got underway from Vlorë (known to the Italians as Valona) in Albania to escort the battleship Regina Margherita to Italy, but shortly after departure Regina Margherita hit two mines less than 2 nautical miles (3.7 km; 2.3 mi) from Vlorë, capsized, and sank in just seven minutes with the loss of 674 lives. Only 275 members of her crew were saved.

==== 1917 ====
On 11 May 1917 Ardente got underway from Venice with Animoso, Ardito, Giuseppe Cesare Abba, and a new destroyer Audace to intercept an Austro-Hungarian Navy force consisting of the destroyer Csikos and the torpedo boats 78 T, 93 T, and 96 T. They sighted the Austro-Hungarian ships at 15:30 at a range of about 10,000 meters (10,900 yd) but were unable to engage the Austro-Hungarian ships before they escaped behind the protection of a minefield near the major Austro-Hungarian Navy base at Pola, and after approaching Pola the Italian ships gave up the chase and returned to Venice.

On the night of 13–14 August 1917 Ardente left Venice with Animoso, Audace, Giuseppe Cesare Abba, and the destroyers Carabiniere, Francesco Stocco, Giovanni Acerbi, Giuseppe Sirtori, Pontiere, and Vincenzo Giordano Orsini to intercept an Austro-Hungarian force made up of the destroyers Dinara, Reka, Sharfschutze, Streiter, and Velebit and six torpedo boats which had supported an air raid by 32 aircraft against the fortress of Venice which had struck San Giovanni e Paolo Hospital, killing 14 people and injuring around 30 others. Only Vincenzo Giordano Orsini managed to make brief and fleeting contact with the Austro-Hungarian ships before they escaped.

On 29 September 1917 Ardente put to sea with Ardito and Audace and a second formation made up of Francesco Stocco, Giovanni Acerbi, Giuseppe Cesare Abba, Vincenzo Giordano Orsini, and the scout cruiser Sparviero to support a bombing raid by 10 Italian airplanes against Pola. They encountered an Austro-Hungarian force composed of Streiter, Velebit, the destroyers Huszár and Turul, and four torpedo boats on a similar mission against an Italian airbase. The Italians opened fire just before midnight at a range of 3,000 metres (3,300 yards), but received the worst of the initial exchange as the Austro-Hungarians concentrated their fire on the leading ship, Sparviero. Sparviero was hit five times, but only three men were wounded, and one Italian destroyer was hit. As the Austro-Hungarians retreated towards the shelter of their minefields, the Italians crippled Velebit and set her on fire. Another Austro-Hungarian destroyer took her in tow and both sides returned to port after an inconclusive exchange of fire inside the minefields later that night during the predawn hours of 30 September.

On 16 November 1917 Ardente, Animoso, Audace, Francesco Stocco, Giovanni Acerbi, Giuseppe Cesare Abba, and Vincenzo Giordano Orsini got underway to respond to a bombardment carried out by the Austro-Hungarian coastal defense ships Wien and Budapest against Italian artillery batteries and other coastal defenses at Cortellazzo, near the mouth of the Piave River. The destroyers supported an attack by the Italian motor torpedo boats MAS 13 and MAS 15 which, together with attacks by Italian aircraft and the Italian submarines F11 and F13, disrupted the bombardment and forced the two Austro-Hungarian ships to withdraw.

On 18 November 1917, Ardente, Animoso, Audace, and Giuseppe Cesare Abba bombarded the Austro-Hungarian lines along the Italian front between Caorle and Revedoli.

On 28 November 1917, an Austro-Hungarian Navy force consisting of Dinara, Reka,Streiter, the destroyers Dikla, Huszár, and Triglav, and the torpedo boats TB 78, TB 79, TB 86, and TB 90 attacked the Italian coast. While Dikla, Huszar, Streiter and the torpedo boats unsuccessfully attacked first Porto Corsini and then Rimini, Dinara, Reka, and Triglav bombarded a railway near the mouth of the Metauro, damaging a train, the railway tracks, and telegraph lines. The Austro-Hungarian ships then reunited and headed back to the main Austro-Hungarian naval base at Pola. Ardente, Animoso, Ardito, Audace, Francesco Stocco, Giovanni Acerbi, Giuseppe Cesare Abba, Sparviero, Giuseppe Sirtori, Vincenzo Giordano Orsini, and the destroyer Aquila departed Venice and, together with reconnaissance seaplanes, pursued the Austro-Hungarian formation. The seaplanes attacked the Austro-Hungarians without success, and the Italian ships had to give up the chase when they did not sight the Austro-Hungarians until they neared Cape Promontore on the southern coast of Istria, as continuing beyond it would bring them too close to Pola.

==== 1918 ====
On 10 February 1918 Ardente, Aquila, Ardito, Francesco Stocco, Giovanni Acerbi, and Giuseppe Sirtori — and, according to some sources, the motor torpedo boat MAS 18 — steamed to Porto Levante, now a part of Porto Viro, in case they were needed to support an incursion into the harbor at Bakar (known to the Italians as Buccari) by MAS motor torpedo boats. Sources disagree on whether they remained in port or put to sea to operate in distant support, but in any event, their intervention was unnecessary. The motor torpedo boats carried out their raid, which became known in Italy as the Beffa di Buccari ("Bakar mockery").

By late October 1918, Austria-Hungary had effectively disintegrated, and the Armistice of Villa Giusti, signed on 3 November 1918, went into effect on 4 November 1918 and brought hostilities between Austria-Hungary and the Allies to an end. World War I ended a week later with the armistice between Allies and the German Empire on 11 November 1918.

=== Post-World War I ===
After the end of World War I, Ardente′s armament was revised, giving her five 102 mm (4 in)/35-caliber guns, a single 40 mm (1.6 in)/35-caliber gun, and a pair of 6.5 mm (0.26 in) machine guns. The work was completed by 1920.

Ardente was reclassified as a torpedo boat on 1 October 1929. She was struck from the naval register on 11 March 1937 and thereafter discarded and scrapped.
