= Italian destroyer Vincenzo Giordano Orsini =

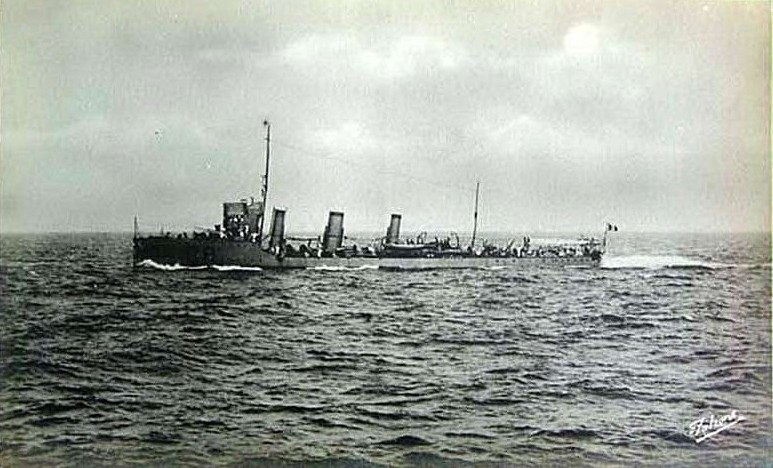
- Vincenzo Giordano Orsini underway

History

Kingdom of Italy
- Name: Vincenzo Giordano Orsini
- Namesake: Vincenzo Giordano Orsini (1817–1889), Italian patriot and politician
- Builder: Cantieri navali Odero, Sestri Ponente, Italy
- Laid down: 2 February 1916
- Launched: 23 April 1917
- Completed: 12 May 1917
- Commissioned: 12 May 1917
- Fate: Scuttled 8 April 1941

General characteristics
- Class & type: Giuseppe Sirtori-class destroyer
- Displacement: 709 t (698 long tons) (normal); 914 t (900 long tons) (deep load)
- Length: 73.54 m (241 ft 3 in) (o/a)
- Beam: 7.34 m (24 ft 1 in)
- Draft: 2.7 m (8 ft 10 in) (mean)
- Installed power: 4 × Thornycroft boilers; 15,500 shp (11,600 kW)
- Propulsion: 2 shafts; 2 steam turbines
- Speed: 30 knots (56 km/h; 35 mph)
- Range: 1,700 nmi (3,100 km; 2,000 mi) at 12 knots (22 km/h; 14 mph)
- Complement: 98 officers and men
- Armament: 6 × single 102 mm (4 in) guns; 2 × single 40 mm (1.6 in) AA guns; 2 × twin 450 mm (17.7 in) torpedo tubes; 10 × mines

Vincenzo Giordano Orsini was the third of four Giuseppe Sirtori-class destroyers built for the Italian Regia Marina (Royal Navy) during World War I. Commissioned in 1917, she participated in the later stages of that war's Adriatic campaign. Reclassified as a torpedo boat in 1929, she was serving in the Red Sea Flotilla when Italy entered World War II in June 1940. She was scuttled in 1941 to prevent her capture by Allied forces during the East African campaign.

== Design ==
The ships of the Giuseppe Sirtori class were 72.5 m (237 ft 10 in) long at the waterline and 73.54 m (241 ft 3 in) long overall, with a beam of 7.34 m (24 ft 1 in) and a mean draft of 2.7 m (8 ft 10 in). They displaced 709 t (698 long tons) standard and up to 914 t (900 long tons) at full load. They had a crew of 98 officers and enlisted men. The ships were powered by two steam turbines, with steam provided by four Thornycroft water-tube boilers. The engines were rated to produce 15,500 shaft horsepower (11,600 kW) for a top speed of 30 knots (56 km/h; 35 mph), though in service they reached as high as 33.6 knots (62.2 km/h; 38.7 mph) from around 17,000 shp (13,000 kW). At a more economical speed of 15 knots (28 km/h; 17 mph), the ships could cruise for 1,700 nautical miles (3,100 km; 2,000 mi).

Vincenzo Giordano Orsini was armed with a main battery of six 102 mm (4 in) guns. Her light armament consisted of a pair of 40 mm (1.6 in) anti-aircraft guns and two 6.5 mm (0.26 in) machine guns. She was also equipped with four 450 mm (17.7 in) torpedo tubes in two twin launchers, one on each side of the ship. The ship also carried ten naval mines.

== Construction and commissioning ==
Vincenzo Giordano Orsini was laid down at the Cantieri navali Odero shipyard in Sestri Ponente, Italy, on 2 February 1916. She was on launched on 23 April 1917 and completed and commissioned on 12 May 1917.

== Service history ==
=== World War I ===
==== 1917 ====
After entering service, Vincenzo Giordano Orsini operated in the Adriatic Sea in the Adriatic campaign as flagship of her destroyer squadron. Her first commanding officer was Capitano di fregata (Frigate Captain) Ernesto Burzagli — a future admiral and Senator of the Kingdom of Italy — who also served as commander of the squadron.

During the night of 13–14 August 1917, Vincenzo Giordano Orsini got underway from Venice, Italy, with the rest of her squadron (the destroyers Francesco Stocco, Giovanni Acerbi, and Giuseppe Sirtori), another destroyer squadron composed of Animoso, Ardente, Audace, and Giuseppe Cesare Abba, and a destroyer section composed of Carabiniere and Pontiere to intercept an Austro-Hungarian Navy force made up of the destroyers Dinara, Reka, Scharfschütze, Streiter, and Velebit and six torpedo boats which had supported an air raid by 32 aircraft against Venice which hit the San Giovanni e Paolo Hospital, killing 14 people and injuring approximately 30 others. Only Vincenzo Giordano Orsini made brief and fleeting contact with the Austro-Hungarian ships. She had to discontinue her pursuit when she approached Austro-Hungarian minefields and lost sight of the Austro-Hungarian formation, which then returned to its base without difficulty.

On 29 September 1917, Vincenzo Giordano Orsini, now under the command of Capitano di fregata (Frigate Captain) Vaccaneo, who also served as the commander of her destroyer squadron, put to sea with the rest of her squadron (Franceco Stocco, Giovanni Acerbi, and Giuseppe Cesare Abba), the scout cruiser Sparviero (flagship of Prince Ferdinando of Udine, who had overall command of the formation), and a destroyer squadron made up of Ardente, Ardito, and Audace to support a bombing attack by 10 Italian Royal Army Caproni aircraft against Pola in Austria-Hungary. At about the same time, Austro-Hungarian seaplanes attacked Ferrara, Italy, setting fire to the airship M.8. An Austro-Hungarian force made up of the destroyers Huszár, Streiter, Turul , and Velebit and the torpedo boats TB 90F, TB 94F, and TB 98M, as well as a fourth torpedo boat, according to some sources, was at sea to support the attack. Alerted to the Austro-Hungarian air attack, the Italian ships headed for the waters off Rovinj (known to the Italians as Rovigno) on the assumption that the Austro-Hungarian ships would pass through the area while returning to base. At 22:03, Sparviero sighted unknown ships about 2 nautical miles (3.7 km; 2.3 mi) away. They were, in fact, the Austro-Hungarians, and at 22:05 the opposing groups opened fire on one another. The gunfire became intense when the opposing ships closed to a range of 2,000 metres (2,200 yards). According to Italian sources, the clash ended at 22:30, when the two formations lost contact because they were on divergent courses and, although the two sides regained contact at 22:45, they lost it completely after a few minutes without achieving significant results. According to Austro-Hungarian sources, Sparviero was hit and suffered serious damage, after which she left the battle line, prompting the other Italian ships to cease fire and withdraw as well, while on the Austro-Hungarian side Velebit was damaged by an Italian projectile which disabled her steering system and started a fire. Streiter took Velebit in tow, but then two Italian destroyers arrived on the scene and closed to a range of 1,000 metres (1,100 yards), before moving away after Streiter, Velebit and the torpedo boats opened fire on them.

After its defeat in the Battle of Caporetto on the Italian front, the Italian Royal Army retreated 150 kilometres (93 mi) to the Piave River in November 1917. During the retreat, Vincenzo Giordano Orsini and the rest of her squadron had orders to slow advancing Austro-Hungarian Army troops by bombarding them in enfilade and to oppose Austro-Hungarian ships attempting to bombard Italian forces. At 10:35 on 16 November 1917, the Austro-Hungarian coastal defense ships Budapest and Wien arrived off Cortellazzo, Italy, and began a bombardment targeting the Italian lines and artillery batteries. Italian coastal artillery immediately returned fire, and Italian aircraft made three attacks on the Austro-Hungarian ships. Budapest and Wien ceased fire at 11:52 to avoid interfering with Austro-Hungarian troops on the front and withdrew, but they returned to the area at 13:30 and resumed fire at 13:35. Vincenzo Giordano Orsini departed Venice with Animoso, Ardente, Audace, Francesco Stocco, Giovanni Acerbi, and Giuseppe Cesare Abba to counter the bombardment. Operating west of the area under bombardment, the destroyers supported an attack by the Italian motor torpedo boats MAS 13 and MAS 15 which, combined with the three air attacks and attacks by the Italian submarines F11 and F13, interfered with the bombardment and ultimately forced Budapest and Wien to withdraw.

On 28 November 1917, an Austro-Hungarian Navy force consisting of Dinara, Huszár, Reka, Streiter, the destroyers Dikla and Triglav, and the torpedo boats TB 78, TB 79, TB 86, and TB 90 attacked the Italian coast. While Dikla, Huszár, Streiter, and the torpedo boats unsuccessfully attacked first Porto Corsini and then Rimini, Dinara, Reka, and Triglav bombarded a railway near the mouth of the Metauro, damaging a train, the railway tracks, and telegraph lines. The Austro-Hungarian ships then reunited and headed back to the main Austro-Hungarian naval base at Pola. Vincenzo Giordano Orsini, Animoso, Aquila, Ardente, Ardito, Audace, Francesco Stocco, Giovanni Acerbi, Giuseppe Cesare Abba, Giuseppe Sirtori, and Sparviero departed Venice and, together with reconnaissance seaplanes, pursued the Austro-Hungarian formation. The seaplanes attacked the Austro-Hungarians without success, and the Italian ships had to give up the chase when they did not sight the Austro-Hungarians until they neared Cape Promontore on the southern coast of Istria, as continuing beyond it would bring them too close to Pola.

==== 1918 ====
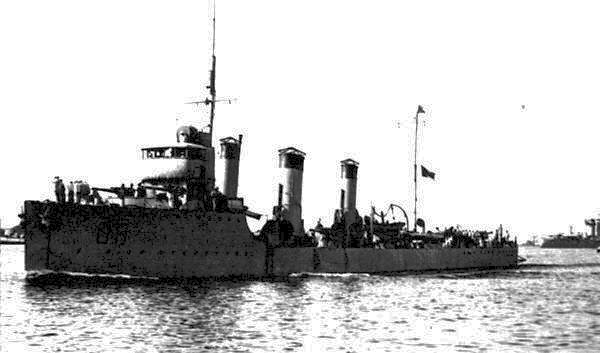
Vincenzo Giordano Orsini at Brindisi, Italy, in 1918.

The Regia Marina planned a raid under the command of Capitano di fregata (Frigate Captain) Costanzo Ciano against the Austro-Hungarian Navy base at Pola by the small boat Grillo, but had to abort the raid during attempts on the nights of 8–9 April, 12–13 April, 6–7 May, 9–10 May, and 11–12 May 1918. At 17:30 on 13 May, Vincenzo Giordano Orsini, Animoso, Francesco Stocco, Giovanni Acerbi, Giuseppe Sirtori, the coastal torpedo boats 9 PN and 10 PN, the motor torpedo boats MAS 95 and MAS 96, and Grillo got underway from Venice to attempt the raid again, with the MAS boats towing Grillo. Grillo dropped her tow line at 02:18 on 14 May and began her attempt to penetrate the harbor at Pola. Grillo's attack, conducted between 03:16 and 03:18, achieved no success and resulted in Grillo's destruction. Austro-Hungarian searchlights illuminated the MAS boats waiting offshore at 03:35 and again at 03:40, so they withdrew and rejoined the supporting destroyers at 05:00. The Italian force then headed back to port.

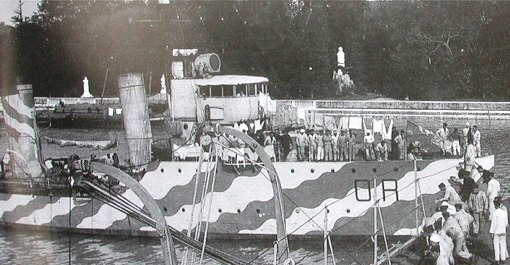
Vincenzo Giordano Orsini painted in a camouflage pattern in 1918.

On the night of 1–2 July 1918 Vincenzo Giordano Orsini — by then under the command of Capitano di corvetta (Corvette Captain) Domenico Cavagnari, a future admiral and Regia Marina chief pf staff — and Audace, Francesco Stocco, Giovanni Acerbi, Giuseppe Sirtori, and the destroyers Giuseppe La Masa and Giuseppe Missori provided distant support to a formation consisting of the torpedo boats Climene and Procione and the coastal torpedo boats 15 OS, 18 OS, 48 OS, 3 PN, 40 PN, 64 PN, 65 PN, and 66 PN. While 15 OS, 18 OS, and 3 PN, towing dummy landing pontoons, staged a simulated amphibious landing to distract Austro-Hungarian troops in support of an Italian advance on the Italian front, 48 OS, 40 PN, 64 PN, 65 PN, and 66 PN bombarded the Austro-Hungarian lines between Cortellazzo and Caorle, proceeding at low speed between the two locations, with Climeme and Procione in direct support.

An Austro-Hungarian force consisting of the destroyers Balaton and Csikós and the torpedo boats TB 83F and TB 88F had put to sea from Pola late on the evening of 1 July to support an Austro-Hungarian air raid on Venice. After an Italian MAS boat made an unsuccessful torpedo attack against Balaton, which was operating with a faulty boiler, at first light on 2 July, the Italian and Austro-Hungarian destroyers sighted one another at 03:10 on 2 July. The Italians opened gunfire on the Austro-Hungarians, who returned fire. During the brief exchange of gunfire that followed, Balaton, in a more advanced position, suffered several shell hits on her forward deck, while Audace, Giuseppe La Masa, and Giuseppe Missori fired on Csikós and the two torpedo boats, scoring a hit on Csikós in her aft boiler room and one hit on each of the torpedo boats. On the Italian side, Francesco Stocco suffered damage which set her on fire and killed and injured some of her crew. While Giovanni Acerbi remained behind to assist Francesco Stocco, the Austro-Hungarians withdrew toward Pola and the Italians resumed operations in support of their own torpedo boats.

By late October 1918, Austria-Hungary had effectively disintegrated, and the Armistice of Villa Giusti, signed on 3 November 1918, went into effect on 4 November 1918 and brought hostilities between Austria-Hungary and the Allies to an end. On the morning of 4 November, Vincenzo Giordano Orsini, Francesco Stocco, Giovanni Acerbi, and Giuseppe Sirtori got underway from Venice with the battleship Emanuele Filiberto, flagship of Contrammiraglio (Counter Admiral) Guglielmo Rainer, in command of the operation, to take possession of Fiume. During the voyage, Giovanni Acerbi and Vincenzo Giordano Orsini were detached, Giovanni Acerbi to occupy Opatija (known to the Italians as Abbazio) and call at Volosko (known to the Italians as Volosca) on 4 November, and Vincenzo Giordano Orsini to occupy Lošinj (known to the Italians as Lussino).

After passing between Zabudaki and Punta Bianca, Vincenzo Giordano Orsini docked 13:15 on 4 November at Mali Lošinj (known to the Italians as Lussinpiccolo) on Lošinj, where Yugoslav soldiers already had a strong presence. An Italian military contingent disembarked from the destroyer and was welcomed favourably by the Italian population of the island. However, significant problems arose from the very beginning: First, a Croatian officer who previously had served in the Austro-Hungarian Navy protested the Italian occupation, and TB 82, a former Austro-Hungarian torpedo boat which had become Yugoslavian, arrived in port. On land, the commanding officer of TB 82 tried to raise the Yugoslav flag at the fort on the island alongside the Italian one on behalf of the local Croatian population to declare the sovereignty of the Kingdom of Serbs, Croats, and Slovenes (later renamed the Kingdom of Yugoslavia) over Lošinj, and on 6 November the crew of TB 82 also raised a Yugoslav flag at their barracks.

The Croatian clergy on the island also protested the Italian claim of sovereignty. However, Cavagnari managed to persuade the Yugoslavian soldiers to lower their flag and to allow themselves to be disarmed, then made them embark on TB 82, which took them to Fiume on 7 November. then proclaimed the sovereignty of Italy over the island; this achievement later earned him the title of Knight of the Military Order of Savoy. On 8 November, Giovanni Acerbi joined Vincenzo Giordano Orsini at Lošinj, and World War I ended on 11 November 1918 with the armistice between the Allies and the German Empire on 11 November 1918. However, the matter of Italian sovereignty over Lošinj was considered concluded only on 20 November, with the evacuation and disarmament of the forts, the transfer to Fiume of all remaining Yugoslav soldiers, and the Italian confiscation of war materials, a yacht, and some merchant ships. In the days following the armistice, Vincenzo Giordano Orsini also made a voyage from Venice to Fiume, crossing for the first time stretches of water containing minefields.

=== Interwar period ===
Before Italy entered World War I in May 1915, it had made a pact with the Allies, the Treaty of London of 1915, in which it was promised all of the Austrian Littoral, but not the city of Fiume (known in Croatian as Rijeka). At the Paris Peace Conference in 1919, this delineation of territory under the Treaty of London was confirmed, with Fiume remaining outside of Italy's borders and amalgamated into the Kingdom of the Serbs, Croats and Slovenes (later the Kingdom of Yugoslavia). Opposing this outcome, the poet and Italian nationalist Gabriele D'Annunzio led a force of about 2,600 so-called "legionaries" to Fiume and seized the city in September 1919 in what became known as the Impresa di Fiume ("Fiume endeavor" or "Fiume enterprise"). On 2 February 1920, Vincenzo Giordano Orsini and the transport Città di Roma were steaming from Ancona, Italy, to Pola with a cargo of supplies and ammunition for the Regia Marina when D'Annunzio's legionaries captured them and diverted them to Fiume. The ships later were released.

In 1920 Giovanni Acerbi underwent modifications which saw the replacement of her six single 102-millimetre (4 in)/35 mm Schneider-Armstrong 1914-15 guns with the more modern 102-millimetre (4 in)/45 Schneider-Armstrong 1917 model. During the latter half of the 1920s, her seco-in-command was Tenente di vascello (Ship-of-the-Line Lieutenant) Francesco Dell'Anno, a future recipient of the Gold Medal of Military Valor.

On 1 October 1929, Vincenzo Giordano Orsini and her sister ships were reclassified as torpedo boats. In 1931, she transported Omar al-Mukhtar, leader of the anti-colonial resistance in Libya, along the coast of Cyrenaica from Bardia, where he had been taken after his capture, to Benghazi, Libya, where he was tried and sentenced to death. In the early 1930s, she was based at Taranto, Italy, as a training ship, part of the Mechanics Training Ship Group. In 1934 she was stationed in Libya.

=== World War II ===
World War II broke out in September 1939 with Nazi Germany's invasion of Poland. With tensions running high between still-neutral Fascist Italy and the Allies, Vincenzo Giordano Orsini — by then stationed with the Regia Marina's Red Sea Flotilla at Massawa in the Eritrea Governorate of Italian East Africa — encountered the Royal Australian Navy light cruiser HMAS Hobart in the Red Sea on 3 June 1940. Italy joined the war on the side of the Axis powers with its invasion of France a week later, on 10 June 1940.

When Italy entered the war, Vincenzo Giordano Orsini and Giovanni Acerbi both were based at Massawa under the direct command of the Naval Command of Massawa. Vincenzo Giordano Orsini carried out a few short-duration operations along the coast of Eritrea, but took part in no significant actions. According to some sources, some of her 40-millimetre/39 automatic cannons could have been landed to improve the defenses of Massawa.

Allied forces conquered Italian East Africa in the East African campaign of 1940–1941. At the beginning of April 1941, Allied troops gradually occupied the Eritrea Governorate and Massawa was close to falling to them. On 7 and 8 April 1941, Vincenzo Giordano Orsini contributed to the final defense of the city, opening fire as soon as the first British troops were sighted approaching Massawa, bombarding Embereni, about 20 miles (32 km) north of Massawa with her 102-millimetre (4 in)/45 guns and 40-millimetre/39 automatic cannons until she ran out of ammunition. The bombardment inflicted heavy damage and losses on the Allied armored columns and slowed them.

On 8 April 1941, with the ship out of ammunition and unable to reach any friendly or neutral port, Vincenzo Giordano Orsini's commanding officer ordered his crew to scuttle her. Her crew decided not to use explosives, as they could have damaged the hospital ship Ramb IV and the hospital on land, both of which were nearby. Instead, the crew opened Vincenzo Giordano Orsini's seacocks, destroyed some of the pipes in her engine room, opened her portholes, and abandoned ship. The ship sank slowly at first, then more quickly as water began to enter her hull through the open portholes. She finally rolled onto her starboard side and sank by the stern, with her bow rising into the air. Her wreck settled in 27 metres (89 ft) of water 0.5 nautical miles (0.9 km; 0.6 mi) east of the Abd el Kader peninsula, not far from the Naval Command of Massawa dock.
