= Italian destroyer Ardito (1912) =

Italian destroyer

History

Kingdom of Italy
- Name: Ardito
- Namesake: "Bold"
- Builder: Cantiere navale fratelli Orlando, Livorno, Kingdom of Italy
- Laid down: 1912
- Launched: 20 October 1912
- Commissioned: 1913
- Reclassified: Torpedo boat 1 October 1929
- Stricken: 2 October 1931
- Identification: Pennant numbers AI, AO, AT
- Fate: Discarded and scrapped

General characteristics
- Class & type: Ardito-class destroyer
- Displacement: Full load: 790 long tons (800 t)
- Length: 73 m (239 ft 6 in) loa
- Beam: 7.3 m (23 ft 11 in)
- Draft: 2.4 m (7 ft 10 in)
- Installed power: 4 × water-tube boilers; 16,000 shaft horsepower (11,931 kW)
- Propulsion: 2 × steam turbines; 2 × screw propellers
- Speed: 30 knots (56 km/h; 35 mph)
- Range: 1,200 nmi (2,200 km; 1,400 mi) at 14 knots (26 km/h; 16 mph)
- Complement: 5 × officers; 65 × enlisted men
- Armament: 1 × 120 mm (4.7 in) gun; 4 × 76 mm (3 in) guns; 2 × 450 mm (17.7 in) torpedo tubes

Ardito (English: "Bold") was the lead ship of the Italian Ardito-class destroyers. Commissioned into service in the Italian Regia Marina (Royal Navy) in 1913, she served in World War I, playing an active role in the Adriatic campaign. Reclassified as a torpedo boat in 1929, she was discarded in 1931.

== Design ==
The ships of the Ardito class were 74.8 m (245 ft 5 in) long at the waterline and 73 m (239 ft 6 in) long overall, with a beam of 7.3 m (23 ft 11 in) and a draft of 2.4 m (7 ft 10 in). They displaced 695 long tons (706 t) standard and up to 790 long tons (800 t) at full load. They had a crew of 4 officers and 65 enlisted men. The ships were powered by two Parsons steam turbines, with steam provided by four Thornycroft water-tube boilers. The engines were rated to produce 16,000 shaft horsepower (11,931 kW) for a top speed of 30 knots (56 km/h; 35 mph), though in service they reached as high as 33.4 knots (61.9 km/h; 38.4 mph) from 15,733 shp (11,732 kW). At a more economical speed of 14 knots (26 km/h; 16 mph), the ships could cruise for 1,200 nautical miles (2,200 km; 1,400 mi).

The ship carried an armament that consisted of a single 120 mm (4.7 in) gun and four 76 mm (3 in) guns, along with two 450 mm (17.7 in) torpedo tubes. The 120 mm gun was mounted on the forecastle and two of the 76 mm guns were mounted abreast the funnels, with the remaining pair at the stern. The torpedo tubes were in single mounts, both on the centerline.

== Construction and commissioning ==
Ardito was laid down at the Cantiere navale fratelli Orlando (English: Orlandi Brothers Shipyard) in Leghorn (Livorno), Italy, in 1912. She was launched on 20 October 1912 and commissioned in 1913.

== Service history ==
=== World War I ===
==== 1915 ====
World War I broke out in 1914, and the Kingdom of Italy entered the war on the side of the Allies with its declaration of war on Austria-Hungary on 23 May 1915. At the time, Ardito and the destroyers Animoso, Ardente, Audace, and Francesco Nullo made up the 1st Destroyer Squadron, based at Brindisi, with the squadron under the command of Capitano di corvetta (Corvette Captain) Caccia. On 24 May Ardito, Animoso, and Audace carried out an anti-submarine patrol in the Gulf of Drin off the coast of the Principality of Albania and subsequently off Cattaro, a major base of the Austro-Hungarian Navy. On 9 June 1915, Ardito, Animoso, Ardente, Audace, the destroyers Indomito, Intrepido, Impetuoso, Irrequieto, and Insidioso and the protected cruiser Quarto escorted the armored cruisers Giuseppe Garibaldi and Vettor Pisani as they participated in the bombardment of the lighthouses at the Cape of Rodon and Shëngjin (known to the Italians as San Giovanni di Medua) on the coast of Albania.

On 11 July 1915 Ardito, Animoso, Ardente, and Audace escorted Quarto to the Palagruža (known to the Italians as the Pelagosa) archipelago in the Adriatic Sea, where they landed the vanguard of an occupation force. The auxiliary cruiser Città di Palermo, the protected cruiser Marsala, the destroyer Strale, and the torpedo boats Airone, Arpia, Astore, Calliope, Cassiopea, and Clio also took part in the operation, which went smoothly: Two Austro-Hungarian signalmen, who first hid from and then surrendered to the Italians, made up the archipelago's entire garrison.

At 04:00 on 17 July 1915 Ardito, together with Giuseppe Garibaldi, Vettor Pisani, Ardente, Strale, Airone, Arpia, Astore, Calliope, Clio, the armored cruiser Varese, and the torpedo boats Alcione, Centauro, and Cigno, took part in a bombardment of the Ragusa–Cattaro railway. The Italian force broke off the bombardment when Vettor Pisani sighted an Austro-Hungarian submarine at 04:25. The Italians had begun their return voyage to Brindisi when the Austro-Hungarian submarine U-4 attacked the formation at 04:40 and torpedoed Giuseppe Garibaldi, which sank within minutes.

A few hours after an Austro-Hungarian Navy force subjected Palagruža to a heavy bombardment during the night of 16–17 August 1915, Ardito, Quarto, Animoso, Intrepido, and the destroyer Impavido, which were on a cruise in the Adriatic Sea north of the line Brindisi–Cattaro, interrupted their operations to respond. They reached Palagruža at around 10:00 on 17 August 1915.

During the night of 11–12 December 1915 Ardito and the destroyer Simone Schiaffino escorted the steamships Epiro and Molfetta from Brindisi to Durrës (known to the Italians as Durazzo) in Albania, where the two steamers delivered supplies for the Serbian Army. After monitoring the unloading of the supplies, the destroyers escorted the steamers back to Brindisi.

==== 1916 ====
On 23 February 1916, Ardito, Indomito, Impetuoso, and the protected cruisers Libia and Puglia positioned themselves in the harbor at Durrës to protect the withdrawal of the "Savona" Brigade. Starting on 24 February 1916, the five ships, together with the destroyers Irrequieto and Bersagliere and the auxiliary cruisers Città di Siracusa and Città di Catania, began to bombard advancing Austro-Hungarian troops who were about to occupy Durrës. In the following days they also bombarded Austro-Hungarian artillery positions on the mountain Sasso Bianco in the Dolomites near Durrës.

While Ardito and Città di Siracusa were inspecting the Otranto Barrage in the Strait of Otranto on 31 May 1916, the Austro-Hungarian destroyers Balaton and Orjen attacked the barrage and sank Beneficent, a naval drifter (an armed fishing boat) that was one of the vessels responsible for laying and supervising the anti-submarine nets that formed the barrage. Centauro and the destroyer Aquilone got underway from Brindisi to reinforce Ardito and Città di Siracusa, and the four ships intervened and forced the Austro-Hungarian destroyers to retreat.

On 2 August 1916, Ardito and the French Navy destroyers Bisson, Commandant Bory, and Commandant Rivière supported an incursion carried out by the motor torpedo boat MAS 6, supported by the torpedo boats 33 PN and 37 PN, into the harbor at Durrës. MAS 6 penetrated the harbor and launched a torpedo. Her crew believed they torpedoed a steamer, but Austro-Hungarian sources reported no ships sunk or damaged.

==== 1917 ====
On 11 May 1917 Ardito, under the command of Commander Gottardi, got underway from Venice together with Animoso, Ardente, Audace, and the destroyer Giuseppe Cesare Abba to intercept an Austro-Hungarian Navy force consisting of the destroyer Csikos and the torpedo boats 78 T, 93 T, and 96 T sighted at 15:30 about 10 kilometers (5.4 nmi; 6.2 mi) away. However, the Italians were unable to engage the Austro-Hungarian ships before they reached the vicinity of the major Austro-Hungarian Navy base at Pola, and after approaching Pola the Italian ships gave up the chase and returned to Venice.

On 29 September 1917 Ardito, now under the command of Capitano di corvetta (Corvette Captain) Inigo Campioni, a future ammiraglio di squadra (squadron admiral) and commander of the Italian battlefleet during World War II, put to sea with Ardente and Audace and a second formation made up of Giuseppe Cesare Abba, the scout cruiser Sparviero, and the destroyers Giovanni Acerbi, Vincenzo Giordano Orsini, and Francesco Stocco to support a bombing raid by 10 Italian airplanes against Pola. They encountered an Austro-Hungarian force composed of the destroyers Huszár, Streiter, Turul, and Velebit and four torpedo boats on a similar mission against an Italian airbase. The Italians opened fire just before midnight at a range of 3,000 metres (3,300 yards), but received the worst of the initial exchange as the Austro-Hungarians concentrated their fire on the leading ship, Sparviero. Sparviero was hit five times, but only three men were wounded, and one Italian destroyer was hit. As the Austro-Hungarians retreated towards the shelter of their minefields, the Italians crippled Velebit and set her on fire. Another Austro-Hungarian destroyer took her in tow and both sides returned to port after an inconclusive exchange of fire inside the minefields later that night during the predawn hours of 30 September..

On 28 November 1917, an Austro-Hungarian Navy force consisting of Huszár, Reka, Streiter, the destroyers Dikla, Dinara, and Triglav, and the torpedo boats TB 78, TB 79, TB 86, and TB 90 attacked the Italian coast. While Dikla, Huszár, Streiter and the torpedo boats unsuccessfully attacked first Porto Corsini and then Rimini, Dinara, Reka, and Triglav bombarded a railway near the mouth of the Metauro, damaging a train, the railway tracks, and telegraph lines. The Austro-Hungarian ships then reunited and headed back to the main Austro-Hungarian naval base at Pola. Ardito, Animoso, Ardente, Ardito, Audace, Francesco Stocco, Giovanni Acerbi, Giuseppe Cesare Abba, Sparviero, Vincenzo Giordano Orsini, and the destroyers Aquila and Giuseppe Sirtori departed Venice and, together with reconnaissance seaplanes, pursued the Austro-Hungarian formation. The seaplanes attacked the Austro-Hungarians without success, and the Italian ships had to give up the chase when they did not sight the Austro-Hungarians until they neared Cape Promontore on the southern coast of Istria, as continuing beyond it would bring them too close to Pola.

==== 1918 ====
On 10 February 1918 Ardito, Aquila, Ardente, Francesco Stocco, Giovanni Acerbi, and Giuseppe Sirtori — and, according to some sources, the motor torpedo boat MAS 18 — steamed to Porto Levante, now a part of Porto Viro, in case they were needed to support an incursion into the harbor at Bakar (known to the Italians as Buccari) by MAS motor torpedo boats. Sources disagree on whether they remained in port or put to sea to operate in distant support, but in any event, their intervention was unnecessary. The motor torpedo boats carried out their raid, which became known in Italy as the Beffa di Buccari ("Bakar mockery").

By late October 1918, Austria-Hungary had effectively disintegrated, and the Armistice of Villa Giusti, signed on 3 November 1918, went into effect on 4 November 1918 and brought hostilities between Austria-Hungary and the Allies to an end. At 15:30 on 4 November, Ardito, after steaming from Venice, docked at Rovinj (known to the Italians as Rovigno), taking possession of the city on behalf of the Kingdom of Italy. World War I ended a week later with the armistice between the Allies and the German Empire on 11 November 1918.

=== Post-World War I ===
After the end of World War I, Ardito′s armament was revised, giving her five 102 mm (4 in)/35-caliber guns, a single 40 mm (1.6 in)/35-caliber gun, and a pair of 6.5 mm (0.26 in) machine guns. The work was completed by 1920.

Ardito was reclassified as a torpedo boat on 1 October 1929. On 2 October 1931, she was struck from the naval register. She subsequently was discarded and scrapped.
