= Italian destroyer Animoso (1913) =

Italian Audace-class destroyer (1913)

History

Kingdom of Italy
- Name: Animoso
- Namesake: Spirited
- Laid down: May 1912
- Launched: 13 July 1913
- Commissioned: May 1914
- Decommissioned: April 1923
- Stricken: 5 April 1923
- Fate: Scrapped

General characteristics
- Class & type: Audace-class destroyer
- Displacement: Full load: 840 long tons (850 t)
- Length: 75.5 m (247 ft 8 in) loa
- Beam: 7.5 m (24 ft 7 in)
- Draft: 2.6 m (8 ft 6 in)
- Installed power: 4 × water-tube boilers; 16,000 shp (12,000 kW)
- Propulsion: 2 × steam turbines; 2 × screw propellers
- Speed: 30 knots (56 km/h; 35 mph)
- Range: 950 nmi (1,760 km; 1,090 mi) at 14 knots (26 km/h; 16 mph)
- Complement: 4–5 officers; 65–74 enlisted men
- Armament: As built: 1 × 120 mm (4.7 in) gun; 4 × 76 mm (3 in) guns; 2 × 450 mm (17.7 in) torpedo tubes; 1920: 5 × 102 mm (4 in) gun; 2 × 40 mm (1.6 in) guns; 2 × 6.5 mm (0.26 in) machine guns; 2 × 450 mm (17.7 in) torpedo tubes; 10 x mines

Animoso was the second and final Audace-class destroyer of the Italian Regia Marina ("Royal Navy"). Commissioned in 1914, she played an active role in the Adriatic campaign of World War I. Badly damaged by an accidental explosion in 1921, she was stricken in 1923.

== Design ==
The ships of the Audace class were 74.8 m (245 ft 5 in) long at the waterline and 75.5 m (247 ft 8 in) long overall, with a beam of 7.5 m (24 ft 7 in) and a draft of 2.6 m (8 ft 6 in). They displaced 740 long tons (750 t) standard and up to 840 long tons (850 t) at full load. They had a crew of four to five officers and 65 to 74 enlisted men. The ships were powered by two Zoelly steam turbines, with steam provided by four White-Forster water-tube boilers. The engines were rated to produce 16,000 shaft horsepower (11,931 kW) for a top speed of 30 knots (56 km/h; 35 mph), though in service they reached as high as 36.1 knots (66.9 km/h; 41.5 mph) with 15,000 shp (11,185 kW). At a more economical speed of 14 knots (26 km/h; 16 mph), the ships could cruise for 950 nautical miles (1,760 km; 1,090 mi).

The ship carried an armament that consisted of a single 120 mm (4.7 in) gun and four 76 mm (3 in) guns, along with two 450 mm (17.7 in) torpedo tubes. The 120 mm gun was placed on the forecastle and two of the 76 mm guns were mounted abreast of the funnels, with the remaining pair at the stern. The torpedo tubes were in single mounts, both on the centerline.

The design of the Audace-class ships was based on that of the preceding Indomito class. During operations, the Audace class revealed somewhat disappointing characteristics.

== Construction and commissioning ==
Animoso was laid down at the Cantiere navale fratelli Orlando ("Orlandi Brothers Shipyard") in Leghorn (Livorno) in May 1912, and was launched on 4 May 1913. She was commissioned in March 1914.

== Service history ==
=== World War I ===
==== 1915 ====
World War I broke out in 1914, and the Kingdom of Italy entered the war on the side of the Allies with its declaration of war on Austria-Hungary on 23 May 1915. At the time, Animoso, under the command of Capitano di corvetta (Corvette Captain) Cantu, and the destroyers Ardente, Ardito, Audace, and Francesco Nullo made up the 1st Destroyer Squadron, based at Brindisi, with the squadron under the command of Capitano di corvetta (Corvette Captain) Caccia. On 24 May Audace, Animoso, and Ardito carried out an anti-submarine patrol in the Gulf of Drin off the coast of the Principality of Albania and subsequently off Cattaro, a major base of the Austro-Hungarian Navy.

On 11 July 1915 Animoso, Ardente, Ardito, and Audace escorted the protected cruiser Quarto to the Palagruža (known to the Italians as the Pelagosa) archipelago in the Adriatic Sea, where they landed the vanguard of an occupation force. The auxiliary cruiser Città di Palermo, the protected cruiser Marsala, the destroyer Strale, and the torpedo boats Airone, Arpia, Astore, Calliope, Cassiopea, and Clio also took part in the operation, which went smoothly: Two Austro-Hungarian signalmen, who first hid from and then surrendered to the Italians, made up the archipelago's entire garrison.

In the early hours of 17 July 1915 Animoso, Quarto, and the destroyers Intrepido and Irrequieto bombarded the radiotelegraph station and other Austro-Hungarian military installations on Šipan (known to the Italians as Giuppana), an island off the coast of Dalmatia. The bombardment, as well as another one carried out by the 5th Naval Division, was interrupted when the armored cruiser Vettor Pisani of the 5th Naval Division sighted an Austro-Hungarian submarine at 04:25. After the Italian ships began their return voyage to Italy, the Austro-Hungarian submarine U-4 attacked at 04:40 and torpedoed the armored cruiser Giuseppe Garibaldi, which sank within minutes. Rescue efforts saved 525 men out of the 578 on board Giuseppe Garibaldi.

A few hours after an Austro-Hungarian Navy force subjected the Palagruža archipelago to a heavy bombardment during the night of 16–17 August 1915, Animoso, Ardito, Intrepido, Quarto, and the destroyer Impavido, which were on a cruise in the Adriatic Sea north of the line Brindisi–Cattaro, interrupted their operations to respond. They reached Palagruža at around 10:00 on 17 August 1915.

==== 1916–1917 ====
Animoso did not participate in any noteworthy operations or events in 1916, but on 11 May 1917 she, Ardente, Ardito, the new destroyer Audace, and the destroyer Giuseppe Cesare Abba got underway from Venice to intercept an Austro-Hungarian Navy force consisting of the destroyer Csikos and the torpedo boats 78 T, 93 T, and 96 T. They sighted the Austro-Hungarian ships at 15:30 at a range of about 10,000 meters (10,900 yd) but were unable to engage the Austro-Hungarian ships before they escaped behind the protection of a minefield near the major Austro-Hungarian Navy base at Pola, and after approaching Pola the Italian ships gave up the chase and returned to Venice.

On the night of 13–14 August 1917 Animoso left Venice with Ardente, Audace, Giuseppe Cesare Abba, and the destroyers Carabiniere, Francesco Stocco, Giovanni Acerbi, Giuseppe Sirtori, Pontiere, and Vincenzo Giordano Orsini to intercept an Austro-Hungarian force made up of the destroyers Dinara, Reka, Sharfschutze, Streiter, and Velebit and six torpedo boats which had supported an air raid by 32 aircraft against the fortress of Venice which had struck San Giovanni e Paolo Hospital, killing 14 people and injuring around 30 others. Only Vincenzo Giordano Orsini managed to make brief and fleeting contact with the Austro-Hungarian ships before they escaped behind a protective minefield.

From 18 to 24 August 1917, during the first week of the Eleventh Battle of the Isonzo along the Isonzo on the Italian front, Animoso served as the flagship of Rear Admiral Casanova as he directed Italian naval cooperation with the operations of the Italian Royal Army.

On 16 November 1917 Animoso, Ardente, Audace, Francesco Stocco, Giovanni Acerbi, Giuseppe Cesare Abba, and Vincenzo Giordano Orsini got underway to respond to a bombardment carried out by the Austro-Hungarian coastal defense ships Wien and Budapest from the Gulf of Trieste against Italian artillery batteries and other coastal defenses at Cortellazzo, near the mouth of the Piave. The destroyers supported an attack by the Italian motor torpedo boats MAS 13 and MAS 15 which, together with attacks by Italian aircraft and the Italian submarines F11 and F13, disrupted the bombardment and forced the two Austro-Hungarian ships to withdraw. On 18 November 1917 Animoso, Ardente, Audace, and Giuseppe Cesare Abba bombarded the Austrian-Hungarian lines on the Italian front between Caorle and Revedoli, and over the following several days Animoso took part in several other bombardment operations against Austro-Hungarian forces in northern Italy, concluding on 25 November.

On 28 November 1917, an Austro-Hungarian Navy force consisting of Dinara, Reka, Streiter, the destroyers Dikla, Huszár, and Triglav, and the torpedo boats TB 78, TB 79, TB 86, and TB 90 attacked the Italian coast. While Dikla, Huszár, Streiter, and the torpedo boats unsuccessfully attacked first Porto Corsini and then Rimini, Dinara, Reka, and Triglav bombarded a railway near the mouth of the Metauro, damaging a train, the railway tracks, and telegraph lines. The Austro-Hungarian ships then reunited and headed back to the main Austro-Hungarian naval base at Pola. Animoso, Ardente, Ardito, Audace, Francesco Stocco, Giovanni Acerbi, Giuseppe Cesare Abba, Giuseppe Sirtori, Vincenzo Giordano Orsini, and the scout cruisers Aquila and Sparviero departed Venice and, together with reconnaissance seaplanes, pursued the Austro-Hungarian formation. The seaplanes attacked the Austro-Hungarians without success, and the Italian ships had to give up the chase when they did not sight the Austro-Hungarians until they neared Cape Promontore on the southern coast of Istria, as continuing beyond it would bring them too close to Pola. Animoso provided cover to a naval bombardment operation against Austro-Hungarian positions on the Italian front on 19 December 1917.

==== 1918 ====
On 10 February 1918, Animoso — under the command of Capitano di fregata (Frigate Captain) Arturo Ciano, a future admiral — got underway from Venice at 10:45 with Audace and Giuseppe Cesare Abba to participate in a raid on Bakar (known to the Italians as Buccari) on the coast of Austria-Hungary. While Ardente, Aquila, Ardito, Francesco Stocco, Giovanni Acerbi, and Giuseppe Sirtori stood by at Porto Levante in case they needed to support the operation, Animoso, Audace, and Giuseppe Cesare Abba towed the motor torpedo boats MAS 94, MAS 95, and MAS 96 to the pre-established "Point O," 20 nautical miles (37 km; 23 mi) east of Sansego, where they passed their tow cables to the coastal torpedo boats 12 PN, 13 PN, and 18 PN, then cruised 50 nautical miles (93 km; 58 mi) off Ancona while the coastal torpedo boats towed the MAS boats closer to the coast and the MAS boats carried out the raid. The results of the raid — damage to one steamer — were militarily insignificant, but the raid was of great propaganda value in Italy, where it was celebrated widely as the "Bakar mockery" (Beffa di Buccari), aspects of which the Italian nationalist poet Gabriele D'Annunzio, who took part in the raid, orchestrated.

The Regia Marina planned a raid under the command of Capitano di fregata (Frigate Captain) Costanzo Ciano against the Austro-Hungarian Navy base at Pola by the small boat Grillo, but had to abort the raid during attempts on the nights of 8–9 April, 12–13 April, 6–7 May, 9–10 May, and 11–12 May 1918. At 17:30 on 13 May, Animoso, Francesco Stocco, Giovanni Acerbi, Giuseppe Sirtori, Vincenzo Giordano Orsini, the coastal torpedo boats 9 PN and 10 PN, the motor torpedo boats MAS 95 and MAS 96, and Grillo got underway from Venice to attempt the raid again, with the MAS boats towing Grillo. Grillo dropped her tow line at 02:18 on 14 May and began her attempt to penetrate the harbor at Pola. Grillo′s attack, conducted between 03:16 and 03:18, achieved no success and resulted in Grillo′s destruction. Austro-Hungarian searchlights illuminated the MAS boats waiting offshore at 03:35 and again at 03:40, so they withdrew and rejoined the supporting destroyers at 05:00. The Italian force then headed back to port.

By late October 1918, Austria-Hungary had effectively disintegrated, and the Armistice of Villa Giusti, signed on 3 November 1918, went into effect on 4 November 1918 and brought hostilities between Austria-Hungary and the Allies to an end. World War I ended a week later with the armistice between Allies and the German Empire on 11 November 1918.

=== Post-World War I ===
After World War I, Animoso was rearmed in 1919–1920. All of her guns were removed and replaced by five Cannon 102 mm (4 in)/35 Model 1914 and two Vickers-Terni 40/39 mm Mod. 1917 guns and two 6.5 mm (0.26 in)/80 machine guns. She also was equipped to transport and lay 10 mines.

Under the command of Capitano di corvetta (Corvette Captain) Treviliani, Animoso was in Dock No. 1 at the Taranto Arsenal on 27 July 1921 when her boilers were turned to test the functioning of a fan. At 09:10 a boiler exploded. The explosion damaged some of Animoso′s oil pipes in addition to the boiler, knocked over one of her funnels, wrecked her superstructure, started a fire, and caused flooding amidships. Firefighters and sailors rushed aboard, extinguished the fire, and rescued burn victims. Initially, six men were thought to have died in the explosion, with numerous others injured, including two seriously, but later it was determined that three men were killed and four others had suffered serious burns.

Listing to port and seriously damaged, Animoso was towed into dry dock, but was never repaired, She was decommissioned in April 1923, stricken from the naval register on 5 April 1923, and subsequently scrapped.
