= Huszar =

Huszar or Huszár as a surname can refer to:

- Károly Huszár (1882–1941), Hungarian Prime Minister from 1919 to 1920
- Vilmos Huszár (1884–1960), Hungarian painter, designer and De Stijl group member
- Huszár-class destroyer, a class of destroyers of the Austro-Hungarian Navy
- SMS Huszár, the name of two Austro-Hungarian Navy destroyers
- An alternative spelling of Hussar
