= Italian ship Ardente =

Ardente was the name of at least two ships of the Italian Navy and may refer to:

- Italian destroyer Ardente, an Ardito-class destroyer launched in 1912 and discarded in 1937.
- Italian torpedo boat Ardente, a Ciclone-class torpedo boat launched in 1942 and sunk in 1943.
