= SMS Huszár =

SMS Huszár was the name of two ships of the Austro-Hungarian Navy:

- SMS Huszár (1905), a Huszár-class destroyer completed in 1905 and wrecked in 1908
- SMS Huszár (1910), a Huszár-class destroyer completed in 1911 and ceded to Italy in 1920
