= Carabinieri (disambiguation) =

Carabinieri (singular form: carabiniere) is the name given to the gendarmerie-style police forces of some countries. It may refer specifically to:

- Arma dei Carabinieri, the gendarmerie of Italy
  - Carabinieri (TV series), a 2000s Italian TV series
- Trupele de Carabinieri, the gendarmerie of Moldova

== See also ==
- Carabinier § Law enforcement carabiniers for other similarly-named police forces
- Italian ship Carabiniere, a list of ships with the name
