= SMS Huszár (1905) =

History

Austria-Hungary
- Name: Huszár
- Namesake: Hussar
- Builder: Yarrows, Cubitt Town, London
- Laid down: 14 November 1904
- Launched: 31 May 1905
- Completed: 4 July 1905
- Fate: Ran aground, 3 December 1908, and scrapped

General characteristics (as built)
- Class & type: Huszár-class destroyer
- Displacement: 390 t (380 long tons)
- Length: 68.39 m (224 ft 5 in) (o/a)
- Beam: 6.25 m (20 ft 6 in)
- Draught: 1.8 m (5 ft 11 in)
- Installed power: 4 × Yarrow boilers; 6,000 ihp (4,500 kW)
- Propulsion: 2 shafts; 2 triple-expansion engines
- Speed: 28 knots (52 km/h; 32 mph)
- Range: 500 nmi (930 km; 580 mi) at 28 knots (52 km/h; 32 mph)
- Complement: 70
- Armament: 1 × single 66 mm (2.6 in) gun; 7 × single 47 mm (1.9 in) guns; 2 × single 45 cm (17.7 in) torpedo tubes

SMS Huszár was the lead ship of her class of a dozen destroyers built for the Austro-Hungarian Navy in the first decade of the 20th century. Completed in 1905, she ran aground three years later. Her wreck was subsequently salvaged shortly afterwards.

== Design and description ==
The Huszar-class ships had a flush deck design with a distinctive "turtleback" forecastle that was intended to clear water from the bow during high-speed navigation, but was poorly designed for high waves or bad weather. The ships normally displaced 390 metric tons (380 long tons) and 420 metric tons (410 long tons) at full load. They measured 68.39 meters (224 ft 5 in) long overall with a beam of 6.25 meters (20 ft 6 in), and a draft of 1.78–1.85 meters (5 ft 10 in – 6 ft 1 in). The ships were propelled by two 4-cylinder triple-expansion steam engines, each driving one propeller shaft using steam from four Yarrow boilers; each boiler was provided with an individual funnel. The turbines were designed to produce a total of 6,000 indicated horsepower (4,500 kW) for an intended maximum speed of 27 knots (50 km/h; 31 mph). During the ships' sea trials, they generally exceeded this figure, reaching 28–28.5 knots (51.9–52.8 km/h; 32.2–32.8 mph). The ships carried enough coal to give them a range of 500 nautical miles (930 km; 580 mi) at 28 knots. Their crew numbered 70 officers and men.

The main armament of the Huszar class consisted of a single 45-caliber Škoda SFK (German: Schnell-Feuer Kanone) 66-millimeter (2.6 in) gun]. The gun was mounted on a platform on the forecastle with the turtleback leading right up to it. Their secondary armament included seven 47-millimeter (1.9 in) guns. Two guns were positioned on the main deck right behind the bow gun's mount, four others were located on the deck amidships; all of these guns were on the broadside. The seventh gun was on the stern. All of the guns were fitted with gun shields. The ships were equipped with two 450-millimeter (17.7 in) torpedo tubes in two single, rotating mounts. One of these was located between the forward gun mount and the superstructure while the other was positioned between the aft funnel and the stern gun.

== Construction and career ==
Huszar was laid down by Yarrow on 14 November 1904 in their London shipyard and launched on 31 May 1905. Completed on 4 July, she arrived at Pula on 28 July where she had her armament installed and various problems rectified. The ship ran aground on 3 December 1908 on a voyage between the Bay of Kotor and Budva and was badly damaged with all of her forward compartments flooded. An effort to pull her free by the armored cruiser Sankt Georg failed when the tow rope broke despite the removal of 130 tonnes (130 long tons) of equipment. A storm began around 10 December and salvage efforts had to be cancelled. The storm threw the destroyer against the rocks and caused the rear compartments to flood. The wreck slid off the rocks on 12 December and sank in 15 meters (49 ft) of water. Salvage efforts resumed on 19 December and all four boilers and one propeller shaft were recovered before efforts were terminated.

== Bibliography ==
- Freivogel, Zvonimir (2021). Austro-Hungarian Destroyers in World War One. Zagreb: Despot Infinitus. ISBN 978-953-366-051-6.
- Noppen, Ryan K. (2016). Austro-Hungarian Cruisers and Destroyers 1914-18. New Vanguard. Vol. 241. Oxford, UK: Osprey Publishing. ISBN 978-1-4728-1470-8.
- Sieche, Erwin (1985). "Austria-Hungary". In Gardiner, Robert & Gray, Randal (eds.). Conway's All the World's Fighting Ships 1906–1921. Annapolis, Maryland: Naval Institute Press. ISBN 0-85177-245-5.
