= SMS Warasdiner =

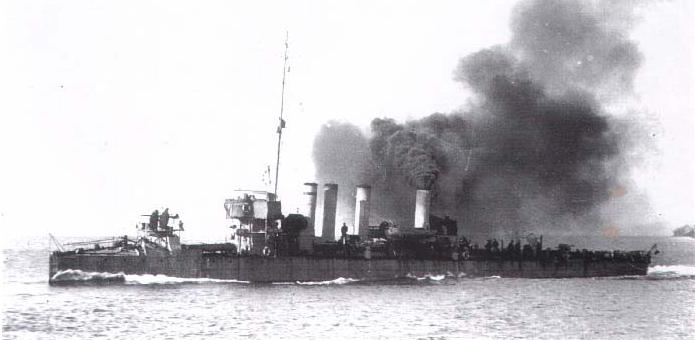
- Warasdiner in August 1914

Class overview
- Name: Warasdiner
- Operators: Austro-Hungarian Navy
- Preceded by: Huszár class
- In commission: 1914
- Completed: 1
- Retired: 1

China
- Name: Lung Tuan
- Builder: STT, Trieste
- Laid down: 1912
- Launched: 1913
- Fate: Seized by Austria-Hungary, 1914

Austria-Hungary
- Name: SMS Warasdiner
- Acquired: Seized 1 August 1914
- Completed: 10 September 1914
- Fate: Ceded to Italy in 1920 and scrapped

General characteristics
- Type: Destroyer
- Displacement: 389 long tons (395 t)
- Length: 68.4 m (224 ft 5 in)
- Beam: 6.3 m (20 ft 8 in)
- Draught: 1.9 m (6 ft 3 in)
- Propulsion: 6,000 ihp (4.5 MW)
- Speed: 30 kn (56 km/h; 35 mph)
- Complement: 75 officers and men
- Armament: 6 × 66 mm (2.6 in); 4 × 45 cm (18 in) torpedo tubes

SMS Warasdiner (Note: "SMS" stands for "Seiner Majestät Schiff ", or "His Majesty's Ship" in German.) was a destroyer launched in 1913 as Lung Tuan (Chinese: 龍湍), intended for sale to China. She was taken over by the Austro-Hungarian Navy in 1914, renamed and rearmed. She served in World War I with the Austro-Hungarian Navy. Following the war, the ship was ceded to Italy and scrapped.

== Construction and design ==
In 1912, China placed an order for a single destroyer with the Austrian shipyard Stabilimento Tecnico Triestino (STT) of Trieste. The design of the destroyer, to be named Lung Tuan, was based on that of the Austro-Hungarian Navy's Huszár-class destroyer, which had entered service between 1905 and 1911.

Like the Huszárs, Lung Tuan was to be powered by two triple expansion steam engines, fed by four Yarrow boilers, rated at 6,000 ihp (4,500 kW), driving two shafts, although at 30 knots (56 km/h; 35 mph), the ship was slightly faster than the 28 knots (52 km/h; 32 mph) Huszár class. The ship's hull was 68 metres (223 ft 1 in) long at the waterline and 67 metres (219 ft 10 in) between perpendiculars, with a beam of 6.2 metres (20 ft 4 in) and a draught of 1.7 metres (5 ft 7 in). Displacement was 386 tonnes (380 long tons) standard and 400 t (390 long tons) deep load. The ship was to be armed with two 12-pounder 76.2 mm (3.00 in) and four 3-pounder 47 mm (1.9 in) guns, all supplied by Armstrong Whitworth of Great Britain and two 18 in (46 cm) torpedo tubes.

Lung Tuan was laid down in 1912 and launched in 1913. (Note: Sieche states that Lung Tuan was laid down in April 1911, and underwent sea trials on 1 July 1912.) Although the Huszár class and therefore Lung Tuan were obsolete by 1913, the Chinese government ordered a further 12 destroyers from STT that year, partly due to the low price (£16,500 per ship).

== Service ==
Lung Tuan was virtually complete when Austria-Hungary declared war with Serbia on 28 July 1914, beginning the First World War. Lung Tuan was seized by Austria-Hungary on 1 August and towed to Pola where she was re-armed with Austrian weapons, receiving a gun outfit of two 66 mm (2.6 in) L/45 Skoda guns (Note: While the gun's actual calibre was 66 mm, it was usually referred to as a 7 cm gun in contemporary literature.) (Note: L/45 refers to the length of the gun's barrel. In this case the barrel was 45 calibres long.) and four 6.6 cm L/30 guns, together with four 45 cm torpedo tubes. Renamed Warasdiner, the ship entered service with the Austro-Hungarian Navy on 10 September 1914.

Warasdiner served for the remainder of the First World War. On 18–19 June 1915, the Austro-Hungarian Navy carried out a series of raids against towns on the Italian Adriatic coast, with Warasdiner shelling Monopoli, south-east of Bari on 19 June. On 5 December 1915 Warasdiner was returning from another raid on the coast of Italy when she sank the French submarine Fresnel, which had run aground off Cattaro. On 2 August 1916 Warasdiner and sister ship Wildfang were returning from bombarding the Italian city of Molfetta when they encountered the French destroyers Bisson and Commandant Bory and the Italian destroyers Ardito and Impavido. The French and Italian destroyers set off in pursuit of the Austro-Hungarian ships, but broke off the chase as they neared the Austrian base of Cattaro (now Kotor), when the Austrian cruiser Aspern and two torpedo boats sortied in support of Warasdiner and Wildfang.

She was ceded to Italy in 1920 and scrapped.
