= SMS Wildfang =

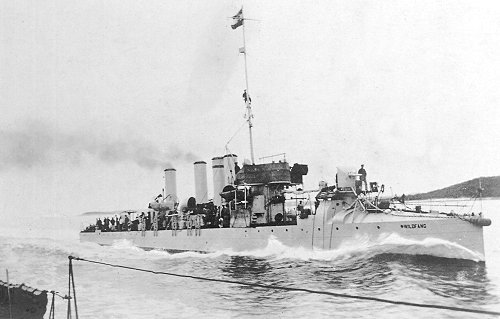
- Wildfang at sea

History

Austria-Hungary
- Name: Wildfang
- Builder: Stabilimento Tecnico Triestino, Trieste
- Laid down: 7 December 1905
- Launched: 29 August 1906
- Completed: 15 June 1907
- Fate: Sunk by a mine, 4 June 1917

General characteristics (as built)
- Class & type: Huszár-class destroyer
- Displacement: 390 t (380 long tons)
- Length: 68.39 m (224 ft 5 in) (o/a)
- Beam: 6.25 m (20 ft 6 in)
- Draught: 1.8 m (5 ft 11 in)
- Installed power: 4 × Yarrow boilers; 6,500 ihp (4,800 kW)
- Propulsion: 2 shafts; 2 triple-expansion engines
- Speed: 29 knots (54 km/h; 33 mph)
- Range: 500 nmi (930 km; 580 mi) at 28 knots (52 km/h; 32 mph)
- Complement: 70
- Armament: 1 × single 66 mm (2.6 in) gun; 7 × single 47 mm (1.9 in) guns; 2 × single 45 cm (17.7 in) torpedo tubes

SMS Wildfang was one of the dozen Huszár-class destroyers built for the Austro-Hungarian Navy in the first decade of the 20th century. She sank after striking a naval mine in 1917 during World War I.

== Design and description ==
The Huszar-class ships had a flush deck design with a distinctive "turtleback" forecastle that was intended to clear water from the bow during high-speed navigation, but was poorly designed for high waves or bad weather. The ships normally displaced 390 metric tons (380 long tons) and 420 metric tons (410 long tons) at full load. They measured 68.39 meters (224 ft 5 in) long overall with a beam of 6.25 meters (20 ft 6 in), and a draft of 1.78–1.85 meters (5 ft 10 in – 6 ft 1 in). The ships were propelled by two 4-cylinder triple-expansion steam engines, each driving one propeller shaft using steam from four Yarrow boilers; each boiler was provided with an individual funnel. Wildfang's turbines were slightly more powerful than those of her sister ships and were designed to produce a total of 6,500 indicated horsepower (4,800 kW) for an intended maximum speed of 27 knots (50 km/h; 31 mph). During the ship's sea trials, she reached 29 knots (54 km/h; 33 mph). The ships carried enough coal to give them a range of 500 nautical miles (930 km; 580 mi) at 28 knots. Their crew numbered 70 officers and men.

The main armament of the Huszar class consisted of a single 45-caliber Škoda SFK (German: Schnell-Feuer Kanone) 66-millimeter (2.6 in) gun]. The gun was mounted on a platform on the forecastle with the turtleback leading right up to it. Their secondary armament included seven 47-millimeter (1.9 in) guns. Two guns were positioned on the main deck right behind the bow gun's mount, four others were located on the deck amidships; all of these guns were on the broadside. The seventh gun was on the stern. All of the guns were fitted with gun shields. The ships were equipped with two 450-millimeter (17.7 in) torpedo tubes in two single, rotating mounts. One of these was located between the forward gun mount and the superstructure while the other was positioned between the aft funnel and the stern gun.

In 1913 the ships exchanged their seven 47 mm (1.9 in) guns for five 30-caliber Škoda 66 mm (2.6 in) guns. These guns replaced the stern and amidships weapons. To save weight, gun shields were not fitted to these guns. Two years later the Huszar's were equipped with an 8-millimeter (0.31 in) Schwarzlose M.7/12 anti-aircraft machine gun. In 1917, the ships were supposed to exchange their 66 mm SFK guns with new K07 guns on anti-aircraft mounts and one 30-caliber gun was supposed to installed in an anti-aircraft mount, but it is uncertain how much of this was actually done.

== Construction and career ==
Wildfang was laid down on 7 December 1905 by Stabilimento Tecnico Triestino at their shipyard in Trieste and launched on 29 August 1906. She was completed on 15 June 1907. The ship struck at least four mines on the morning of 4 June 1917 near the island of Veli Brijun. The mines caused both of her magazines to explode, killing 25 crewmen. The rest of her crew were rescued by the torpedo boat 74 T.

== Bibliography ==
- Cernuschi, Enrico & O'Hara, Vincent (2015). "The Naval War in the Adriatic Part 1: 1914–1916". In Jordan, John (ed.). Warship 2015. London: Conway. pp. 161–173. ISBN 978-1-84486-276-4.
- Cernuschi, Enrico & O'Hara, Vincent (2016). "The Naval War in the Adriatic, Part 2: 1917–1918". In Jordan, John (ed.). Warship 2016. London: Conway. pp. 62–75. ISBN 978-1-84486-326-6.
- Freivogel, Zvonimir (2021). Austro-Hungarian Destroyers in World War One. Despot Infinitus. ISBN 978-953-366-051-6.
- Noppen, Ryan K. (2016). Austro-Hungarian Cruisers and Destroyers 1914-18. New Vanguard. Vol. 241. Osprey Publishing. ISBN 978-1-4728-1470-8.
- O'Hara, Vincent P. & Heinz, Leonard R. (2017). Clash of Fleets: Naval Battles of the Great War, 1914-18. Naval Institute Press. ISBN 978-1-68247-008-4.
- Sieche, Erwin (1985). "Austria-Hungary". In Gardiner, Robert & Gray, Randal (eds.). Conway's All the World's Fighting Ships 1906–1921. Naval Institute Press. ISBN 0-85177-245-5.
