= Korot =

Korot is a surname. Notable people with the surname include:

- Alla Korot (born 1970), Ukrainian-American actress and dancer
- Beryl Korot (born 1945), American artist
