= Ardito-class destroyer =

Class overview
- Operators: Kingdom of Italy
- Preceded by: Indomito class
- Succeeded by: Audace class
- Completed: 2
- Scrapped: 2

General characteristics
- Type: Destroyer
- Displacement: Full load: 790 long tons (800 t)
- Length: 73 m (239 ft 6 in) loa
- Beam: 7.3 m (23 ft 11 in)
- Draft: 2.4 m (7 ft 10 in)
- Installed power: 4 × water-tube boilers; 16,000 shaft horsepower (12,000 kW)
- Propulsion: 2 × steam turbines; 2 × screw propellers
- Speed: 30 knots (56 km/h; 35 mph)
- Range: 1,200 nmi (2,200 km; 1,400 mi) at 14 knots (26 km/h; 16 mph)
- Complement: 5 × officers; 65 × enlisted men
- Armament: 1 × 120 mm (4.7 in) gun; 4 × 76 mm (3 in) guns; 2 × 450 mm (17.7 in) torpedo tubes

The Ardito class of destroyers consisted of two ships—Ardito and Ardente—that were built for the Italian Regia Marina (Royal Navy) in the 1910s.

== Design ==
The ships of the Ardito class were 74.8 m (245 ft 5 in) long at the waterline and 73 m (239 ft 6 in) long overall, with a beam of 7.3 m (23 ft 11 in) and a draft of 2.4 m (7 ft 10 in). They displaced 695 long tons (706 t) standard and up to 790 long tons (800 t) at full load. They had a crew of 4 officers and 65 enlisted men. The ships were powered by two Parsons steam turbines, with steam provided by four Thornycroft water-tube boilers. The engines were rated to produce 16,000 shaft horsepower (12,000 kW) for a top speed of 30 knots (56 km/h; 35 mph), though in service they reached as high as 33.4 knots (61.9 km/h; 38.4 mph) from 15,733 shp (11,732 kW). At a more economical speed of 14 knots (26 km/h; 16 mph), the ships could cruise for 1,200 nautical miles (2,200 km; 1,400 mi).

The ships carried an armament that consisted of a single 120 mm (4.7 in) gun and four 76 mm (3 in) guns, along with two 450 mm (17.7 in) torpedo tubes. The 102 mm gun was placed on the forecastle and two of the 76 mm guns were mounted abreast the funnels, with the remaining pair at the stern. The torpedo tubes were in single mounts, both on the centerline.

== Ships ==
Construction data
Name	Laid down	launched	Completed	Shipyard
Ardito		20 October 1912		Cantiere navale fratelli Orlando, Livorno
Ardente		15 December 1912		Cantiere navale fratelli Orlando, Livorno

== Service history ==
Ardito was struck from the naval register on 2 October 1931 and discarded, while Ardente remained in the navy's inventory until 11 March 1937, when she too was struck and broken up.
