= Huszár-class destroyer =

Class of destroyers in the Austro-Hungarian Navy

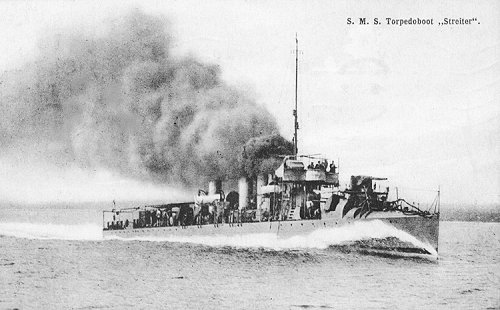
- SMS Streiter

Class overview
- Builders: Yarrow, STT; Ganz-Danubius; Naval Dockyard, Pola
- Operators: Austro-Hungarian Navy; Hellenic Navy
- Succeeded by: Tátra class
- Subclasses: SMS Warasdiner
- Completed: 14
- Lost: 3
- Retired: 11

General characteristics
- Displacement: 400 t (390 long tons) standard; 420 t (410 long tons) deep load
- Length: 68.4 m (224 ft 5 in) oa; 67.1 m (220 ft 2 in) pp
- Beam: 6.25 m (20 ft 6 in)
- Draught: 1.8 m (5 ft 11 in)
- Propulsion: 4× Yarrow boilers, 2× 4-cylinder triple-expansion engines; 2-shafts; 6,000 indicated horsepower (4,500 kW)
- Speed: 28 knots (52 km/h; 32 mph)
- Range: 500 nmi (930 km; 580 mi) at 28 knots (52 km/h; 32 mph)
- Armament: 1× 66 mm (2.6 in)/45 gun, 7× 47 mm (1.9 in) L/44 guns; 2× 45 cm (17.7 in) torpedo tubes

The Huszár class was a class of destroyers built for the Austro-Hungarian Navy before the First World War. They were built to a design by the British shipbuilder Yarrow Shipbuilders, who built the first ship, with a further 11 ships being built in Austrian and Hungarian yards between 1905 and 1909. A replacement ship was built when the lead ship was lost in an accident in 1908, and another ship of similar design building for the Chinese navy was seized on the outbreak of the First World War. Two ships were lost during the war, a single ship serving with the Greek Navy following the end of the war, and the remainder being scrapped.

== Design ==
The Austro-Hungarian Navy had been following foreign developments in torpedo boat destroyer designs and finally decided that it needed a ship of about 400 tonnes (390 long tons). It asked Yarrow Shipbuilders in the UK for a suitable design equivalent to the latest Royal Navy ships on 6 April 1904. The company responded with a modified version of the Ikazuchi class that had been developed by for the Imperial Japanese Navy in the late 1890s. The Austro-Hungarian Navy accepted Yarrow's design and signed a contract for a prototype on 6 August 1904. A prototypes would be built by Yarrow with production continuing in the Austria-Hungary, split between the Stabilimento Tecnico Triestino (STT) shipyard in Trieste, Austria and the Ganz-Danubius yard at Fiume, Hungary.

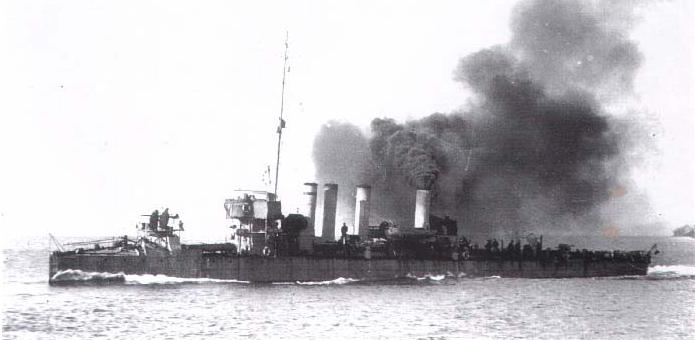
SMS Warasdiner

Yarrow's destroyer design was a "turtleback" design similar to the Royal Navy's "thirty-knotters", and was based on Yarrow's Ikazuchi class built for Japan. The ship's hull was 68.4 metres (224 ft 5 in) long overall and 67.1 metres (220 ft 2 in) between perpendiculars, with a beam of 6.25 metres (20 ft 6 in) and a draught of 1.8 metres (5 ft 11 in). They displaced 400 tonnes (390 long tons) standard and 420 t (410 long tons) deep load.

The ships were powered by two four-cylinder triple expansion steam engines, fed by four Yarrow boilers, rated at 6,000 ihp (4,500 kW), driving two shafts. This gave a speed of 28 knots (52 km/h; 32 mph). Four funnels were fitted. One innovation compared with the Ikazuchis was that the uptake to the forward funnel was trunked rearward, allowing the funnel to be moved aft, in turn making room for the ship's bridge to be situated well aft of the turtleback forecastle. This made the bridge much drier in high seas.

The original armament consisted of a single 66 mm (2.6 in) L/45 Skoda gun (Note: While the gun's actual calibre was 66 mm, it was usually referred to as a 7 cm gun in contemporary literature.) (Note: L/45 refers to the length of the gun's barrel. In this case the barrel was 45 calibres long.) and seven 47 mm (1.9 in) L/44 guns, with two 450 mm (18 in) torpedo tubes, one in the well between the turtleback and the bridge, and one aft. The 47mm guns were later replaced by 66 mm L/40 guns.

== History ==
The first ship, SMS Huszár (Note: "SMS" stands for "Seiner Majestät Schiff ", or "His Majesty's Ship" in German.) was laid down at Yarrow's London shipyard in September 1904, the ship launching on 31 March 1905 and completing on 19 September 1905, reaching 28.16 knots (52.15 km/h; 32.41 mph). Orders were placed for a further 11 ships to be built in Austria-Hungary. While STT was quick to begin work, with its first ship, SMS Ulan being laid down in September 1905, work at the Ganz-Danubius yard at Fiume, which had been awarded a contract for six ships in order to split work between Austria and Hungary, was delayed by the need to construct slips to build the ships, its first ship not being laid down until July 1907. Deliveries to the Austro-Hungarian Navy continued from September 1906 to December 1909.

On 3 December 1908, Huszár ran aground near Traste on the Adriatic coast, the ship sinking on 12 December. A replacement ship, with the same name, was built at the Naval Dockyard, Pola, using armament and other equipment salvaged from the sunken ship. The class was rearmed in 1912–1913, with five 66 mm L/30 guns replacing the 47 mm guns.

In 1912, China placed an order with STT for a single destroyer based on the Huszár class, to be called Lung Tuan, with twelve more ships ordered in 1913. Armament was to consist of two 12-pounder (76 mm) and four 3-pounder (47 mm) guns supplied by Armstrong Whitworth, with two torpedo tubes. Lung Tuan was almost complete when the First World War broke out, and she was seized by Austria-Hungary, and towed to Pola for completion as SMS Warasdiner, being armed with two 66 mm L/45 guns, four 66 mm L/30 guns and four 450 mm torpedo tubes.

Two ships, Streiter and Wildfang were sunk during the war. The Austro-Hungarian Navy was dissolved after the end of the First World War, with its ships being split between the Allied nations. Eight ships were taken over by Italy and two by France in 1920, and were scrapped, while one ship, Ulan, went to Greece, where it served as Smyrni until 1928.

== Ships ==
Ship	Builder	Laid down	Launched	Completed	Operational History
Huszár (1905)	Yarrow Shipbuilders, London	September 1904	31 March 1905	19 September 1905	Ran aground 3 December 1908 and sank 12 December 1908
Ulan	STT, Trieste	27 September 1905	8 April 1906	21 September 1906	Transferred to Greece 1920 as Smyrni; Discarded 1928
Streiter	STT, Trieste	30 October 1905	16 June 1906	31 December 1906	Sank following collision with SS Petka off Lovran, 16 April 1918.
Wildfang	STT, Trieste	7 December 1905	29 August 1906	15 June 1907	Mined off Peneda Island, 4 June 1917.
Scharfschütze	STT, Trieste	12 April 1906	5 December 1906	15 September 1907	To Italy 1920 and scrapped.
Uskoke	STT, Trieste	1 September 1906	20 July 1907	31 December 1907	To Italy 1920 and scrapped.
Huszár (1910)	Naval Dockyard, Pola	29 November 1909	20 December 1910	8 February 1911	To Italy 1920 and scrapped.
Turul	Ganz-Danubius, Fiume	27 July 1907	9 August 1908	31 December 1908	To Italy 1920 and scrapped.
Pandur	Ganz-Danubius, Fiume	2 August 1907	25 October 1908	31 January 1909	To France 1920 and scrapped
Csikós	Ganz-Danubius, Fiume	21 February 1908	24 January 1909	16 November 1909	To Italy 1920 and scrapped.
Reka	Ganz-Danubius, Fiume	13 August 1908	28 April 1909	31 December 1909	To France 1920 and scrapped
Dinara	Ganz-Danubius, Fiume	28 January 1909	16 October 1909	31 December 1909	To Italy 1920 and scrapped.
Velebit	Ganz-Danubius, Fiume	5 November 1908	24 July 1909	31 December 1909	To Italy 1920 and scrapped.
Warasdiner	STT, Trieste	1912	1913	10 September 1914	Built for China as Lung Tuan; Seized by Austria-Hungary 1 August 1914 and completed at Pola; To Italy 1920 and scrapped.
