= Italian ship Carabiniere =

Carabiniere has been borne by at least four ships of the Italian Navy and may refer to:

- Italian destroyer Carabiniere (1909), a Soldato-class destroyer launched in 1909 and stricken in 1925.
- Italian destroyer Carabiniere (1938), a Soldati-class destroyer launched in 1938 and decommissioned in 1965.
- Italian frigate Carabiniere (F 581), an Alpino-class frigate launched in 1967 and decommissioned in 2008.
- Italian frigate Carabiniere (F 593), a Bergamini-class frigate launched in 2014.
