= Signalman =

Communication role

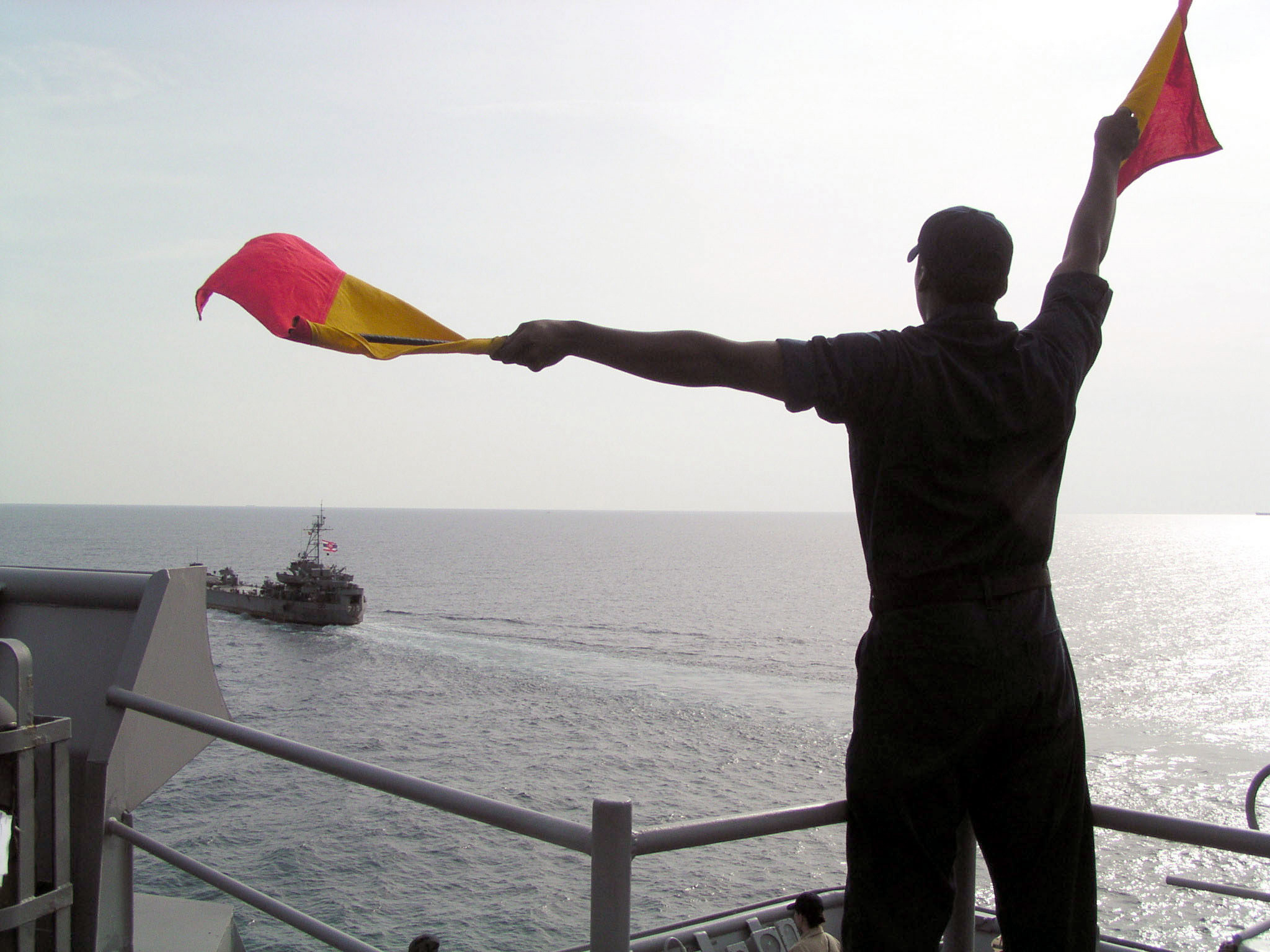
Signalman Seaman practices his semaphore.

A signalman is a rank who makes signals using flags and light. The role has evolved and now usually uses electronic communication equipment. Signalmen usually work in rail transport networks, armed forces, or construction (to direct heavy equipment such as cranes).
