= Škoda 7 cm guns =

Škoda 7 cm G. L/18
- Type: Landing gun
- Place of origin: Austria-Hungary

Service history
- Used by: Austria-Hungary
- Wars: World War I World War II

Production history
- Designer: Škoda
- Manufacturer: Škoda
- Produced: 1895

Specifications
- Mass: Gun: 98 kg (216 lb); Complete: 500 kg (1,100 lb)
- Length: 1.2 m (3 ft 11 in) 18 caliber
- Shell weight: 4 kg (8.8 lb)
- Caliber: 66 mm (2.6 in)
- Breech: Horizontal sliding-wedge breech
- Rate of fire: 20 rpm
- Muzzle velocity: 320 m/s (1,000 ft/s)

Škoda 7 cm G. L/26 K15 BAK
- Type: Dual-purpose gun
- Place of origin: Austria-Hungary

Service history
- Used by: Austria-Hungary
- Wars: World War I World War II

Production history
- Designer: Škoda
- Manufacturer: Škoda
- Produced: 1915

Specifications
- Mass: Gun: 220 kg (490 lb)
- Length: 1.7 m (5 ft 7 in) 26 caliber
- Shell weight: 5.3 kg (12 lb)
- Caliber: 66 mm (2.6 in)
- Breech: Horizontal sliding wedge breech
- Elevation: -10° to +90°
- Traverse: 360°
- Rate of fire: 20 rpm
- Muzzle velocity: 480 m/s (1,600 ft/s)

Škoda 7 cm L/30 K09 BAG
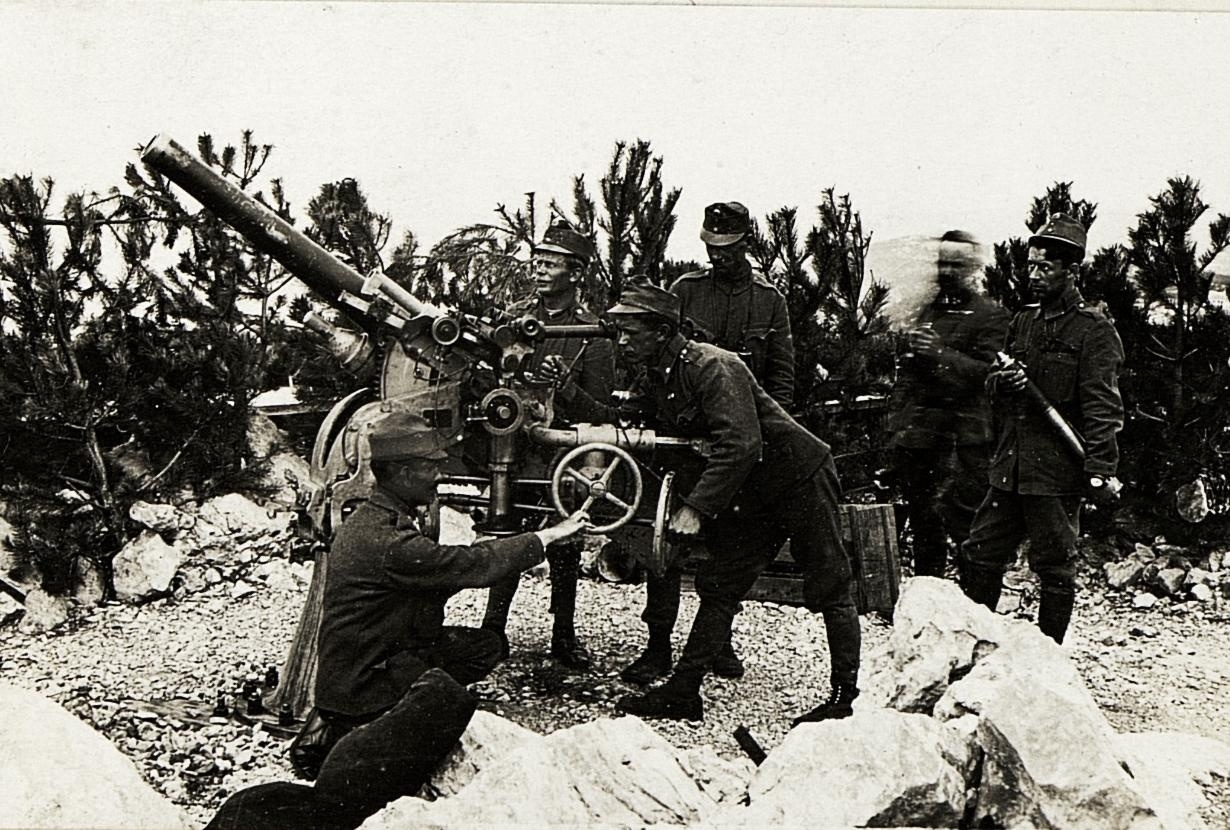
- Type: Dual-purpose gun
- Place of origin: Austria-Hungary

Service history
- Used by: Austria-Hungary
- Wars: World War I World War II

Production history
- Designer: Škoda
- Manufacturer: Škoda
- Produced: 1910

Specifications
- Mass: Gun: 244 kg (538 lb); TAG Complete: 654 kg (1,442 lb); BAG Complete: 954 kg (2,103 lb)
- Length: 1.9 m (6 ft 3 in) 30 caliber
- Shell weight: 4 kg (8.8 lb)
- Caliber: 66 mm (2.6 in)
- Breech: Horizontal sliding wedge breech
- Elevation: -10° to +90°
- Traverse: 360°
- Rate of fire: 20 rpm
- Muzzle velocity: 550 m/s (1,800 ft/s)

Škoda 7 cm SFK L/42
- Type: Dual-purpose gun
- Place of origin: Austria-Hungary

Service history
- Used by: Austria-Hungary
- Wars: World War I World War II

Production history
- Designer: Škoda
- Manufacturer: Škoda
- Produced: 1892

Specifications
- Mass: Gun: 630 kg (1,390 lb); Complete: 1,488 kg (3,280 lb)
- Length: 2.75 m (9 ft 0 in) 42 caliber
- Barrel length: 2.12 m (6 ft 11 in)
- Shell weight: 4 kg (8.8 lb)
- Caliber: 66 mm (2.6 in)
- Breech: Horizontal sliding wedge breech
- Elevation: -10° to +20°
- Traverse: 360°
- Rate of fire: 20 rpm
- Muzzle velocity: 700 m/s (2,300 ft/s)
- Maximum firing range: 6 kilometres (3.7 mi)

Škoda 7 cm SFK L/45
- Type: Naval gun
- Place of origin: Austria-Hungary

Service history
- Used by: Austria-Hungary
- Wars: World War I World War II

Production history
- Designer: Škoda
- Manufacturer: Škoda
- Produced: 1900

Specifications
- Mass: Gun: 547 kg (1,206 lb); Complete: 1,860 kg (4,100 lb)
- Length: 2.9 m (9 ft 6 in) 45 caliber
- Barrel length: 2.2 m (7 ft 3 in)
- Shell weight: 5 kg (11 lb)
- Caliber: 66 mm (2.6 in)
- Breech: Horizontal sliding wedge breech
- Elevation: -10° to +20°
- Traverse: 360°
- Rate of fire: 20 rpm
- Muzzle velocity: 725 m/s (2,380 ft/s)
- Maximum firing range: 6.5 kilometres (4.0 mi)

Škoda 7 cm G. L/45 BAG
- Type: Dual-purpose gun Coastal artillery
- Place of origin: Austria-Hungary

Service history
- Used by: Austria-Hungary
- Wars: World War I World War II

Production history
- Designer: Škoda
- Manufacturer: Škoda
- Produced: 1900

Specifications
- Mass: Gun: 520 kg (1,150 lb)
- Length: 2.9 m (9 ft 6 in) 45 caliber
- Barrel length: 2.2 m (7 ft 3 in)
- Shell weight: 5 kg (11 lb)
- Caliber: 66 mm (2.6 in)
- Breech: Horizontal sliding wedge breech
- Elevation: -10° to +90°
- Traverse: 360°
- Rate of fire: 20 rpm
- Muzzle velocity: 725 m/s (2,380 ft/s)
- Maximum firing range: 5 kilometres (3.1 mi)

The Škoda 7 cm guns were a family of naval guns and dual-purpose guns of the Austro-Hungarian Empire that were developed and produced for the Austro-Hungarian Navy in the years before and during World War I. These guns were actually 66 mm, but the classification system for artillery rounded up to the next highest centimeter. Following the defeat of the Central Powers in World War I and the dissolution of the Austro-Hungarian empire the ships of the Austro-Hungarian Navy were divided among the victorious allies and some guns continued to be used until World War II.

== Construction ==
The Škoda 7 cm guns were developed and built at the Pilsen works between 1892 through 1918. The barrel was made of steel with a horizontal sliding-wedge breech, they used fixed quick fire ammunition and most ranged in length between 26 and 45 calibers. There was a single hydraulic recoil cylinder beneath the barrel and most were aimed by shoulder pads. The G. L/18 was a landing gun which could be taken ashore to provide support for a landing party. Initially these guns were deployed as anti-torpedo boat guns and had an elevation of -10° to +20°. Škoda engineers later developed anti-aircraft mounts which could elevate from -10° to +90°, but the ballistic performance for the guns remained the same.

Acronyms associated with these guns include:

- SFK = Schnell-Feuer Kanone or quick firing cannon.
- TAG = Torpedoboot-Abwehr Geschütz or anti-torpedo boat gun.
- BAG = Ballon-Abwehr Geschütz or anti-balloon gun.
- BAK = Ballon-Abwehr Kanone or anti-balloon cannon.

== History ==
The Škoda 7 cm were mounted aboard coastal defence ships, destroyers, minelayers, monitors, pre-dreadnought battleships, protected cruisers and submarines of the Austro-Hungarian Navy.

=== Coastal defense ships ===
- Monarch-class - SMS Monarch had one G. L/45 BAG gun after a 1917 refit. SMS Wien and SMS Budapest each received a Škoda 7 cm K10 gun for anti-aircraft defense after a 1917 refit.

=== Destroyers ===
- Huszár-class - The fourteen ships of this class had a primary armament of one SFK L/45 gun on a low angle mount. Later all ships received five L/30 K09 BAG guns on dual-purpose mounts after 1912–1913 refits. One of these ships Ulan was ceded to Greece after World War I and was renamed Smyrni.
- Tátra-class - The six ships of this class had a secondary armament of six SFK L/45 guns on low angle mounts. Two of these guns were replaced with dual-purpose G. L/45 BAG guns after 1916-18 refits. Four ships of this class Tatra, Csepel, Orjen and Balaton were ceded to Italy after World War I where they were called the Fasana-class.
- SMS Warasdiner - This ship had a primary armament of two SFK L/45 guns on low angle mounts and four dual-purpose L/30 K09 BAG guns. Warasdiner was ceded to Italy after World War I.

=== Minelayers ===
- MT.130-class - The eight ships of this class had a primary armament of one dual-purpose L/30 K09 BAG gun. After World War I three of the unfinished ships were ceded to Italy and called the Albona-class, while five unfinished ships were ceded to Yugoslavia and called the Malinska-class. After the defeat of Yugoslavia in World War II five ships were seized by Italy and called the Arbe-class.

=== Monitors ===
- Enns-class - The two ships of this class had a tertiary armament of two G. L/26 K16 BAK guns. SMS Inn was ceded to Romania after World War I and was renamed Besarabia. SMS Enns was ceded Yugoslavia and renamed Drava.
- Sava-class - The two ships of this class had a tertiary armament of two G. L/26 K16 BAK guns. Both ships were ceded to Yugoslavia after World War I and SMS Temes (II) was renamed Vardar, while SMS Sava ceded to Romania and renamed Bucovina.
- Körös-class - The two ships of this class had a secondary armament of two SFK L/42 guns. SMS Körös was ceded to Yugoslavia after World War I and renamed Morava.
- Leitha-class - One ship of this class the SMS Leitha received a SFK L/42 gun after a 1915 refit.

=== Pre-dreadnought battleships ===
- Erzherzog Karl-class - The three ships of this class had twelve SFK L/45 guns for anti-torpedo boat defense. Each ship received two G. L/45 BAG guns for anti-aircraft defense after 1916 refits.
- Habsburg-class - The three ships of this class had ten SFK L/45 guns for anti-torpedo boat defense. Each ship received two G. L/45 BAG guns for anti-aircraft defense after 1916-17 refits.

=== Protected cruisers ===
- Kaiser Franz Joseph I-class - The two ships of this class were armed with two G. L/18 landing guns.
- Panther-class - The two ships of this class the SMS Panther and SMS Leopard (1885) received four SFK L/42 guns after 1909-10 refits.

=== Submarines ===
- U3-class - One ship of this class U-4 received one G. L/26 K15 BAK gun after a 1917 refit.
- U20-class - Four ships of this class U-20, U-21, U-22 and U-23 received one G. L/26 K15 BAK gun.

=== Torpedo boats ===
- T-group - The eight ships of this group had a primary armament of two SFK L/45 or two L/30 K09 BAG guns. Four were ceded to Romania and renamed Sborul, Vartejul, Viforul and Vijelia. Four were ceded to Yugoslavia after World War I where they were named T1, T2, T3 and T4. Following the defeat of Yugoslavia in World War II these ships were seized by Germany and Italy.
- F-group - The sixteen ships of this group had a primary armament two L/30 K09 BAG guns. These were ceded to Greece, Portugal, Romania and Yugoslavia after World War I. Greece received Panormos, Pergamos and Proussa. Portugal received Zêzere, Ave, Cávado, Sado, Liz and Mondego. Romania received Năluca, Smeul and Fulgerul. Yugoslavia received T5, T6, T7 and T8.
- M-group - The three ships of this group had a primary armament two L/30 K09 BAG guns. The ships of this group were ceded to Greece and renamed Kydonia, Kios and Kyzikos.

=== Torpedo cruisers ===
- Zara-class - The three ships of this class were armed with two SFK L/45 guns after 1917 refits.

== Ammunition ==
Ammunition was of fixed QF type. A complete round measured 66 x 575R and the projectile weighed between 4–5.3 kg (8.8–11.7 lb).

Ammunition types:

- Steel shells
- Common shells
- Shrapnel

== Weapons of comparable role, performance and era ==
- Canon de 65 mm Modèle 1891: French equivalent
- Škoda 7 cm K10 and K16: Skoda successors to the TAG/BAG/BAK line

== Users ==
- Austria
- Austria-Hungary
- Greece
- Hungary
- Italy
- Portugal
- Romania
- Yugoslavia
