= Italian destroyer Giuseppe Sirtori =

Italian Giuseppe Sirtori-class destroyer

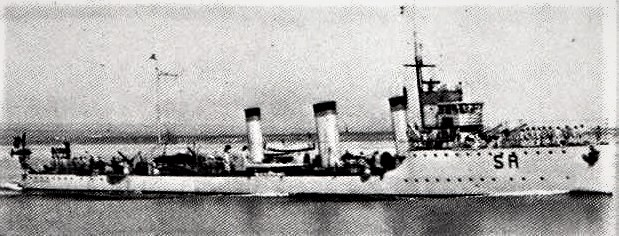
- Giuseppe Sirtori underway sometime between 1917 and 1941.

History

Kingdom of Italy
- Name: Giuseppe Sirtori
- Namesake: Giuseppe Sirtori (1813–1874), Italian patriot, general, and politician
- Laid down: 2 February 1916
- Launched: 24 November 1916
- Commissioned: 22 December 1916
- Reclassified: Torpedo boat 1 October 1929
- Identification: Pennant number SR
- Fate: Scuttled 25 September 1943

General characteristics
- Class & type: Giuseppe Sirtori-class destroyer
- Displacement: 709 t (698 long tons) (normal); 914 t (900 long tons) (deep load)
- Length: 73.54 m (241 ft 3 in) (overall)
- Beam: 7.34 m (24 ft 1 in)
- Draft: 2.7 m (8 ft 10 in) (mean)
- Installed power: 4 × Thornycroft boilers; 15,500 shp (11,558 kW)
- Propulsion: 2 shafts; 2 steam turbines
- Speed: 30 knots (56 km/h; 35 mph)
- Range: 1,700 nmi (3,100 km; 2,000 mi) at 12 knots (22 km/h; 14 mph)
- Complement: 98 officers and men
- Armament: 6 × single 102 mm (4 in) guns; 2 × single 40 mm (1.6 in) AA guns; 2 × twin 450 mm (17.7 in) torpedo tubes; 10 × mines

Giuseppe Sirtori was the lead ship of the Giuseppe Sirtori-class destroyers. Commissioned into service in the Italian Regia Marina (Royal Navy) in 1916, she served during World War I, participating in the Adriatic campaign. During the interwar period, she took part in operations related to the Corfu incident in 1923 and was reclassified as a torpedo boat in 1929. During World War II, she took part in the Mediterranean campaign and later the Adriatic campaign until she was scuttled in 1943.

== Design ==
The ships of the Giuseppe Sirtori class were 72.5 m (237 ft 10 in) long at the waterline and 73.54 metres (241 ft 3 in) long overall, with a beam of 7.34 metres (24 ft 1 in) and a mean draft of 2.7 metres (8 ft 10 in). They displaced 709 tonnes (698 long tons) standard and up to 914 t (900 long tons) at full load. They had a crew of 98 officers and enlisted men. The ships were powered by two steam turbines, with steam provided by four Thornycroft water-tube boilers. The engines were rated to produce 15,500 shaft horsepower (11,558 kW) for a top speed of 30 knots (56 km/h; 35 mph), though in service they reached as high as 33.6 knots (62.2 km/h; 38.7 mph) from around 17,000 shaft horsepower (12,677 kW). At a more economical speed of 15 knots (28 km/h; 17 mph), the ships could cruise for 1,700 nautical miles (3,100 km; 2,000 mi).

Giuseppe Sirtori was armed with a main battery of six 102 mm (4 in) guns. Her light armament consisted of a pair of 40 mm (1.6 in) anti-aircraft guns and two 6.5 mm (0.26 in) machine guns. She was also armed with four 450 mm (17.7 in) torpedo tubes in two twin launchers, one on each side of the ship. The ship also carried 10 naval mines.

== Construction and commissioning ==
Giuseppe Sirtori was laid down at the Cantieri navali Odero (English: Odero Shipyard) in Sestri Ponente, Italy, on 2 February 1916. She was launched on 24 November 1916 and completed and commissioned on 22 December 1916.

== Service history ==
=== World War I ===
==== 1916–1917 ====
World War I was raging when Giuseppe Sirtori entered service. On the night of 13–14 August 1917 she left Venice with the rest of her destroyer squadron (her sister ships Francesco Stocco, Giovanni Acerbi, and Vincenzo Giordano Orsini), another squadron composed of the destroyers Animoso, Ardente, Audace, and Giuseppe Cesare Abba, and a section made up of the destroyers Carabiniere and Pontiere to intercept an Austro-Hungarian Navy force made up of the destroyers Dinara, Reka, Sharfschutze, Streiter, and Velebit and six torpedo boats which had supported an air raid by 32 aircraft against the fortress of Venice which had struck San Giovanni e Paolo Hospital, killing 14 people and injuring around 30 others. Only Vincenzo Giordano Orsini managed to make brief and fleeting contact with the Austro-Hungarian ships before they escaped.

On 28 November 1917, an Austro-Hungarian Navy force consisting of Dinara, Huszar, Reka, Streiter, the destroyers Dikla and Triglav, and the torpedo boats TB 78, TB 79, TB 86, and TB 90 attacked the Italian coast. While Dikla, Huszar, Streiter and the torpedo boats unsuccessfully attacked first Porto Corsini and then Rimini, Dinara, Reka, and Triglav bombarded a railway near the mouth of the Metauro, damaging a train, the railway tracks, and telegraph lines. The Austro-Hungarian ships then reunited and headed back to the main Austro-Hungarian naval base at Pola. Giuseppe Sirtori, Animoso, Ardente, Audace, Francesco Stocco, Giovanni Acerbi, Giuseppe Cesare Abba, Vincenzo Giordano Orsini, the scout cruiser Sparviero, and the destroyers Aquila and Ardito departed Venice and, together with reconnaissance seaplanes, pursued the Austro-Hungarian formation. The seaplanes attacked the Austro-Hungarians without success, and the Italian ships had to give up the chase when they did not sight the Austro-Hungarians until they neared Cape Promontore on the southern coast of Istria, as continuing beyond it would bring them too close to Pola.

==== 1918 ====
On 10 February 1918 Giuseppe Sirtori, Aquila, Ardente, Ardito, Francesco Stocco, and Giovanni Acerbi — and, according to some sources, the motor torpedo boat MAS 18 — steamed to Porto Levante, now a part of Porto Viro, in case they were needed to support an incursion into the harbor at Bakar (known to the Italians as Buccari) by MAS motor torpedo boats. Sources disagree on whether they remained in port or put to sea to operate in distant support, but in any event their intervention was unnecessary. The motor torpedo boats carried out their raid, which became known in Italy as the Beffa di Buccari ("Bakar mockery").

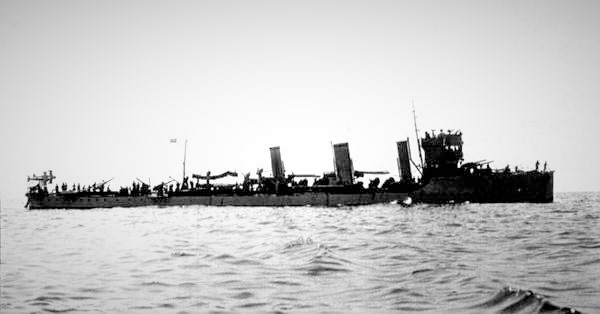
An official photo of Giuseppe Sirtori.

The Regia Marina planned a raid under the command of Capitano di fregata (Frigate Captain) Costanzo Ciano against the Austro-Hungarian Navy base at Pola by the small boat Grillo, but had to abort the raid during attempts on the nights of 8–9 April, 12–13 April, 6–7 May, 9–10 May, and 11–12 May 1918. At 17:30 on 13 March, Giuseppe Sirtori, Animoso, Francesco Stocco, Giovanni Acerbi, Vincenzo Giordano Orsini, the coastal torpedo boats 9 PN and 10 PN, the motor torpedo boats MAS 95 and MAS 96, and Grillo got underway from Venice to attempt the raid again, with the MAS boats towing Grillo. Grillo dropped her tow line at 02:18 on 14 March and began her attempt to penetrate the harbor at Pola. Grillo′s attack, conducted between 03:16 and 03:18, achieved no success and resulted in Grillo′s destruction. Austro-Hungarian searchlights illuminated the MAS boats waiting offshore at 03:35 and again at 03:40, so they withdrew and rejoined the supporting destroyers at 05:00. The Italian force then headed back to port.

On the night of 1–2 July 1918 Giuseppe Sirtori, Audace, Francesco Stocco, Giovanni Acerbi, Vincenzo Giordano Orsini, and the destroyers Giuseppe La Masa and Giuseppe Missori provided distant support to a formation consisting of the torpedo boats Climene and Procione and the coastal torpedo boats 15 OS, 18 OS, 48 OS, 3 PN, 40 PN, 64 PN, 65 PN, and 66 PN. While 15 OS, 18 OS, and 3 PN, towing dummy landing pontoons, staged a simulated amphibious landing to distract Austro-Hungarian troops in support of an Italian advance on the Italian front, 48 OS, 40 PN, 64 PN, 65 PN, and 66 PN bombarded the Austro-Hungarian lines between Cortellazzo and Caorle, proceeding at low speed between the two locations, with Climeme and Procione in direct support. Meanwhile, an Austro-Hungarian force consisting of the destroyers Balaton and Csikós and the torpedo boats TB 83F and TB 88F had put to sea from Pola late on the evening of 1 July to support an Austro-Hungarian air raid on Venice. After an Italian MAS boat made an unsuccessful torpedo attack against Balaton, which was operating with a faulty boiler, at first light on 2 July, the Italian and Austro-Hungarian destroyers sighted one another at 03:10 on 2 July. The Italians opened gunfire on the Austro-Hungarians, who returned fire. During the brief exchange of gunfire that followed, Balaton, in a more advanced position, suffered several shell hits on her forward deck, while Audace, Giuseppe La Masa, and Giuseppe Missori fired on Csikós and the two torpedo boats, scoring a hit on Csikós in her aft boiler room and one hit on each of the torpedo boats. On the Italian side, Francesco Stocco suffered damage which set her on fire and killed and injured some of her crew. While Giovanni Acerbi remained behind to assist Francesco Stocco, the Austro-Hungarians withdrew toward Pola and the Italians resumed operations in support of their own torpedo boats.

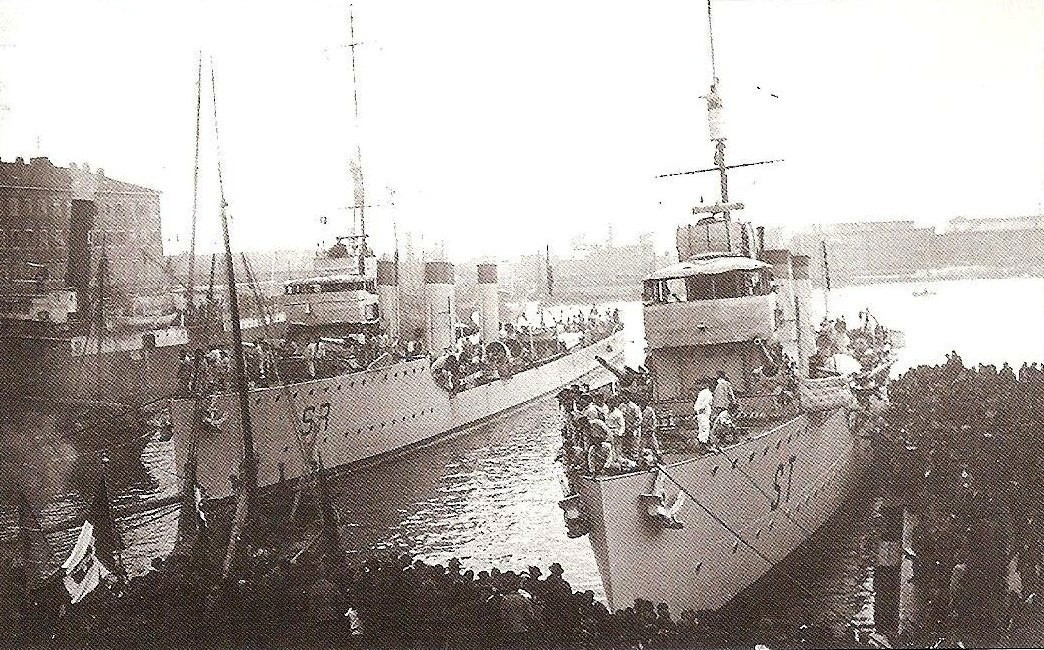
Giuseppe Sirtori (left) and Francesco Stocco (right) arriving at Fiume on 4 November 1918.

By late October 1918, Austria-Hungary had effectively disintegrated, and the Armistice of Villa Giusti, signed on 3 November 1918, went into effect on 4 November 1918 and brought hostilities between Austria-Hungary and the Allies to an end. On the morning of 4 November, Giuseppe Sirtori, Francesco Stocco, Giovanni Acerbi, and Vincenzo Giordano Orsini got underway from Venice with the battleship Emanuele Filiberto, flagship of Contrammiraglio (Counter Admiral) Guglielmo Rainer, in command of the operation, to take possession of Fiume. During the voyage, Giovanni Acerbi and Vincenzo Giordano Orsini were detached, Giovanni Acerbi to call at Volosko (known to the Italians as Volosca) on 4 November and occupy Opatija (known to the Italians as Abbazio), and Vincenzo Giordano Orsini to occupy Lošinj (known to the Italians as Lussino). Avoiding a night crossing of the Kvarner Gulf because of the danger posed by minefields there, the other three ships arrived either before 11:30 or at 14:00, according to different sources, on 4 November at Fiume, where the Italian population of the city welcomed them. The Treaty of London of 1915 had assigned Fiume postwar to Croatia, not to Italy, and the arrival of the three ships began a merely symbolic Italian occupation of the city, without the landing of troops; it was not until 17 November that other Italian ships arrived with troops on board. In the days following her arrival in Fiume, Giuseppe Sirtori also took possession of Pianosa on 8 November, Volosko at 08:00 on 11 November — the day World War I ended with the armistice between Allies and the German Empire — and Krk (known to the Italians as Veglia) on 15 November.

=== Interwar period ===
In 1920 Giuseppe Sirtori underwent modifications which saw the replacement of her six Cannon 102/35 Model 1914 102-millimetre (4 in) guns with six more modern Cannon 102/45 Schneider-Armstrong Model 1917 102-millimetre (4 in) guns.

On 20 August 1923, during the Corfu incident, Giuseppe Sirtori left Taranto, Italy, with Giuseppe La Masa, the battleships Duilio and Andrea Doria, the scout cruiser Augusto Riboty, the destroyers Generale Achille Papa, Generale Antonio Cantore, Generale Antonio Chinotto, and Generale Marcello Prestinari, a minesweeper, and two auxiliary ships. The force proceeded to Portolago on the island of Leros in the Aegean Sea, from which it operated to protect the Italian Dodecanese from possible acts of hostility on the part of the Kingdom of Greece.

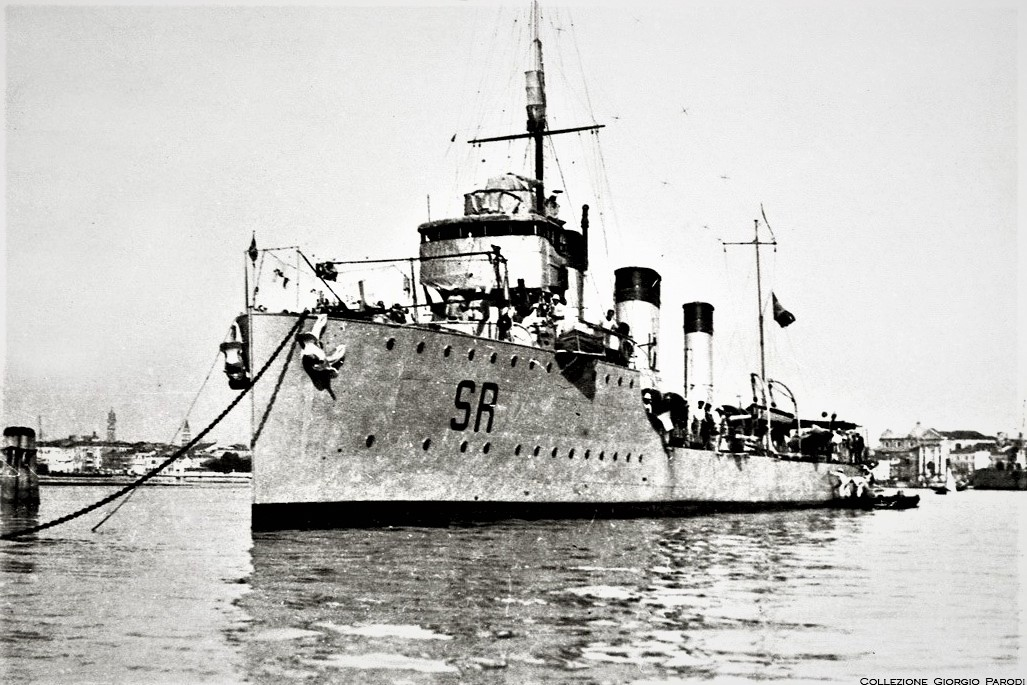
Giuseppe Sirtori sometime between 1930 and 1941.

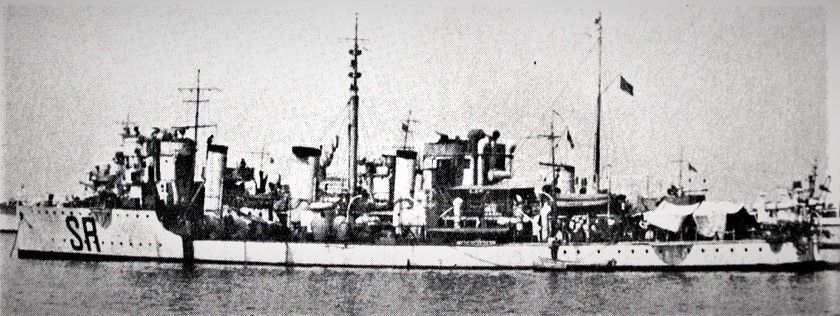
Giuseppe Sirtori sometime between 1930 and 1941.

In 1929 Giuseppe Sirtori, Francesco Stocco, Giovanni Acerbi, and the destroyer Ippolito Nievo formed the 10th Destroyer Squadron, which, along with the five-ship 9th Destroyer Squadron and the scout cruiser Brindisi, formed the Special Division. On 1 October 1929, Giuseppe Sirtoriwas reclassified as a torpedo boat.

In the early 1930s Giuseppe Sirtori served at Taranto as a training ship in the Mechanics School Ships Group. During this period, Capitano di fregata (Frigate Captain) Ignazio Castrogiovanni and Tenente di vascello (Ship-of-the-Line Lieutenant) Francesco Dell'Anno, both future recipients of the Gold Medal of Military Valor, were respectively commanding officer and executive officer of the ship.

=== World War II ===
==== 1940–1941 ====
World War II broke out in September 1939 with Nazi Germany's invasion of Poland. Italy joined the war on the side of the Axis powers with its invasion of France on 10 June 1940. At the time, Giuseppe Sirtori was part of the 6th Torpedo Boat Squadron along with Francesco Stocco, Giuseppe Missori, and the torpedo boat Rosolino Pilo. She was assigned to escort duty and antisubmarine patrols. Subsequently she was deployed to Tripoli, Libya, from which she engaged in convoy escort, antisubmarine patrol, and search-and-rescue operations.

The "Ernesto" convoy, composed of the steamers Aquitania, Castelverde, Ernesto, Nirvo, and Nita and the gunboat Palmaiola, departed Tripoli bound for Naples, Italy, at 07:00 on 27 July 1941 with the direct escort of the destroyers Alpino, Folgore, Fuciliere, and Saetta and distant cover provided by the light cruisers Giuseppe Garibaldi and Raimondo Montecuccoli and the destroyers Bersagliere and Granatiere. At 18:15 on 28 July, the destroyer Fulmine joined the direct escort. At 19:55 on 28 July, the British submarine HMS Upholder attacked the distant cover force, torpedoing Giuseppe Garibaldi northwest of Sicily at 38°04′N 011°57′E, and at 20:20 Alpino and Fuciliere were detached from the convoy escort to protect the badly damaged cruiser, which arrived at Palermo, Sicily, at 06:30 on 29 July. The departure of Alpino and Fuciliere greatly depleted the direct escort force assigned to the convoy, so Giuseppe Sirtori received orders to reinforce the convoy's escort and rendezvoused with the convoy on 29 July. At 15:53 on 29 July, the Royal Netherlands Navy submarine O 21 attacked the convoy in the Tyrrhenian Sea, launching a torpedo at 39°51′N 013°46′E. The attack was unsuccessful — the escorts did not even notice the torpedo — and the convoy reached Naples at 03:10 on 30 July.

On 17 August 1941 Giuseppe Sirtori left Naples at 00:30 with the destroyers Dardo, Euro, and Freccia and the torpedo boats Pegaso and Procione to escort a convoy made up of the merchant ships Caffaro, Giulia, Maddalena Odero, Marin Sanudo, Minatitlan, and Nicolò Odero to Tripoli. Between 20:45 and 21:00 that day, the Royal Netherlands Navy submarine O 23 torpedoed Maddalena Odero in the central Mediterranean Sea south of Sicily, 17 nautical miles (31 km; 20 mi) south of Lampione. Pegaso took Maddalena Odero under tow and headed for Lampedusa, escorted by Giuseppe Sirtori. At 07:00 on 18 August Maddalena Odero was beached at Cala Croce on Lampedusa, but at 13:30 that day five British Royal Air Force Bristol Blenheim bombers of No. 105 Squadron attacked Maddalena Odero and set her on fire. Loaded with ammunition, she exploded, sinking the Guardia di Finanza gunboat Maggiore Macchi, which was providing assistance to her. The rest of the convoy arrived at Tripoli at 17:30 on 19 August.

On 5 December 1941 Giuseppe Sirtori was escorting the steamers Tigrai and Vertuno when the British submarine HMS Ultimatum attacked the convoy in the eastern approaches to the Strait of Messina at 37°48′N 016°05′E, firing three torpedoes. The attack was unsuccessful. On 13 December 1941, Giuseppe Sirtori joined the torpedo boat Cigno and four MAS motor torpedo boats in rescuing 645 survivors of the light cruisers Alberico da Barbiano and Alberto di Giussano, sunk earlier that day by British destroyers in the Battle of Cape Bon off Cape Bon, Tunisia, while attempting to transport fuel from Palermo to Tripoli.

==== 1942 ====
On 5 March 1942 Giuseppe Sirtori, the destroyer Sebenico, and the torpedo boat San Martino escorted the steamers Goggiam and Leonardo Palomba from Corfu to Patras, Greece. Subsequently, Giuseppe Sirtori underwent modernization which included the removal of two 102-millimetre (4 in)/45 guns and the installation of two depth charge tracks.

On 3 September 1942 Giuseppe Sirtori took in tow the motor ship Monti, torpedoed the previous day 3 nautical miles (5.6 km; 3.5 mi) bearing 090º from Roccella Ionica while operating on the Messina–Crotone route, and beached her near the Fiumara Condoiani at Sant'Ilario dello Ionio, allowing her to be salvaged.

On 17 October 1942, Giuseppe Sirtori left Naples at 04:10 with the destroyers Maestrale and Grecale and the torpedo boat Giuseppe Dezza to escort the tanker Panuco to Tripoli. On 18 October the British submarine HMS Una unsuccessfully attacked Panuco north of Catania, Sicily, with torpedoes, and later the ships came under attack by Allied aircraft, prompting the convoy to divert to Taranto, where it arrived at 02:00 on 20 October.

With the fall of Italian Libya to Allied forces in the North African campaign, Axis shipping from Italy was rerouted to Axis-occupied French Tunisia, During a two-day voyage to Tunisia on 13 and 14 November 1942 under escort by Giuseppe Sirtori, the steamer Savigliano became the first ship to be attacked on the new routes. Savigliano was attacked twice by Allied submarines during the voyage, emerging unscathed both times.

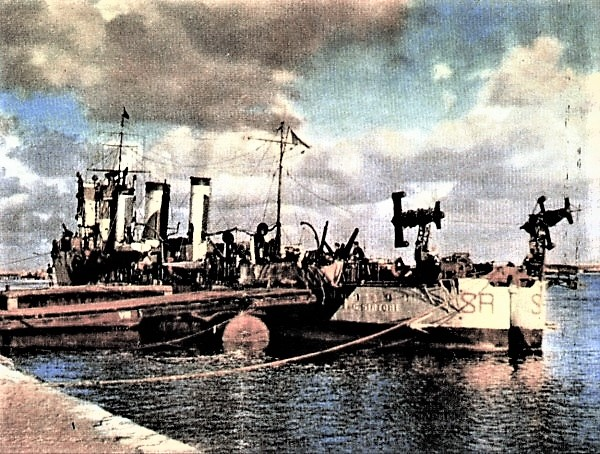
Giuseppe Sirtori painted in a camouflage patterm sometime in 1942 or 1943.

At 10:40 on 16 December 1942 Giuseppe Sirtori left Bizerte, Tunisia, with the torpedo boat Groppo to escort the steamers Campania and Rhea to Naples. At 17:30 that day, the British submarine HMS United unsuccessfully attacked the convoy about 40 nautical miles (74 km; 46 mi) north of Cape Bon, and the convoy reached Naples unscathed at 20:30 on 17 November.

==== 1943 ====
In 1943 Giuseppe Sirtori was assigned to the 3rd Torpedo Boat Group in the Ionian and Lower Adriatic Maritime Military Department along with Francesco Stocco, Giuseppe Cesare Abba, Giuseppe Dezza, Giuseppe Missori, and the torpedo boat Enrico Cosenz.

On 27 June 1943, Giuseppe Sirtori, Francesco Stocco, and the auxiliary cruiser Rovigno escorted the steamers Campidoglio, Milano, and Quirinale from Patras, Greece, to Brindisi, Italy, and on 30 June Giuseppe Sirtori and Rovigno escorted the steamers Ezilda Croce and Giorgio Brunner in navigation from Bari, Italy, to Corfu and then on to Patras. On 13 July 1943 Giuseppe Sirtori escorted the steamer Cesco from Bari to Vlorë (known to the Italians as Valona) in the Italian protectorate of Albania.

==== Loss ====
On 8 September 1943, the Kingdom of Italy announced an armistice with the Allies, prompting Nazi Germany to begin Operation Achse, the disarmament by force of the Italian armed forces and the occupation of those portions of Italy not yet under Allied control. On 13 September, Giuseppe Sirtori and Francesco Stocco were sent to Corfu to support the Italian garrison of the island in defending it from German attacks. Both the city of Corfu and the island as a whole were under continuous attack by aircraft of the German Luftwaffe, and on 14 September German Junkers Ju 87 Stuka dive bombers hit Giuseppe Sirtori, so heavily damaging her that her crew beached her at Potamos on the coast of Corfu. Her crew later refloated her and took her out into the Straits of Corfu, where they used explosive charges to scuttle her on 25 September 1943 to prevent her capture by German forces.
