= Fulmine =

Fulmine may refer to:

- Fulmine, the Italian word for "lightning" or "thunderbolt"
- Fúlmine, a 1949 Argentinian film
- Dick Fulmine, the title character of a comic book series
- Italian ship Fulmine, various Italian naval ships

== See also ==
- Colpo di fulmine (disambiguation)
