= Coup de foudre =

Coup de foudre may refer to:

- Coup de foudre (English: "lightning strike"), a French idiom meaning love at first sight
- Entre Nous (film) (also known as Coup de foudre), a 1983 French biographical drama film
- "Coup de foudre", an episode of the television series LoliRock
- Le Coup de Foudre, a Chinese romantic comedy television series

== See also ==
- Colpo di fulmine (disambiguation)
- Foudre (disambiguation)
