= Giuseppe Sirtori-class destroyer =

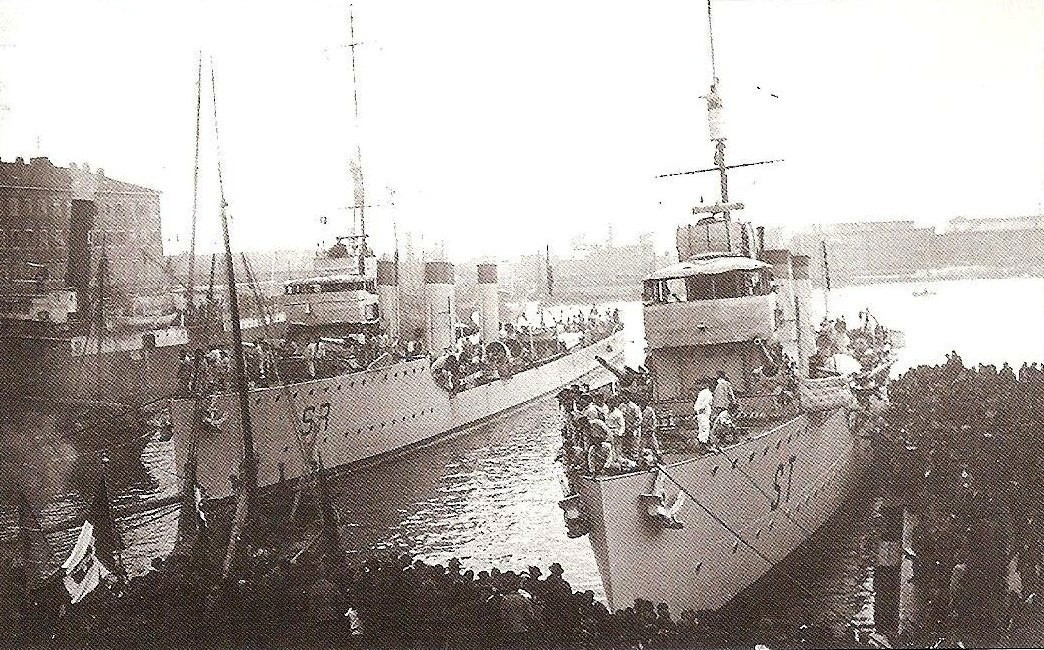
- Sirtori and Stocco at Fiume, 4 November 1918

Class overview
- Name: Giuseppe Sirtori
- Builders: Odero, Genoa-Sestri Ponente
- Operators: Regia Marina
- Preceded by: Audace
- Succeeded by: La Masa class
- Built: 1916–1917
- In commission: 1917–1943
- Planned: 4
- Completed: 4
- Lost: 4

General characteristics (as built)
- Type: Destroyer
- Displacement: 709 t (698 long tons) (normal); 914 t (900 long tons) (deep load)
- Length: 73.54 m (241 ft 3 in) (o/a)
- Beam: 7.34 m (24 ft 1 in)
- Draught: 2.7 m (8 ft 10 in) (mean)
- Installed power: 4 × Thornycroft boilers; 15,500 shp (11,600 kW)
- Propulsion: 2 shafts; 2 steam turbines
- Speed: 30 knots (56 km/h; 35 mph)
- Range: 1,700 nmi (3,100 km; 2,000 mi) at 12 knots (22 km/h; 14 mph)
- Complement: 98 officers and men
- Armament: 6 × single 102 mm (4 in) guns; 2 × single 40 mm (1.6 in) AA guns; 2 × twin 450 mm (17.7 in) torpedo tubes; 10 × mines

The Giuseppe Sirtori class consisted of four destroyers built for the Italian Regia Marina (Royal Navy) during World War I. All four ships saw action during the war, survived the post-war reduction in Italian naval strength, and were lost during World War II.

== Design and description ==
The ships were designed as slightly improved versions of the preceding Pilo class. They had an overall length of 73.54 meters (241 ft 3 in), a beam of 7.34 meters (24 ft 1 in) and a mean draft of 2.7 meters (8 ft 10 in). They displaced 709 tonnes (698 long tons) at standard load, and 914 tonnes (900 long tons) at deep load. Their crew consisted of 98 officers and enlisted men.

The Giuseppe Sirtoris were powered by two Tosi steam turbines, each driving one propeller shaft using steam supplied by four Thornycroft boilers. The turbines were rated at 15,500 shaft horsepower (11,600 kW) for a speed of 30 knots (56 km/h; 35 mph), but could reach 33.6 knots (62.2 km/h; 38.7 mph) from 17,000 shp (13,000 kW). The ships carried 152 t (150 long tons) of fuel oil which gave them a range of 1,700 nautical miles (3,100 km; 2,000 mi) at a speed of 15 knots (28 km/h; 17 mph).

== Ships in class ==
- Giuseppe Sirtori
- Giovanni Acerbi
- Vincenzo Giordano Orsini
- Francesco Stocco
