= LoliRock =

French animated television series

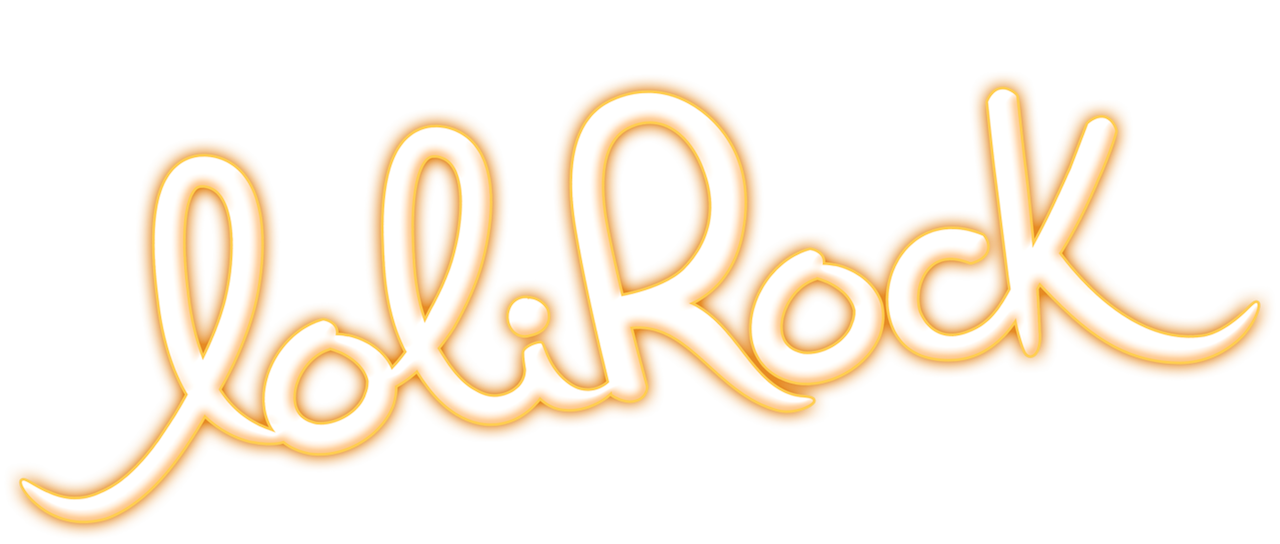
- Genre: Fantasy; Music; Magical girl; Romance
- Created by: David Michel; Jean-Louis Vandestoc
- Written by: Madellaine Paxson
- Directed by: Jean Louis-Vandestoc
- Voices of: French; Lisa Caruso; Kelly Marot; Léopoldine Serre; Gilles Morvan; Karine Foviau; Nessym Guetat; Hugo Brunswick; English; Kazumi Evans; Ashleigh Ball; Tabitha St. Germain; Kelly Sheridan; Vincent Tong; Mackenzie Gray; Matt Ellis
- Theme music composer: Norbert Gilbert
- Opening theme: "Higher" by Yasmin Shah (English); "Rêve Idéal" by Cassandre Berger (French)
- Ending theme: Instrumental of opening theme
- Composer: Norbert Gilbert
- Country of origin: France
- Original languages: French; English
- No. of seasons: 3
- No. of episodes: 78 (list of episodes)

Production
- Executive producers: Vincent Chalvon-Demersay; David Michel; Eryk Casemiro; Benoit Runel (S2)
- Producer: Jean Louis Vandestoc
- Animator: Inspidea
- Editor: Romain Fuzeau
- Running time: 22 minutes
- Production companies: Marathon Media; Zodiak Kids; MFP; B Media 2012 (S2); Backup Films (S2)

Original release
- Network: France 3 Disney Channel
- Release: 18 October 2014 – present

LoliRock is a French animated television series produced by Marathon Media and Zodiak Kids with the participation of France Télévisions and The Walt Disney Company France. It was created by Jean Louis-Vandestoc along with David Michel and written by Madellaine Paxson. It first aired in France on 18 October 2014 on France 3, and has expanded to television channels in Europe.

A unique take on magical girls, the series focuses on a group of teenagers who live double lives as both idol singers and princesses, the latter of whom uses magical powers to fight against an ever growing threat.

== Plot ==
Iris is a teenage girl who loves to sing and help others. However, when she sings, strange things happen. Encouraged by her best friend/crush Nathaniel, Iris auditions for a girl group, but ends up destroying the room and is later attacked by two strangers (magical twins Praxina and Mephisto). The judges at the audition, Princess Talia and Princess Auriana, come to help her and they explain to her that she is a princess herself with mighty magical powers who must save her home world and kingdom of Ephedia, from the evil clutches of Lord Gramorr, who has taken it over and turned it to a miserable place. The only way to save her kingdom is to master her new powers and to find the twelve Oracle Gems of the Crown of Ephedia, which have been scattered across the Earth. Throughout the series, the three girls try to live as both ordinary teenagers as well as stars of the all-female band called LoliRock while training Princess Iris to master her growing magical abilities and spells in secret, and gathering the thirteen mystical oracle gems. But when Gramorr sends Praxina and Mephisto to also find the Oracle Gems while making attempts to destroy the LoliRock with their monsters.

In season two, the group is joined by two other Ephedian princesses named Carissa and Lyna who were part of the planet's resistance, with Talia's elder sister Izira as the leader. They also transform into magical warrior princesses but are not part of the music group. The girls continue gathering Oracle Gems while helping those in need, but Lord Gramorr and the Twins continue to get much stronger and more dangerous as well.

When the last oracle gem is collected, Iris faces the reality of having to say goodbye to Earth, particularly Nathaniel, and returning to Ephedia to be reunited with her parents, the king and queen. But when Lord Gramorr claims the final gem and is released to unleash his destructive wrath on all of Ephedia, the girls work together to face him in one final battle. A highly evolved Princess Iris (who has called upon her stronger Shanila form) destroys Lord Gramorr, whose pet black panther Banes abandons him to his death. Banes later approaches Praxina, embittered over Mephisto sacrificing himself to protect her, and gives her what remained of Gramorr's mask so they enact revenge on LoliRock by attacking Earth, forcing LoliRock to return to Earth to undermine their criminal activities under the guidance of Iris' freed parents.

== Episodes ==
Series	Episodes	Originally released	
Series	Episodes	First released	Last released
1	26	18 October 2014	29 April 2016
2	26	14 February 2017	2 March 2017
3	26	2028	TBD

== Characters ==
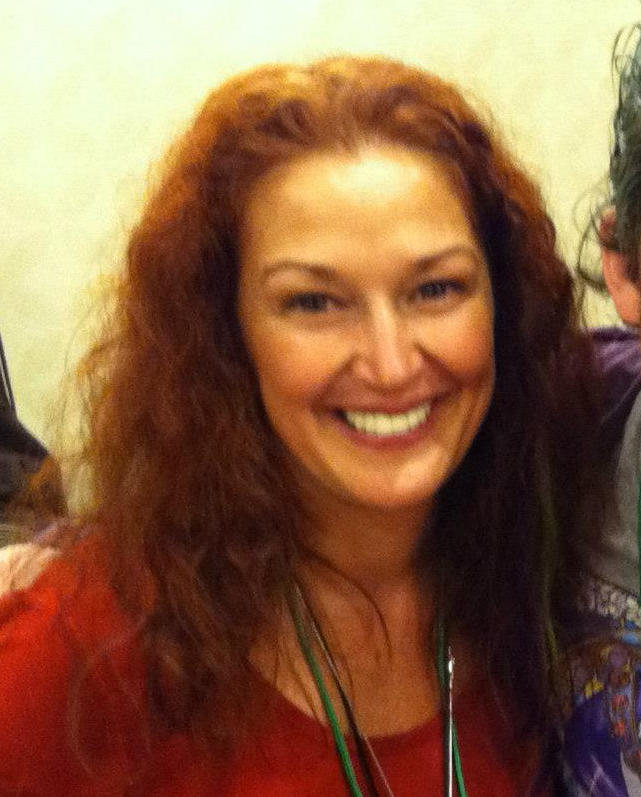
Tabitha St. Germain voiced several of the key characters in LoliRock including Auriana, Amaru, Aunt Ellen, and Carissa

- Iris (voiced by Kazumi Evans) – The lead singer of LoliRock, Iris is a 15-year-old (Note: The ages for the other characters are listed at the LoliRock production Tumblr: Team LoliRock (8 April 2016). "Team LoliRock – I always wonder how old is izira, mephisto,..." Tumblr. Archived from the original on 24 April 2017.) girl living in Sunny Bay; she has wavy blonde hair, fair skin, light blue eyes, pink lips and freckles. She is kind-hearted, selfless and willing to help everyone. Her singing seems to enchant everything around her; this power is coveted by Gramorr. She has a crush on her childhood friend, Nathaniel. After she meets Talia and Auriana, she discovers that she is the crown princess of Ephedia, a magical kingdom, and her duty is to find all the Oracle Gems of the Royal Crown and to reclaim the throne of all of Ephedia. When she transforms using a pink heart-shaped pendant, her hair turns bright rose pink and her clothes turn pink, and she has a heart symbol and a four-pointed star symbol. On Tumblr, the series' producers have stated that she has two symbols because she is of the royal family which rules the entire planet and are of a higher royal status than the other five realms of Xeris, Volta, Calix, and Borealis.
  Character designer Bertrand Todesco initially considered Iris as having dark hair that would change to blonde in the transformation, but found that to be a cliché. Iris was based on actress Taylor Momsen from Gossip Girl, and her wardrobe was based on a picture of Blake Lively, also from Gossip Girl, in a green dress, as well as pop and girly colors like those of Katy Perry and Pixie Lott.
- Talia (voiced by Ashleigh Ball) – She sings backup vocals and plays the keytar and sometimes guitar in LoliRock. She has long dark brown hair with straight bangs, dark skin, and amber eyes. She is serious, aloof, and intelligent. As the second princess of Xeris, she was imprisoned by Gramorr before going on the search for the princess of Ephedia with the help of Auriana. Her transformation item is a bracelet; her hair turns light blue and her clothes become blue. Her symbol is the diamond.
  Talia's character references were French fashion blogger Betty Autier and her wardrobe, Amber Stevens West's portrayal of Ashleigh Owens in the TV series Greek, and singers Keri Hilson and Alicia Keys.
- Auriana (voiced by Tabitha St. Germain) – She sings backup vocals and plays tambourine in LoliRock. She has waist-length cherry red hair styled in a ponytail, tan skin, and green eyes. She is bubbly, optimistic, boy-crazy, and a bit air-headed, but a reliable friend. She is the princess of Volta. Her transformation item is a ring; her hair and clothes turn bright orange, and she sports a longer ponytail. Her symbol is a Crescent moon.
  Todesco wrote that during the show's development, Auriana was originally going to be named Aurora and that he had pictured her as a black girl with a huge volume of hair. He wrote that Auriana was "all the other cool things I like and I couldn't put on Iris and/or Talia." Auriana's character references were Blair Waldorf (played by Leighton Meester) from Gossip Girl and Cat Valentine (played by Ariana Grande) from the teen sitcom Victorious. He said that the name choice was a coincidence.
- Amaru (vocalisations by Tabitha St. Germain) – A purple and white furry creature with dark blue hair and a fluffy little tail. He has the ability to transform into a winged horse and to transport the princesses and their enemies to a special arena to allow the princesses to fight evil away from any civilians. Todesco created Amaru out of the magical girl concept of having pets such as with Sailor Moon having a cat, and that Amaru would be able to transform into a keyring plush on her bag.
- Lord Gramorr (voiced by Mackenzie Gray) – The Grand Wizard of Chaos who is the series' main antagonist. He has green-blond waist-length hair and purple eyes, wears a crown as well as a mask that covers his eyes, nose and mouth entirely. After betraying the king and queen, Gramorr has taken control of Ephedia. However, to gain total control of the kingdom, he must have the royal crown, which is protected by a spell. He is thus unable to leave the castle area and must rely on Praxina and Mephisto to do his work. He has a black panther minion named Banes, which is described by the production Tumblr as the anti-Amaru, and was created to give Gramorr more presence. In early promotions for the series, Gramorr was named Gromar and he was depicted as Iris's evil uncle who imprisoned the king and queen, and had sent his two evil twin nephews to Earth to thwart LoliRock and take the gems, but the idea was scrapped as it would have made him more of a stereotype.
- Praxina (voiced by Kelly Sheridan) – She has long burgundy-colored hair that typically covers one of her eyes. She loves to belittle people, especially her enemies and her fraternal twin brother Mephisto, the latter of whom she reminds that she was born earlier. She has a very affirmed personality and often bosses her brother around. Her theme colour is red. Her attacks tend to be demonstrations of raw power with explosions and large summoned monsters.
  In early concepts of the series, Praxina and Mephisto were considered the two evil twin nephews of Lord Gramorr. Todesco began designing the twins on Halloween 2011 and originally designed Praxina dressed in black-and-white with a X symbol in her eyes. His character designer partner Benedicte Claravino went with a night butterfly/moth concept, with a bun hairstyle that extended to long twin tails. Her eyes became butterflies instead of X's, of which the butterfly brooch stayed with around. Her design was originally approved, but then the producers thought she looked too scary, so Todesco and Benedicte redrew her and came out with a more suitable design. The production Tumblr describes Praxina as an "anti-Iris", so she was given two symbols: lightning for her magic, and butterflies for herself.
- Mephisto (voiced by Vincent Tong) – He and his fraternal twin sister Praxina are sent to Earth by Gramorr to prevent the princesses from thwarting his master's plans at any price. He has short burgundy-coloured hair. He enjoys destroying things, but sometimes acts cheesy, incompetent, and has a short attention span. His theme colour is green. Of the two, Mephisto prefers elaborate spells and tricks and bragging about how he's a genius.
  He originally had a black-and-white motif along with + symbols in his eyes. Like Praxina, he had a butterfly motif, but it was rejected. Director Jean-Louis Vandestoc then suggested a snake symbol and a half-hidden face. Mephisto's design was eventually approved without the hidden face part.
- Nathaniel (voiced by Matt Ellis) – Iris's childhood best friend. He has short cocoa-brown spiky hair. He knows Iris at heart, and often encourages her with kindness and a little humor. He and Iris harbour crushes on each other. Nathaniel works at the smoothie shop the girls frequent. In early promotions for the series back in 2013, Senior VP Patricia de Wilde described Nathaniel with the later scrapped concept of him already being Iris's boyfriend as well as the only outsider that would know of the band's secret.
- Aunt Ellen (voiced by Tabitha St. Germain) – Iris's adoptive guardian, who has taken care of her since she was a baby. She is a cheerful lady who likes to take care of her garden. In the start of the series, she takes in Talia and Auriana as exchange students. In the season 2 episode "Truth Be Told", it is revealed that her real name is Lady Ellira, an Ephedian warrior and bodyguard to Iris's parents, the king and queen, who is tasked with raising their infant daughter and protecting her on Earth from Lord Gramorr.
- Doug (voiced by James Kirk) – He has blond hair and typically wears a brown fedora with a pink band. He debuts in episode 13, "Batty". He is LoliRock's number-one fan and writes a blog about them, gushing over different things and happenings about them. Doug can be gullible sometimes due to his innocence.
- Missy Robins (voiced by Ashleigh Ball) – Iris's childhood rival who debuts in episode 2 "Flower Power". She has greyish-black hair and yellow-green eyes. As the daughter of the mayor of Sunny Bay, she acts spoiled and vain. When asked whether Missy was based on the rival character Mandy from Totally Spies!, the production Tumblr wrote that Missy was not based on her, even though she looks like her. They wanted a character that would be a love rival and a pest, and went with a brunette hair colour to contrast Iris being a blonde, calling it a "classic trope".
- Izira (voiced by Chiara Zanni) – Talia's older sister from the Ephedian kingdom of Xeris. She possesses a great mystical power, and is deemed to be a powerful, responsible and intelligent princess. Talia lost track of her since the attack of Lord Gramorr on Xeris. It is later revealed that she was imprisoned in the prison fortress Krozak on Ephedia. In the show, she first appears in "Xeris". She has white hair, dark skin, and purple eyes. She returns in the season 1 finale episode "Home", where she leads a resistance movement against Gramorr. The production Tumblr revealed that she is nine years older than Talia, and her design was based mainly on imagining what Talia would look like in the future. To distinguish her from Talia, she was designed with a slightly darker skin tone and lighter hair. Her symbol is three diamonds.
- Lev (voiced by Sam Vincent) – An Ephedian thief who initially appears as a fellow prisoner of Gramorr in the season 1 finale episodes and goes with Iris when they try to escape from their cells. However, it is soon revealed that he has been working for Gramorr all along (as he was the highest bidder) to get her to release the crown. He returns in the season 2 episodes "Stop in the Name of Lev", where he goes to Earth and convinces Iris to come back with him to Ephedia to visit her supposedly free king, but this turns out to be another trick to send her to Gramorr. However, Lev has a genuine change of heart at the last minute, seemingly sacrificing himself so LoliRock can escape Gramorr's clutches. His magic crest bears the symbol of an eagle.
- Lyna (voiced by Kelly Sheridan) – A princess of Borealis, who debuts in "Home, Part I". She moved to the town from New York. In her magical princess state, she has light green hair. She is shy, but brave, light-hearted, and sophisticated. She loves crystal tea and is proud that her castle had won awards for being the most beautiful. She and Carissa helped free Izira from Gramorr and joined her resistance movement. Her transformation item is a hair pin, and her symbol is a fleur-de-lys. Her weapon is a chakram (ring), but she prefers to use levitation in her spells. At the end of the first season, she joins the LoliRock girls on Earth where she takes on a civilian appearance of long straight black hair, tan skin, and dark purple eyes. As with Carissa, she is neither part of the band nor lives with them at Aunt Ellen's, but appears in some of the episodes. Lyna's transformation sequence was inspired by Sailor Moon, specifically and Sailor Neptune's. Her colour theme is teal green. According to the character designers, Lyna was depicted as snooty and delicate. During the development of Carissa and Lyna's characters, the designers wanted to make one of them styled like an East Asian princess, and settled with Lyna, while the original European design of Lyna was used for the guest character Debra in season 2.
- Carissa (voiced by Tabitha St. Germain) – A princess of Calix, who also debuts in "Home, Part I". She also moved to the town from New York. In her magical princess state, she has purple hair, and purple is also her general colour theme. She likes to show off her fighting skills, enjoys having bruises, and is fired up whenever she's fighting. After she and Lyna free Izira, she joins the latter's resistance movement. Her transformation item is an armlet and her symbol is a compass rose. Her weapon is a pair of clubs, and she prefers close-quarters combat. At the end of the first season, she joins the LoliRock girls on Earth, where she has dark orange hair styled in a fishtail braid, light skin and blue eyes. Storyboarder Christelle Abgrall wrote that Carissa's transformation was inspired by Sailor Uranus and her main attack. The character designers depicted Carissa as a fiery tomboy. Carissa's hair was brown in some early concepts, and some of the drafts had also depicted her with dark skin or styled like an East Asian princess.

== Production ==
=== Conception ===
Jean-Louis Vandestoc drew inspiration for LoliRock from watching anime in his childhood that was broadcast on French TV channels, including Sherlock Hound, Space Adventure Cobra, The Mysterious Cities of Gold and Dragon Ball, but the most influential anime was Magical Princess Minky Momo. He wrote "I loved the very core of it: a child transforming into an adult, helping people and making good deeds, the nice chara design, and finally the tone of the show: it could be funny and light, but also dramatic and tearful at other times. My soul was marked forever." After working on French cartoons Monster Buster Club and Rekkit Rabbit, he wanted to make a magical girl show. He chose Sailor Moon, Wedding Peach and Pretty Cure as references for the magical girl part, and Jem and the Holograms for the music career part.

=== Character design ===
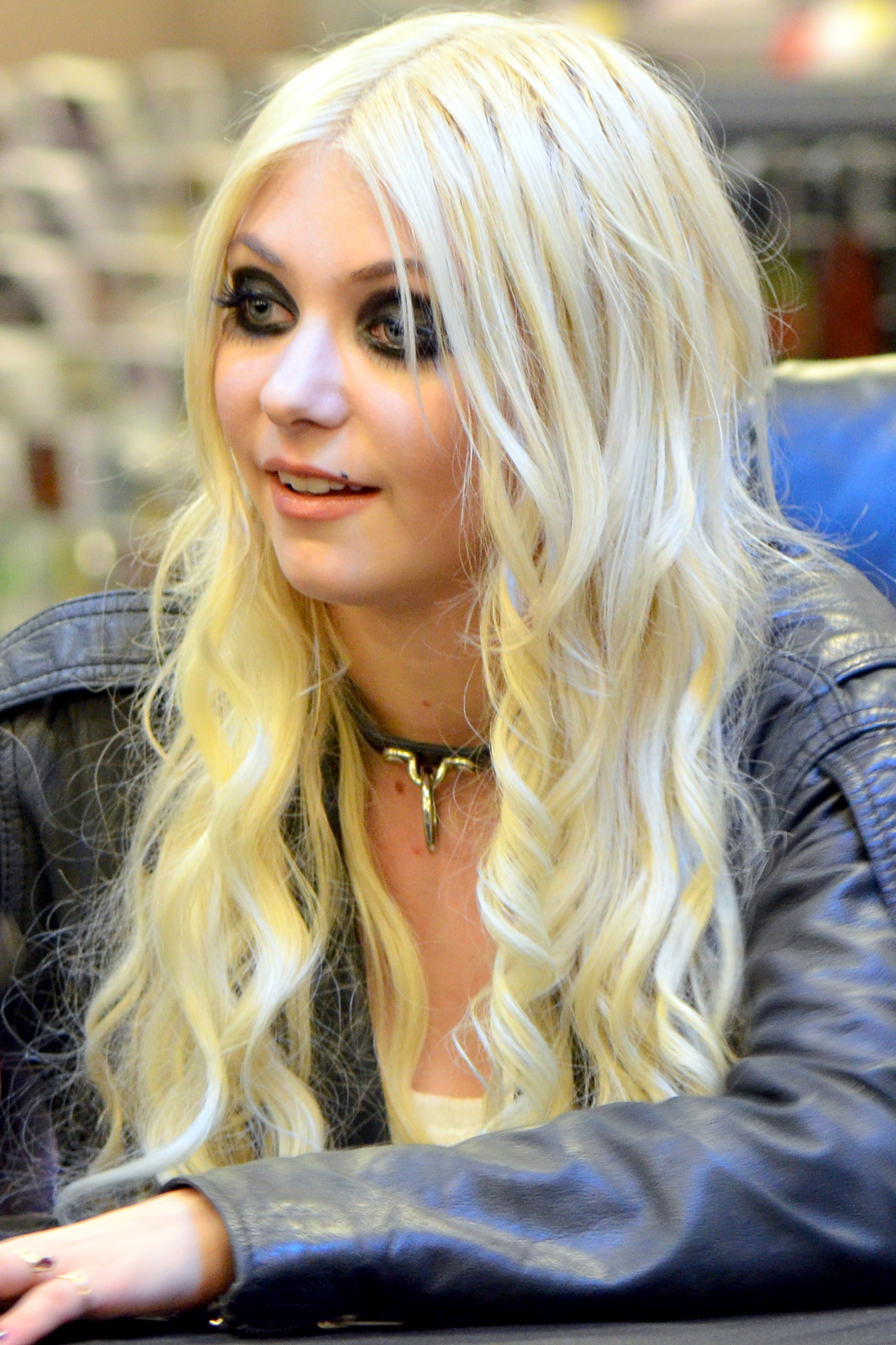
Taylor Momsen, character reference for Iris

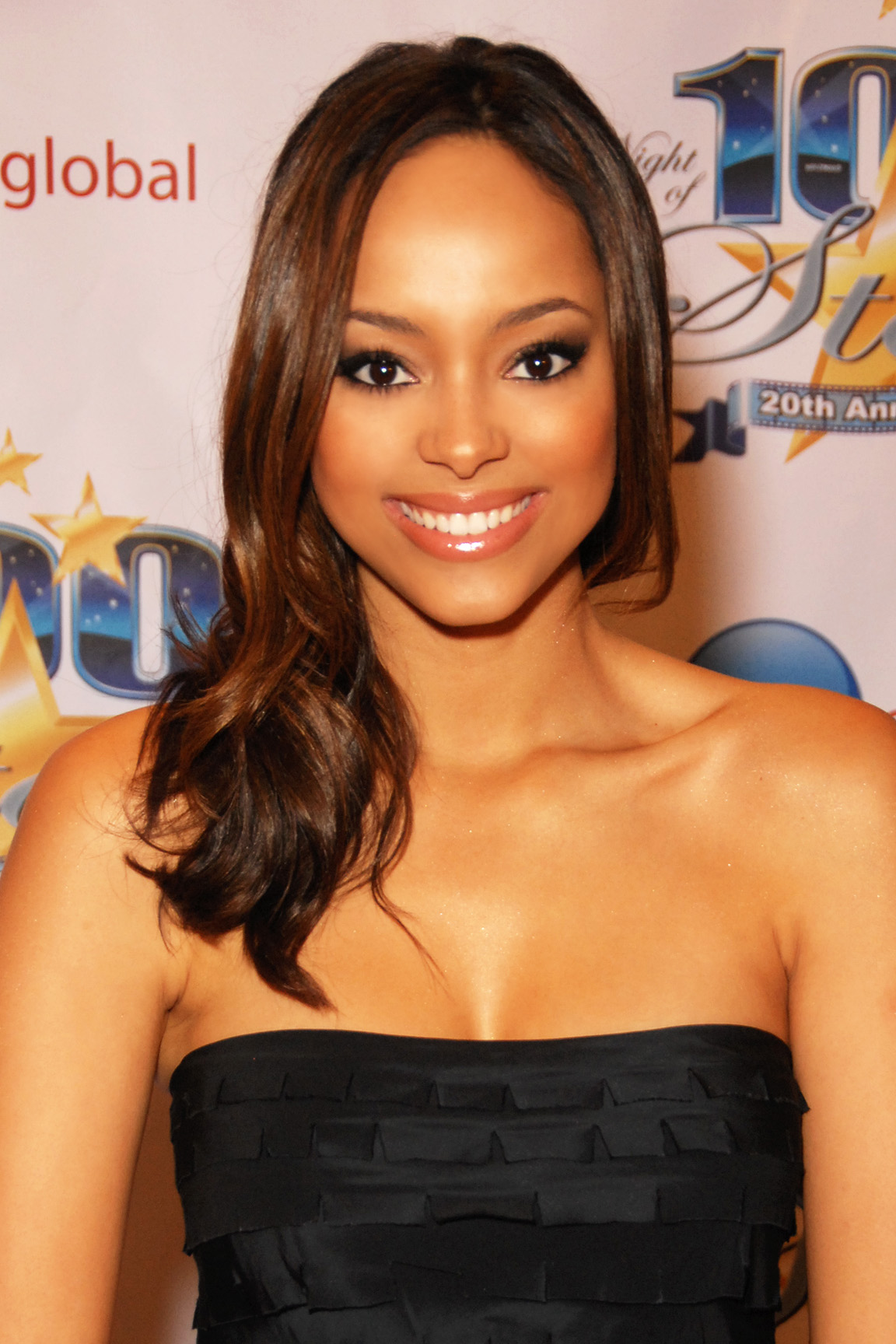
Amber Stevens West, character reference for Talia

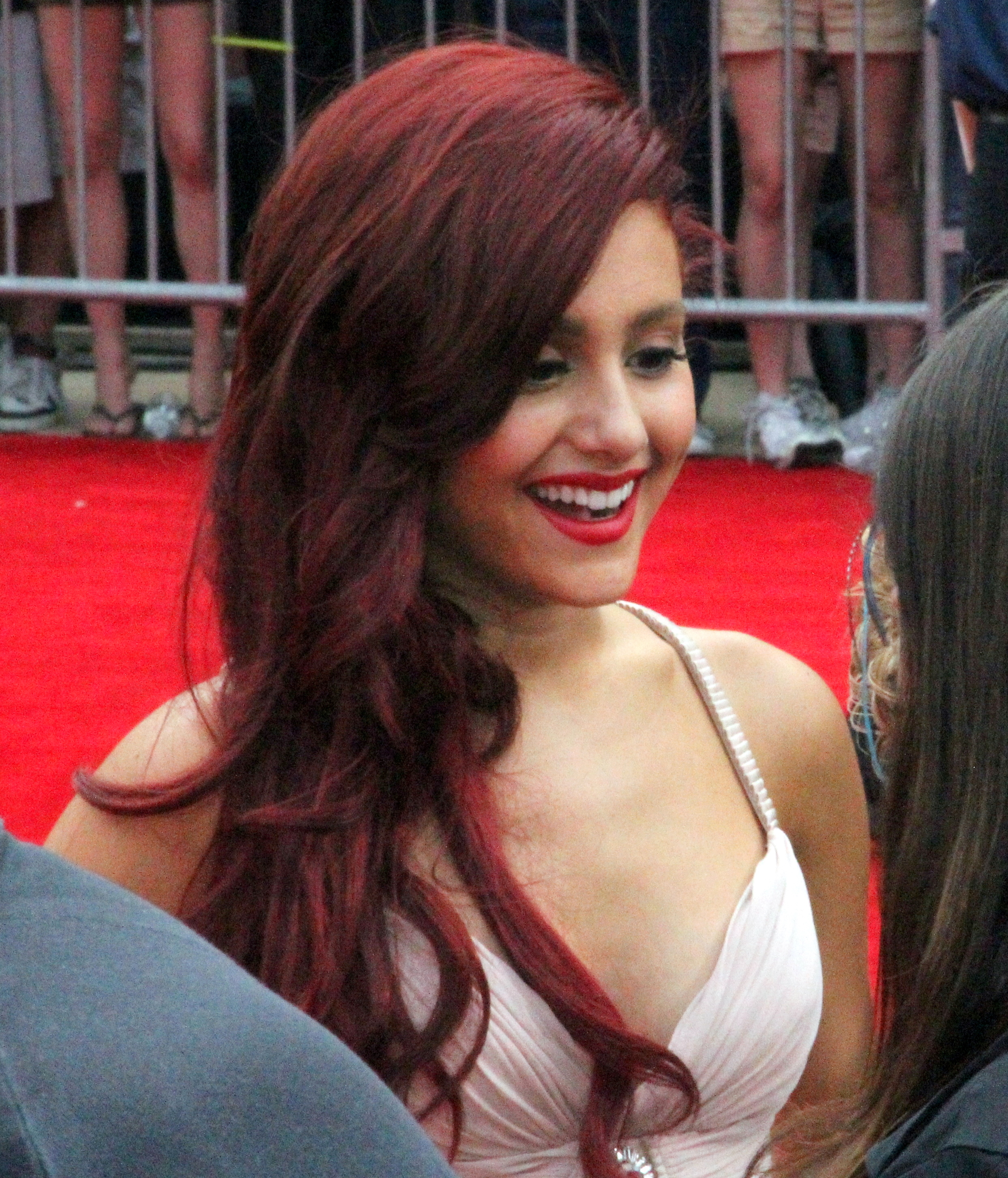
Ariana Grande, character reference for Auriana

The producers at Marathon Media asked designers to draw Iris for a magical girl project as a teenage alien princess with ice/crystal powers. Character designer Bertrand Todesco drew inspiration from Betty Autier, a French fashion blogger of "le blog de betty". She has dark hair and straight bangs, but Todesco figured the producers wanted a blonde girl for a lead, so he went with the look of Jenny Humphrey of the TV series Gossip Girl, portrayed by Taylor Momsen. The producers also wanted the girls' irises to be star-shaped. Autier's appearance as well as her wardrobe was retained for Talia.

Following the initial picture, Todesco needed to design a princess/popstar outfit, of which he chose a green dress worn by Blake Lively. The colour was changed to pink in order to be more suitable for merchandising. Todeco added a magical pet creature in the custom of Sailor Moon, which would later become Amaru. He designed in the hair streaks for when the girls were pop stars, and dresses that weren't so frilly that they would be complicated to draw.

In designing Talia and the then-named Aurora, Todesco originally started with a black girl and an Asian girl with typical hairstyles, but later changed his mind. He then found inspirations from other Gossip Girl characters as well as actresses Amber Stevens West and Ariana Grande, the latter of whom was how she acted as Cat Valentine in the teen sitcom Victorious rather than her current pop singer image. He also referenced Keri Hilson and Alicia Keys. Victorious was also the inspiration for some of the key visuals he used in promoting the series to get funding.

Early promotions of the series pictured the antagonist named Gromar to be an evil uncle of Iris who imprisoned the king and queen, and that he sent his two evil twin nephews to Earth to thwart Lolirock and take the gems. Paxson said that they abandoned the idea as it would have made him more of a stereotype. Todesco originally conceived of antagonists Praxina and Mephisto to have guitar playing sound powers that would counter the girls' singing voice powers but the idea was abandoned. After several iterations, Praxina's final design was approved where she would have a butterfly brooch and motif, while Mephisto's was approved later, after director Jean-Louis had suggested he have a snake motif and a half-covered face. Eventually Gramorr would have the covered face.

The design for the crystal magic circles and related animation was first done in 2D based on some reference pictures. Different colours and symbols were assigned to each character. It was later created in CGI. Animation tools used include Toon Boom Harmony, Adobe After Effects, and Blender.

Lyna and Carissa were created in response to a request from the producers when the writing for season 1 was nearing completion. The request was to add two new princesses to increase the member count to five. However, the LoliRock developers thought they already had too many characters, so they made Lyna and Carissa into supporting characters who were "outside the main gang but always ready and willing to help when needed". The two girls' transformations were inspired by Sailor Uranus and Sailor Neptune. The designers considered making one of the two girls East Asian to balance out the overall group's look; they applied the look to both girls and chose Lyna. There was also a concern that Carissa might be confused with Auriana as the show's redhead, so they made Carissa's hair a dark shade of orange to contrast with Auriana's cherry shade.

=== Themes and writing ===
LoliRock head writer Madellaine Paxson, who had worked on children's shows Making Fiends, Power Rangers RPM, Denji Sentai Megaranger, Power Rangers In Space, Tokumei Sentai Go-Busters as well as the horror film Blood Punch, described the themes of the show as: friendship and love, magic, singing / music, and good vs. evil. She said the hardest part in writing an episode is the beginning and also in integrating the themes along with a story with a person that needs help. Her favourite scenes from the show were where the princesses are together doing ordinary teenage girl things as they had opportunities for comedy. She summarised the show as having something for everybody, very girly, but good action too. In the press release, Zodiak Kids describe the show as having a "cast of characters that are aspirational role models for a generation of children for whom justice has become a core value". Jean-Louis Vandestoc chose a band concept for the series as it was different from his other shows which involved characters that went to school and then saved the world. The school part was replaced by the girls training or rehearsing for the concert. The developers later commented in their production blog FAQ that Iris was still attending school and that the episodes aren't all during summer vacation.

According to posts on the production Tumblr, LoliRock is classified as somewhere between a script-driven and storyboard-driven show. They started with a full script and then recorded lines with scratch voices or final voices, as re-recording after storyboarding would be costlier. The storyboard is then worked on, and some of the storyboard artists and supervisors adding and changing things they felt were important. Storyboard stage also included fixes for continuity and plot holes.

=== Music and voice-over ===
The music score was composed and produced by Norbert "Yellowshark" Gilbert, with about 600 tracks over the course of the 52 26-minute episodes. Five recurring songs (including the theme song) were recorded for each season. Due to limited resources in production, the team posted that Iris would be the only one singing on those songs, so they recorded Yasmin Shah in English and then developed the music videos. After realising that it would be unnatural for the other girls to not sing, they designed Iris to have a microphone while the others would just sing along. They considered recording singing for Talia and Auriana but were constrained by budget. Cassandre Berger provided the singing on the French dub. The voices were then mixed. As the dialogue was done later, the voice actors only sang on the incidental bits such as rehearsals.

The episodes were written and voice-recorded in English first and then adapted into French. For season 1, the English voices were recorded at Vida Spark Productions in Vancouver, British Columbia, Canada, while the French voices were recorded at Lylo studios in Paris, France.

=== Marketing and promotion ===
Zodiak Media officially announced LoliRock in April 2013 at the MIPTV event in Cannes, France. Early promotions included the idea of princesses with magical singing voices. The demographic target audience is girls ages 6 to 12, and the group partnered with France Televisions and Disney Channel France. Marathon Media CEO Vincent Chalvon-Demersay and general manager David Michel said that "LoliRock is a fresh, contemporary take on what it is to be a girl today, infused with music and magical adventures and the all-important notion of justice in today's teenage world. It's a perfect companion piece to Totally Spies!, which has been so successful in this same space." In comparing the promotion of the show to that of Totally Spies!, Zodiak senior vice-president Patricia de Wilde said that Zodiak made sure the premise was made clear for the new show.

The first five songs were publicised as music videos on YouTube. Plans were also made to create live-action LoliRock bands in various markets, such as Super TV's contest held online and among major cities in Italy. A website was launched with videos, games, and message boards. Promotional toys were also offered at Quick restaurants as well as McDonald's in France and Italy. An app was developed for the music which Zodiak senior vice-president Patricia de Wilde said was a "sort of cross between K-Pop and Katy Perry."

== Broadcast ==
The show premiered on France 3 on 18 October 2014. running for 13 episodes until March 2015. On 26 January 2016, Zodiak Kids published an article officially announcing that BatteryPOP had acquired AVOD (streaming) rights to LoliRock for one year.

On 1 April, France Televisions announced the release of episodes on France 4, and Disney France. Zodiak also reported that Italy would launch LoliRock on De Agostini Editore's Super! DTT channel. France 4 began broadcasting the 13 episodes on 4 April 2016. On 1 May, the first season of the series was released on Netflix, in the United States, Canada, the United Kingdom, and Australia.

The LoliRock producers pre-released the four episodes of season 2 on YouTube in December 2016. Netflix released the English version of the season 2 episodes on 5 January 2017. It was broadcast on France 4 in February with two episodes per weekday.

In the United States, the show premiered on the streaming service Netflix in 2016 with an English-language track and the second season premiered on the service in 2017. In 2020, Amazon's Prime Video service acquired the show and it was subsequently removed from Netflix in select countries.

On March 22, 2023, Jean-Louis Vandestoc announced that he had just finished his first creative meeting regarding a possible third season of the show.

On June 21, 2026, Banijay Entertainment confirmed a third season had been commissioned by France Télévisions, would be produced by Banijay Kids & Family, Zodiak Kids & Family, and Xentrix Studios, and would feature the band "travelling the globe on tour". On June 25, Jean-Louis Vandestoc's posted a trailer on Instagram for the third season, which announced that the season would air in 2028.

== Reception ==
Ella Anders of BSC Kids wrote that LoliRock "plays it clear as a magical girl series and even nods other iconic shows in the genera" such as Pretty Cure, Wedding Peach, Tokyo Mew Mew and Sailor Moon, but that it is "grand in its own right and should be held up as a great magical girl series". She liked the diverse cast, plot, humor, and background story, the last of which she had not seen since Friendship Is Magic, and that it was a type of show she would have loved growing up.

Heather Newman of Forbes magazine described the series as "A French animated series about an impossibly thin, stylish, magical girl who sings."

Emily Ashby of Common Sense Media described the series as "fun" and "entertaining." However, she argued that the dual storyline felt "a little awkward and forced at times" and wondered if promoting the music of the show was a motivation for these storylines. Even so, she concluded that the series would "garner some fans among kids."

When asked whether LoliRock would have a cross-over episode with French superhero show Miraculous: Tales of Ladybug & Cat Noir from Zagtoon, Thomas Astruc, who was the creator and director on Miraculous and a storyboarder on LoliRock, said it was unlikely given they are from two different production companies, but that the animation community is small and that both companies share the same love of animation. He has posted about the two being cousin shows.

== Other media ==
A LoliRock video game was released by Bulkypix in 2014 for iOS and Android. The game let players sing to the songs featured on the show, record performances, and customise a sound studio and pick the girls' outfits. The game is no longer available.

Zodiak has also worked a deal with publishing company Hachette Jeunesse to create novels, activity books, stationery, and e-‍books.
