= Colpo di fulmine =

Colpo di fulmine may refer to:

- Colpo di fulmine (English: “lightning strike”), an Italian idiom meaning love at first sight
- Love at First Sight (1985 film) (Italian: Colpo di fulmine), a 1985 Italian comedy film
- "Colpo di fulmine" (song), a 2008 song by Giò Di Tonno and Lola Ponce
- Lightning Strike (Italian: Colpi di fulmine), a 2012 Italian comedy film

== See also ==
- Coup de foudre (disambiguation)
- Fulmine (disambiguation)
