= Foudre =

Foudre may refer to:

- Foudre, the French word for "lightning" or "thunderbolt"
- Foudre Sportive d'Akonolinga, a Cameroonian football club
- French ship Foudre, various French naval ships

== See also ==
- Coup de foudre (disambiguation)
