= List of LoliRock episodes =

LoliRock is a French animated television series produced by Marathon Media. It was created by Jean Louis-Vandestoc and written by Madellaine Paxson. It first aired in France on 18 October 2014 on France 3, and has expanded to television channels in Europe. It has also been licensed worldwide, with an English dub released to Netflix on 1 May 2016. The LoliRock producers released the four episodes of season 2 on YouTube in December 2016. Netflix has released the English dub of the season 2 episodes on 5 January 2017. The second season was broadcast on France 4 in February with two episodes per weekday.

In 2023, it was announced that a third season is in production and scheduled for release in 2028.

== Series overview ==
Series	Episodes	Originally released	
Series	Episodes	First released	Last released
1	26	18 October 2014	29 April 2016
2	26	13 February 2017	2 March 2017
3	26	2028	TBD

== Episode list ==
=== Season 1 (2014–2016) ===
Most episodes are self-contained and can be viewed in any order, save for certain episodes that would fit the progression: "To Find a Princess" (Ep. 1), "Xeris" (Ep. 6), "Shanila Surprise" (Ep. 19) and the final two episodes (Ep. 25 and 26). The in-story time between episodes was estimated to be from a few days to one or two weeks. The fifth episode "Sing for Me" was originally broadcast as the second episode, and viewers expressed concern that Iris had learned her magic too quickly after the first episode.

All episodes were directed by Jean Louis-Vandestoc unless noted. 13 episodes were broadcast in 2014–15 on France 3, and 13 new episodes were broadcast in 2016 on France 4.

No. overall	No. in season	English Title French Title	Written by	Original release date	Prod. code
1	1	"To Find a Princess" "L'audition"	Madellaine Paxson	18 October 2014	101
Iris is an ordinary teenage girl, but when she sings, strange things occur. After losing a series of babysitting jobs, she decides to audition for a new girl band called LoliRock. But when she sings in front of the judges Talia and Auriana, she causes the auditorium seats to fly off. She flees, but is chased down by Praxina and Mephisto, two people from another world who want to capture her. Talia and Auriana save Iris and tell her that she is really a princess from the world of Ephedia and that she has magical powers. When Praxina and Mephisto imprison Iris's aunt Ellen and the others, Iris taps into her power to join Talia and Auriana to defeat the evil twins.
2	2	"Flower Power" "Le mystère des fleurs"	Madellaine Paxson	1 November 2014	102
Iris and her classmates enter a flower show competition, but when the contestants' flowers start disappearing, Iris suspects her own flower Rosie is behind the abduction. However, they soon discover a large mole-like creature has been taking the plants, and it has even stolen Iris's pendant. Iris and the two girls face the creature as well as Praxina and Mephisto.
3	3	"Be Mine" "Coup de foudre"	Madellaine Paxson	15 November 2014	103
While rescuing a boy from falling containers, Iris and the guy suddenly fall in love with each other. Iris's infatuation interferes with her magical girl training, and the boy's real girlfriend is heartbroken. Talia and Auriana discover that another magic creature that shoots Cupid-like arrows is behind the mayhem.
4	4	"The Birthday" "La prémonition"	Madellaine Paxson	10 January 2015	104
While Aunt Ellen downplays her 50th birthday, Iris gets inspired to celebrate her birthday anyway by throwing a surprise party with Talia and Auriana helping to decorate. Iris receives a mysterious music box from a fan that gives her a dream about her rescuing a boy from a falling shelf at the store. When it comes true, she wonders if she has the power to predict the future, but it is actually a trick from Praxina and Mephisto. They lure Iris to a house by giving her a dream that she may meet her parents.
5	5	"Sing for Me" "Une voix magique"	Eddie Guzelian	31 January 2015	105
LoliRock and a choir group are planning to perform at a charity concert, but during rehearsals, Iris and the choir girls lose their singing voices. Talia and Auriana join Iris in an effort to retrieve their voices, although without the singing, Iris has less power.
6	6	"Xeris" "Xeris"	Madellaine Paxson	29 November 2014	106
While fighting Praxina and Mephisto, Talia uses a special medallion that launches a large blast wave to defeat them. Praxina and Mephisto find the medallion but when they show it to Gramorr, the latter orders them to destroy it. Iris and Auriana are excited about Talia's power, but she isn't so keen about sharing what it is about, as the medallion was her big sister Izira's. She shares about her family's history about how Izira was the responsible one and how one day when Talia went to attend a festival, her home was attacked and destroyed, and her family is gone missing. Iris and the girls confront Praxina and Mephisto to try to get the medallion back, but Praxina destroys it, leaving Talia devastated. However, afterwards, Amaru had recovered a shard of the medallion and the girls are able to trace it to Izira and discover she is still alive.
7	7	"Sirens" "Le trésor de l'épave"	Laura McCreary	22 November 2014	107
During a cruise ship event, Iris's pendant goes off. The girls cast detection magic which leads to something underneath the ship. They rescue a guy who had gotten stuck under a rock when he was trying to recover his grandfather's jewels from a sunken ship. Afterwards, they are able to locate the sunken ship, but Praxina and Mephisto summon a sea dragon to attack Iris, while they go after Talia and Auriana. After some fighting, Auriana calls out to a nearby baby whale, and its mother defeats the dragon. They lift up the ship and recover the jewels for the guy and his grandfather.
8	8	"Talia and Kyle Sitting in a Tree" "Amour double"	Rhonda Smiley	8 November 2014	108
A handsome boy named Kyle takes an interest in Talia, but she refuses to date him, despite his persistence. But when Kyle gives Talia a present, Talia suddenly starts having an interest in him. Iris and Auriana suspect Praxina and Mephisto have some role in this, and eventually discover there is a monster impersonating the real Kyle.
9	9	"A Promise is a Promise" "Promis juré!"	Rhonda Smiley	25 October 2014	109
Auriana has been boy-crazy recently, so the other girls try to get her to take her work seriously. Auriana falls for a boy who has been working at a nearby museum at the dinosaur exhibit. The boy invites them to the museum, during which Iris's pendant goes off and they suspect there is an Oracle Gem in one of the jewels on display. The girls must outwit a security guard. Meanwhile, Praxina and Mephisto cause a dinosaur bone exhibit to come alive.
10	10	"Lucky Star" "Une vie de star"	Shea Fontana	15 April 2016	110
LoliRock attends a party for a child star named Lily Bowen, but she does not have any real friends since she has been working on her celebrity life. The girls try to help Lily out, but Praxina and Mephisto transform a photo booth into a sleep-inducing monster.
11	11	"Step Right Up" "Sous une bonne étoile"	Elise Allen	13 April 2016	111
The LoliRock girls go out with a trio of girls from an orphanage. Praxina and Mephisto pretend to be carnival game operators, giving toy prizes to the girls. The LoliRock girls discover that the orphans are a bit selfish when it comes to how they have divided their room, and they ponder how to help them be friends. But at night, the toys come to life and attack the LoliRock girls and capture the three orphans.
12	12	"No Thanks for the Memories" "Mémoire trouble"	Anne-Marie Perrotta	25 April 2016	112
Iris has been having trouble memorizing the lyrics to their newest song, so the other girls try to remove her distractions. However, Praxina and Mephisto brainwash Iris into thinking they are her best friends and that Auriana and Talia are jealous enemies. Iris believes the twins and is about to help on a spell to reach Gramorr, but Auriana and Talia try to stop her. They use the song as a trigger to snap Iris back to normal.
13	13	"Batty" "Peur du noir"	Rhonda Smiley	6 December 2014	113
Iris rescues a scientist who was exploring a cave that could contain ore that would help with clean energy. Praxina and Mephisto summon a giant monster bat to attack Iris and to try to claim the energy-boosting ore for Gramorr.
14	14	"Castles in the Sand" "Les pieds dans le sable"	Eddie Guzelian	21 April 2016	114
In preparation for a beach event, the LoliRock girls volunteer to clean up the beach. When Mephisto observes Iris secretly using a whirlwind to help a child who was picking up trash, he makes a larger-scale whirlwind to attack the event and capture Nathaniel. The girls must rescue him while fending off the nosy blog reporter Doug's inquiries.
15	15	"Stitches" "Cousu de fil noir"	Catherine Lieuwen	14 April 2016	115
Auriana falls for an aspiring fashion designer and makes her own clothes with a little help of her magic in preparation for a fashion show. When the truck carrying the designer's clothes is in danger of falling off a bridge, the girls come to the rescue, but Praxina and Mephisto use the distraction to capture Auriana's clothes and harness its magic powers.
16	16	"Camp Princess" "Une nuit à la belle étoile"	Anne-Marie Perrotta	13 November 2014	116
The girls work as counselors for a girl scout camp. One of the girls is afraid of being outside at night, but needs to do so for her merit badge so the girls agree to stay with her. Praxina and Mephisto enchant a totem pole to create three shadow monsters: an eagle, wolf, and bear.
17	17	"Heavy Metal" "Guitare en solo"	Madellaine Paxson	3 January 2015	117
At a music showcase concert, Iris encourages her schoolmate Zack Brady to perform with his parents watching, but when he goes on stage, his guitar mysteriously flies off. Other performers' instruments also fly away. The girls suspect it is the work of the twins but when they confront them, the twins' band monster is able to cancel out all their attacks. Iris must decide whether to defeat the monster at the cost of destroying the instruments.
18	18	"Legend of Lake Agnes" "La légende du lac Yness"	Rhonda Smiley	18 April 2016	118
When the girls spend a day at the lake, Auriana meets a guy and his brother who are planning on going fishing. The younger brother hopes to see Agnes, nicknamed Aggie, a mysterious lake creature, and Auriana is excited to look for it. But when some creature bumps into their boat, the girls suspect it is the work of the twins.
19	19	"Shanila Surprise" "Shanila"	Madellaine Paxson	17 January 2015	119
Iris discovers one day that her hair has become short. Talia and Auriana explain that it is because she is going through Shanila, a coming-of-age phase in an Ephedian's life where she has attained a new level of power. However, until she reaches the next level in her abilities, her magic is weak. In order to continue training, Iris turns down a trip to the slide park with Nathaniel, although Auriana volunteers to go. Praxina and Mephisto cause trouble at the park to lure the weakened Iris out.
20	20	"Raffle Battle" "Tombola Mania"	Rhonda Smiley	22 April 2016	120
The LoliRock girls buy raffle tickets to support a girl's fundraiser, but her remaining raffle booklets are later stolen. They suspect Praxina and Mephisto are behind it but when they go to confront them, they see they are just arguing with each other and are unconcerned, leading the girls to believe someone else is behind it. This is affirmed when they are attacked by twin brothers who are so adept at casting magic, they even finish each other's sentences.
21	21	"Dance Craze" "Une Soirée Magique"	Elise Allen	26 April 2016	121
The LoliRock girls receive a rare visit from Morgaine, a powerful Ephedian sorceress who only comes out of seclusion once every ten years. Morgaine plans to teach the girls a powerful spell, but Iris gets distracted by the happenings of the Halloween dance in which she has a chance to dance with Nathaniel. Praxina and Mephisto try to capture Iris, but grab Missy, who was wearing a similar pirate costume as Iris instead. The twins then capture Iris when she rescues Missy. Although the twins lure out Morgaine, she is able to fight a bit, and the LoliRock girls are able to learn the spell to defeat the twins and their monster.
22	22	"The Haunting" "La maison des ombres"	Rhonda Smiley	20 April 2016	122
Iris helps out Ella, a girl who has moved into the neighborhood. Ella is worried her house is haunted because it looks worn out. Talia reveals that she can see ghosts, so she and Auriana fashion a device out of a hair dryer that supposedly detects ghosts in order to show Ella that the house isn't really haunted. But Praxina and Mephisto cause trouble and scare the girl.
23	23	"Spellbound" "Grimoire à vendre"	Mirith Colad	19 April 2016	123
Aunt Ellen donates a bunch of her old books for a fundraiser book sale, but Talia's special book of spells got mixed in. Praxina and Mephisto snatch the book and summon a gorilla-like monster.
24	24	"Smart" "La Menace Mobile"	Eddie Guzelian	27 April 2016	124
When the LoliRock girls are caught by Doug doing magic, they try to write it off as special effects. They have Doug follow them for the whole day so he can blog about their lives are that of typical normal teenage girls. When Praxina and Mephisto discover Doug carries around a smart phone to vlog everything, they capture him and turn the phone into a monster that knows the LoliRock girls' personalities and battle tendencies. Iris and the girls ultimately defeat the monster by confusing it by pretending to act like each other instead of their real selves.
25	25	"Home, Part 1" "Ephedia (premiere partie)"	Madellaine Paxson	28 April 2016	125
After having their first televised concert, the LoliRock girls ponder their expanding fame. But a meteor heads towards Earth and the girls scramble to stop it. The meteor fragments turn into strings that capture them. Praxina and Mephisto deliver the princesses to Gramorr, who has Talia and Auriana transported to the prison fortress Krozak, but on the way, two girls in cloaks defeat the guards and capture Talia and Auriana. Gramorr offers Iris her regular life back as well as her parents if she gives him the crown. When she refuses, Gramorr has the twins summon a large monster that encases everyone in Sunny Bay into dark crystals, and Iris is thrown in a prison cell. Talia and Auriana free themselves from their new captors. Iris meets Lev, a fellow prisoner, and they escape their cells. Talia and Auriana discover that their captors are actually Lyna and Carissa, assistants to the leader of the resistance, who reveals herself to be Talia's big sister Izira.
26	26	"Home, Part 2" "Ephedia (deuxieme partie)"	Madellaine Paxson	29 April 2016	126
Iris and Lev escape and evade the guards but first they must retrieve the crown. However, when Iris takes the crown, she is captured by Gramorr. Izira shares that she was freed by Lyna and Carissa, and formed the resistance. Gramorr continues to pressure Iris into surrendering the crown, threatening to encase everyone on Earth in crystal until Iris finally gives up. But when Iris proceeds to recite the words that would release the crown, the resistance arrives and defeats the guards. Iris gets her pendant back and transforms. But before they can get the upper hand on Gramorr, they realize the crown still has more jewels to get, and they return to Earth to defeat the monster. Afterwards, the crown is encased once again, and Lyna and Carissa join the girls on Earth while Izira continues with leading the resistance efforts. As LoliRock performs, Lev watches in amusement.

=== Season 2 (2017) ===
The LoliRock production team released four of the season 2 episodes on YouTube in French as a special Christmas preview. The English version of the episodes were released on Netflix on 5 January 2017. The episodes were broadcast on France 4 starting 13 February, running two episodes per weekday.

No. overall	No. in season	English Title French Title	Written by	Original release date	Prod. code
27	1	"Musical Magical Tour" "Une Tournée Magique!"	Madellaine Paxson	17 December 2016 (French YouTube preview); 13 February 2017 (France 4)	2.01
Aunt Ellen and the LoliRock girls persuade Lara, a former promoter, to try to get them booked for a festival concert at Riverdale Stadium, but the concert lead manager refuses to let Lara participate as she has had a bad reputation of messing up the acts. Meanwhile, Mephisto and Praxina get new powers from an oracle gem they collected and attack LoliRock while they play in the parking lot. With help from Lyna and Carissa, the LoliRock girls defeat the siblings.
28	2	"If You Can’t Beat 'Em..." "La bonne action!"	Elise Allen	21 December 2016 (French YouTube preview); 13 February 2017 (France 4)	2.02
Mephisto and Praxina consider doing good deeds like the LoliRock girls in order to get the oracle gems, but their attempts at helping backfire. Praxina summons a beast to capture people so they can rescue them but that backfires too as the beast captures Praxina. Meanwhile, the LoliRock girls have been rehearsing for their performance, but Iris is having trouble with her dance routine. They help Mephisto fight the beast.
29	3	"Puppylove" "Mordu D'Amour"	Rhonda Smiley and James Hereth	24 December 2016 (French YouTube preview); 14 February 2017 (France 4)	2.03
Amaru makes friends with a puppy in the neighborhood. The LoliRock girls discover the puppy is named Snowflake, and is the pet of Missy's cousin, but both Amaru and Snowflake have gone missing. Praxina and Mephisto capture Snowflake but Amaru escapes and finds the girls.
30	4	"Super Cute Kitten" "Un chat trop chou?"	Mirith Colao	28 December 2016 (French YouTube preview); 14 February 2017 (France 4)	2.04
The Lolirock girls find an adorable new kitten, and Amaru starts to get jealous. At night, the kitten starts to drain Iris's powers. Amaru runs away and gets picked up by a young girl. While Carissa and Lyna look for Amaru, the kitten drains Talia's power and reveals itself to be Banes.
31	5	"Wicked Red" "Loli-Rousse"	Laura McCreary	5 January 2017 (Netflix release); 15 February 2017 (France 4)	2.05
Auriana becomes the product model for a shampoo company and gets a multi-year supply of shampoo. However, she becomes increasingly mean and selfish towards her friends and her photographer at the various events. Auriana sides with Praxina and Mephisto. Talia and Iris discover the shampoo is the cause. Together with Carissa and Lyna, they try to stop them at an event where Auriana is going to debut as the entertainer Wicked Red.
32	6	"Blurred Vision" "Un message troublant"	Rhonda Smiley and James Hereth	5 January 2017 (Netflix release); 15 February 2017 (France 4)	2.06
Aunt Ellen gives Princess Iris a gift for her birthday: a box with an Ephedian item called a vocalextra. It contains a holographic message from her mother who tells Iris that she was sent to Earth for her protection and that she should stop fighting. Iris struggles with the message but goes on to help Shelby, a childhood friend who wants to give up her dream of being a surfer. Talia and Auriana discover the message was corrupted by the twins' evil magic. After encouraging Shelby to try again, Princess Iris joins the other girls as they face the twins and their lobster-like monster.
33	7	"Princess Brenda, Part I" "Recherche d'Identité, 1ère partie"	Madellaine Paxson	5 January 2017 (Netflix release); 16 February 2017 (France 4)	2.07
When Iris keeps having to be called away to her activities as a magical princess, Nathaniel starts to lose faith in his relationship with her. They try to set a lunch date. Iris and the LoliRock girls help a visiting girl named Brenda who is looking for her birth mother. While Iris excuses herself to catch up with Nathaniel, Praxina and Mephisto discover that Izira's medallion, which they have been holding, is suddenly attracted to Brenda, and abduct her, thinking she is a magical princess. Iris cancels her date again and rushes back to help the other girls, but the twins already restored the medallion, having found its missing fragment inside the bracelet that Auriana loaned to Brenda.
34	8	"Princess Brenda, Part II" "Recherche d'Identité, 2ème partie"	Eddie Guzelian	5 January 2017 (Netflix release); 16 February 2017 (France 4)	2.08
Mephisto and Praxina harness the power of Izira's Medallion. Nathaniel sees Iris and the girls fly off with Amaru and follows them. The girls fight the twins, but Nathaniel is witness to the whole thing and then arrives to the scene. Iris apologizes to Nathaniel but then the twins encase everyone in crystal. Enraged at the twins for hurting her loved ones, Iris uses her Shanila powers to get back the medallion, which enables her to turn back time.
35	9	"Cute as a Doll" "Une poupée singulière"	Rhonda Smiley and James Hereth	5 January 2017 (Netflix release); 17 February 2017 (France 4)	2.09
Lyna and Carissa have been fighting over whether spells or physical skills are more important in a magical princess battle. Iris helps a friend by looking after his little sister so he can take a girl that he likes out on a date. Mephisto learns a spell that makes people disappear, but when he casts it on Lyna, he shrinks her to the size of a doll. The little sister picks up Lyna, thinking she's a real doll and brings her to her room. The other girls discover Lyna is missing and track her down to the house. Praxina and Mephisto go to the house as well, hoping to shrink the other girls.
36	10	"Amaru-niverse" "Multi-Amaru"	Elise Allen & Madellaine Paxson	5 January 2017 (Netflix release); 17 February 2017 (France 4)	2.10
Carissa wants to learn more spells but Talia tells her she is not ready yet. Feeling useless, Carissa goes to the library and tries a multiplication spell in order to try to amplify the magic. However, when she casts it on Amaru, he ends up splitting into three Amarus with different personalities: one is an angry Amaru who wants to destroy everything, another extremely timid and evasive, and the third laid back and wanting to eat everything. The girls try to find the three Amarus so they can restore him before he dissipates from using too much energy. But the twins try to use the angry Amaru to attack the girls.
37	11	"Rex" "Rex 2.0"	Laura McCreary	5 January 2017 (Netflix release); 20 February 2017 (France 4)	2.11
Talia has been building a robot without having to resort to magic, but Auriana secretly casts a spell on Rex to make it a good-looking and smooth-talking android. Talia enters the robot in a competition, where the girls discover she is trying to impress Kyle. When Rex leads all competitors in the first day, Kyle is sad that he won't be able to win the prize: a month at Robot Camp, and Talia considers withdrawing. The twins cast a spell on Rex so that he can sneak into the girls' house and open a portal for the twins to attack them at the library. Talia has Auriana cancel her spell and convert Rex back to the robot that Talia had originally constructed.
38	12	"Lost in the Shadows" "Dans l'ombre d'une star"	Rhonda Smiley and James Hereth	5 January 2017 (Netflix release); 20 February 2017 (France 4)	2.12
The girls are opening for a singing duo named Quicksand Ferret, but they discover member Sandy has no showed for another rehearsal, and their record executive threatens to cancel their contract, leaving their other member Felix sad. Upon locating Sandy, the girls learn that she has been missing rehearsals because she is no longer enjoying the fame anymore, and longs to go back to the days where she and Felix just had fun. Iris and the girls try to have them meet for a date, but the twins take advantage of them.
39	13	"I Want My LTV" "Silence on tourne…"	Robin Stein and Daniel Bryan Franklin	5 January 2017 (Netflix release); 21 February 2017 (France 4)	2.13
When the Lolirock girls want to promote their newest single, Nathaniel suggests they should make a music video. But soon afterwards, a guy enters the smoothie bar claiming to be a music video director, and convinces the girls to join him at his studio to make the video. During the preparations, he has the girls be in a prehistoric cavewoman setting and requests they remove their jewelry, but as soon as the girls do that, he and his assistant reveal themselves to be the evil twins. Unable to use their magic and powers, the girls must recover their jewelry before the twins hand them to Gramorr.
40	14	"Desert Heat" "Un artiste bien connu"	Robin Stein and Daniel Bryan Franklin	5 January 2017 (Netflix release); 21 February 2017 (France 4)	2.14
While at a music festival in the desert, the Lolirock girls come across DJ Ezra, a charming guy who Auriana can't help but notice something is familiar about him. Ezra asks Iris to come with him to help one of his crew members whose truck was stuck in the desert, but when Iris goes along, she is captured by the twins and encased in an especially strong magic shell. After doing the same to Talia and Auriana, he reveals that he is Jodan, Auriana's brother from Volta, who persuaded Gramorr to free himself, Auriana and their family in exchange for the princesses, but Gramorr breaks his promise. The girls use their newly-practiced skill of boosting their magic to break out of the shells and defeat the twins. Although she is unable to save Jodan from returning to Ephedia, Auriana discovers he is still alive.
41	15	"The Ruby of the Orient" "Le rubis de L'Orient"	Robin Stein and Daniel Bryan Franklin	5 January 2017 (Netflix release); 22 February 2017 (France 4)	2.15
The Lolirock girls find a local artist named Debra to design a flier for their next concert. Debra and her grandfather are having to sell their house, but Iris detects something magical in one of their paintings. They find a message behind the painting from the Jack of Hearts, Debra's great-grandfather, who was accused of stealing a priceless ruby, but claimed he was innocent. They follow the clue to the museum where they extract another message behind a painting, however, the twins steal the message, thinking the ruby is for an oracle gem. After defeating the twins, the girls learn that the ruby was actually supposed to be for the great-grandfather, and Debra's family is able to save their home.
42	16	"Loli-Lime Sublime" "Le Loli-Smoothie"	Robin Stein and Daniel Bryan Franklin	5 January 2017 (Netflix release); 22 February 2017 (France 4)	2.16
An Ephedian eclipse has started which causes the girls' magic powers to be glitchy. The Smoothie Bar where Nathaniel works is going out of business because of a competing store in town. The girls help Nathaniel with advertising, and when Auriana accidentally knocks some extra fruits into the smoothie, the resulting concoction becomes a big hit. Taking advantage of the glitchy security system, Praxina and Mephisto sneak into the girls' house to steal a powerful spell book.
43	17	"Truth Be Told" "Ellira"	Robin Stein and Daniel Bryan Franklin	5 January 2017 (Netflix release); 23 February 2017 (France 4)	2.17
The twins use a voice changing crystal to trick the LoliRock girls to meet at different places, but when they ambush Iris, a mysterious masked woman using crystal magic drives them away. The girls find a necklace at the battle site but are unable to trace its owner, that is, until Iris brings it home and discovers the necklace is drawn to Aunt Ellen. Iris learns that Ellen is actually an Ephedian royal guard named Ellira who was tasked by Iris's mother to take care of and protect Iris on Earth. Iris and Ellen help the other two girls defeat the twins.
44	18	"Dancing Shoes" "Un cours de danse particulier"	Robin Stein and Daniel Bryan Franklin	5 January 2017 (Netflix release); 23 February 2017 (France 4)	2.18
When Talia has trouble learning the girls' latest dance routine, the girls seek help from a dance instructor, who has Talia stay for extra practice, and to put on a set of dance shoes. However, the instructor is actually Praxina, and the shoes brainwash Talia into working for the twins. When Iris and Auriana help a somewhat clumsy guy named Taylor look for his wedding rings, they encounter Talia who then fights the girls.
45	19	"Amateur Hour" "La baguette ensorcelée"	Robin Stein and Daniel Bryan Franklin	5 January 2017 (Netflix release); 24 February 2017 (France 4)	2.19
The LoliRock girls are scheduled to be a final act for a talent showcase at Sunny Bay. A young magician named Mark the Magnificent flops his audition, but the girls encourage him to practice, and he becomes more confident in doing his tricks. The twins give Mark a wand that lets him cast real magic. When he uses it in a practice, the girls discover it comes from Gramorr, but Mark refuses to give it up. The twins recruit Mark to their cause and use the wand to mind control him.
46	20	"Strawberry Fields for Never" "La cueillette de cristal noir"	Robin Stein and Daniel Bryan Franklin	5 January 2017 (Netflix release); 24 February 2017 (France 4)	2.20
Iris, Auriana, and Lyna visit a strawberry farm, but the field is not producing any berries. The girls detect dark crystal magic and see a bunch of holes in the ground. Praxina and Mephisto have been blasting holes in the ground to uncover an alien object that crash landed months before, which turns out to be an Xanathian ogre. The ogre soon awakens, grows big, and starts heading towards Sunny Bay to destroy things. While Iris tries to stall the ogre, Lyna and Auriana gather strawberries to make a potion to counter the ogre's powers.
47	21	"Stop in the Name of Lev, Part I" "La trahison, 1ère partie"	Madellaine Paxson	5 January 2017 (Netflix release); 2 March 2017 (France 4)	2.21
Lara books LoliRock to perform on a high-profile television gig. When Iris tries to share the good news with Nathaniel, she is surprised to see him paying attention to Missy Robins. She later encounters Lev, the Ephedian thief from season 1, who provides Iris with a vocalextra message from her father telling her to come back to Ephedia and to trust no one. Suspecting the vocalextra might be corrupted, Talia and Auriana fight over casting the verification spell, and the vocalextra breaks. Iris tries to confide with Nathaniel, but Missy's arrival has the two acting like lovers again, which causes Iris to leave crying and deciding to go with Lev. Talia discovers Missy is wearing an Ephedian hairpin that has caused her and Nathaniel to be brainwashed. Talia and Auriana rush over to Iris at the portal entrance and warn her that someone is lying. The twins arrive and fight them, but are summoned away by Gramorr.
48	22	"Stop in the Name of Lev, Part II" "La trahison, 2ème partie"	Madellaine Paxson	5 January 2017 (Netflix release); 2 March 2017 (France 4)	2.22
Talia and Auriana convince Iris to wait for confirmation from Izira before going through the portal. At first, Izira corroborates the message, but it soon shown that Izira's message was also interfered with by the dark crystal magic. After the girls attend their video shoot, Iris goes with Lev through the portal, only to discover it is another trap by Gramorr, who had manipulated Iris's father into saying those words. Talia and Auriana learn from Izira that the message was corrupted and they rush to the portal, where Lev is kicked back to Earth as his reward for delivering Iris. Talia, Auriana and Lev rescue Iris and fight Gramorr, who tries to close the portal. But Lev sacrifices himself to hold the portal open so the girls can escape.
49	23	"Statue Game" "Le jeu des statues"	Robin Stein and Daniel Bryan Franklin	5 January 2017 (Netflix release); 1 March 2017 (France 4)	2.23
The twins have learned a joint spell to turn people into solid ice statues. Carissa learns about the value of teamwork when she watches a soccer practice. One of the soccer girls Jenny does not want to pass the ball, and despite scoring a goal, is scolded by her coach. But when the twins attack, Jenny is turned into a statue, and so are Talia and Iris, it is up to Carissa and Amaru to save them.
50	24	"Forget You!" "Tombée dans l'oubli"	Robin Stein and Daniel Bryan Franklin	5 January 2017 (Netflix release); 27 February 2017 (France 4)	2.24
During a fight between LoliRock girls and the twins, Praxina calls up a powerful spell, but it backfires. Praxina wakes up to find that she has lost her memories. The girls try to teach her how to be good, which gives her some warm feelings she has not had before. Mephisto returns to take back Praxina, and summons a monster to fight the LoliRock girls. He gives her a crown that will restore her memories. Praxina feels sad for Mephisto during the fight, but Iris lets Praxina choose to put on the crown.
51	25	"Crowning Glory, Part I" "L'heure de gloire, 1ère partie"	Robin Stein and Daniel Bryan Franklin	5 January 2017 (Netflix release); 28 February 2017 (France 4)	2.25
With the crown's twelve gems almost complete, Talia and Auriana are excited about returning to Ephedia, but Iris has thoughts about how she will break the news to Nathaniel. She invites him to a picnic, but hesitates to answer whether she will be his girlfriend. Mephisto pretends to be a boy whose house burned down in, and tricks Iris into letting him stay in their home. While the girls host a fundraiser for him, he returns to the house and steals an important book from their enchanted library. Afterwards, Nathaniel confesses his love to Iris and Iris agrees to be his girlfriend, but Mephisto freezes Nathaniel and uses the spellbook to divert the gem to somewhere on Ephedia.
52	26	"Crowning Glory, Part II" "L'heure de gloire, 2ème partie"	Robin Stein and Daniel Bryan Franklin	5 January 2017 (Netflix release); 28 February 2017 (France 4)	2.26
Princess Iris and her fellow LoliRock girls return to Ephedia to recover the last oracle gem, but Mephisto and Praxina snatch it from them. Gramorr uses the gem to absorb the crown's powers and free himself. The girls, with Carissa and Lyna, try to fight Gramorr, but are no match for his powers. An enraged Iris summons her greatly advanced Shanila powers to counter Lord Gramorr's blast with her own. In the ensuing struggle, Mephisto pushes Praxina from a collapsing rock, but falls off a cliff and apparently dies from the explosion caused by the collapsing rock. The other five princesses help Princess Iris push back the blast. The crown returns to Princess Iris, as a desperate Lord Gramorr summons one last blast, but is destroyed by the combined blast of the five magical princesses' scepters. Princess Iris reunites with her long-lost parents, the King and Queen of Planet Ephedia, but the reunion is interrupted by Praxina, who is wearing the remaining half of Lord Gramorr's powerful mask of evil, who vows to enact vengeance on Princess Iris by attacking Earth for the death of her twin brother Mephisto. Princess Iris returns to Earth and meets up with Nathaniel, who presents her with a sweetheart ring. She notices a pink glittering butterfly that Praxina has sent to spy on her, which concerns her greatly. Watching nearby, Praxina assures herself that she will make Princess Iris suffer enough to know what it is like to lose someone she cares about.
