= Italian destroyer Francesco Stocco =

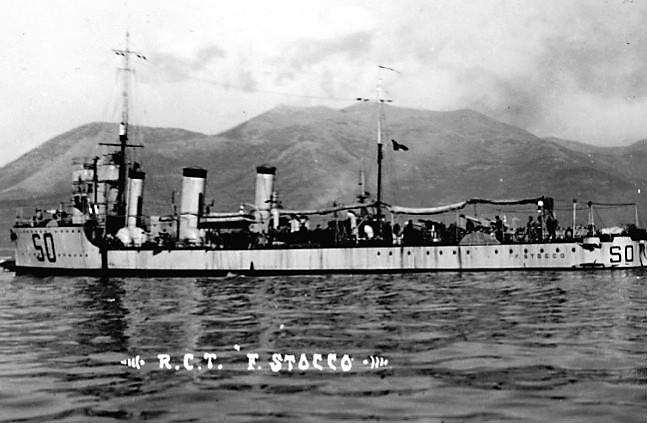
- Francesco Stocco

History

Kingdom of Italy
- Name: Francesco Stocco
- Launched: 5 June 1917
- Fate: Sunk 24 September 1943

General characteristics
- Class & type: Giuseppe Sirtori-class destroyer
- Displacement: 709 t (698 long tons) (normal); 914 t (900 long tons) (deep load)
- Length: 73.54 m (241 ft 3 in) (o/a)
- Beam: 7.34 m (24 ft 1 in)
- Draft: 2.7 m (8 ft 10 in) (mean)
- Installed power: 4 × Thornycroft boilers; 15,500 shp (11,600 kW)
- Propulsion: 2 shafts; 2 steam turbines
- Speed: 30 knots (56 km/h; 35 mph)
- Range: 1,700 nmi (3,100 km; 2,000 mi) at 12 knots (22 km/h; 14 mph)
- Complement: 98 officers and men
- Armament: 6 × single 102 mm (4 in) guns; 2 × single 40 mm (1.6 in) AA guns; 2 × twin 450 mm (17.7 in) torpedo tubes; 10 × mines

Francesco Stocco was the third of four Giuseppe Sirtori-class destroyers built for the Italian Regia Marina (Royal Navy) in the 1910s.

== Design ==
The ships of the Giuseppe Sirtori class were 72.5 m (237 ft 10 in) long at the waterline and 73.54 m (241 ft 3 in) long overall, with a beam of 7.34 m (24 ft 1 in) and a mean draft of 2.7 m (8 ft 10 in). They displaced 709 t (698 long tons) standard and up to 914 t (900 long tons) at full load. They had a crew of 98 officers and enlisted men. The ships were powered by two steam turbines, with steam provided by four Thornycroft water-tube boilers. The engines were rated to produce 15,500 shaft horsepower (11,600 kW) for a top speed of 30 knots (56 km/h; 35 mph), though in service they reached as high as 33.6 knots (62.2 km/h; 38.7 mph) from around 17,000 shp (13,000 kW). At a more economical speed of 15 knots (28 km/h; 17 mph), the ships could cruise for 1,700 nautical miles (3,100 km; 2,000 mi).

Franco Stocco was armed with a main battery of six 102 mm (4 in) guns. Her light armament consisted of a pair of 40 mm (1.6 in) anti-aircraft guns and two 6.5 mm (0.26 in) machine guns. She was also equipped with four 450 mm (17.7 in) torpedo tubes in two twin launchers, one on each side of the ship. The ship also carried ten naval mines.

== Service history ==
Francesco Stocco was built at the Cantieri navali Odero shipyard in Sestri Ponente, and was launched on 5 June 1917.

After the Italian surrender to the Allies on 3 September 1943, German forces launched a major attack against their erstwhile ally. Francesco Stocco was attacked and sunk by German bombers on 24 September while cruising off Corfu.
