= Italian ship Fulmine =

Fulmine was the name of at least three ships of the Italian Navy and may refer to:

- Italian destroyer Fulmine (1898), a destroyer launched in 1898 and discarded in 1921.
- Italian destroyer Fulmine (1931), a Folgore-class destroyer launched in 1931 and sunk in 1941.
- Italian patrol boat Fulmine (P 499), a patrol boat launched in 1955 as Sentinella and renamed in 1965. She was retired in 1970.
